= Imbrucciata =

Corsican dessert

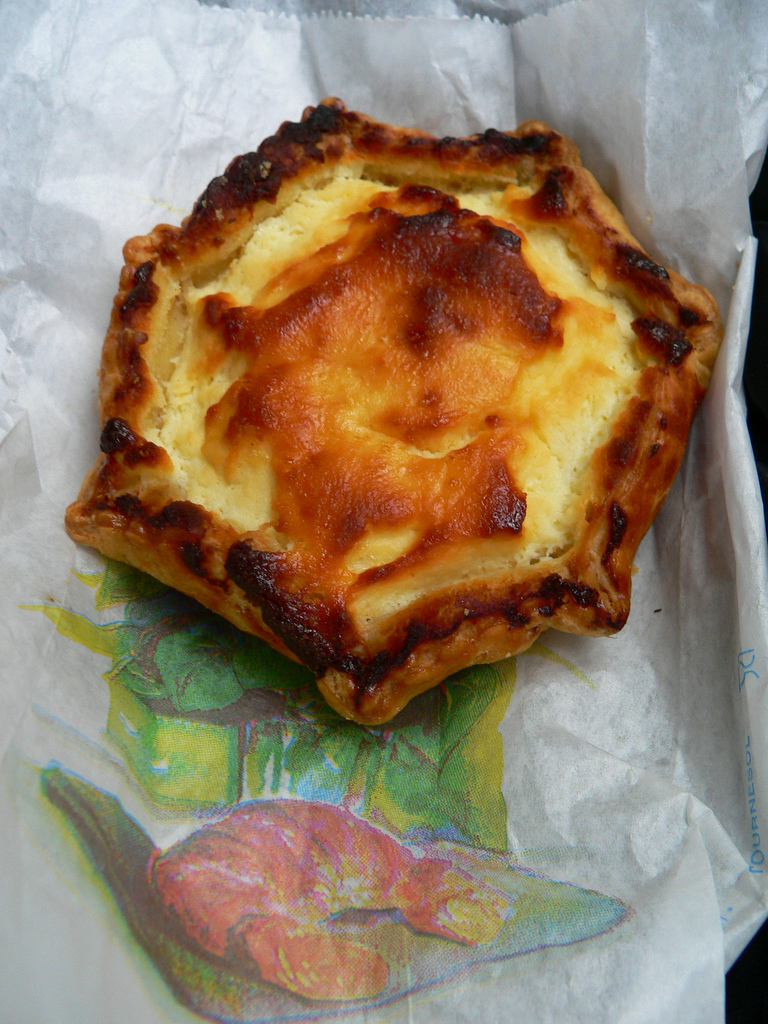
An imbrucciata

Imbrucciata (pl.: imbrucciate) is a typical Corsican dessert, similar to a small fiadone but, unlike this, it has a bottom layer of shortcrust pastry. The ingredients of the filling are brocciu cheese, sugar, eggs and lemon zest.

The cake has a round shape with small bits of pasta around the edge: these result from pinching the dough during the preparation. Its diameter ranges from 8 to 10 cm, and is 2 to 3 cm. thick. After being baked in oven with moderate heat, the cake looks a bit swollen and covered by a very thin, golden crust.

== Bibliography ==
- Schapira, Christiane (1994). La bonne cuisine corse (in French). Paris: Solar. ISBN 2-263-00177-8.
- Delfosse, Claire (1999). "Les pâtisseries locales, objets de patrimoine rural? L'exemple des imbrucciate corses" (PDF) (in French). Ministère de la Culture, SEGESA.
