= Cuisine of Corsica =

Traditional food of Corsica, France

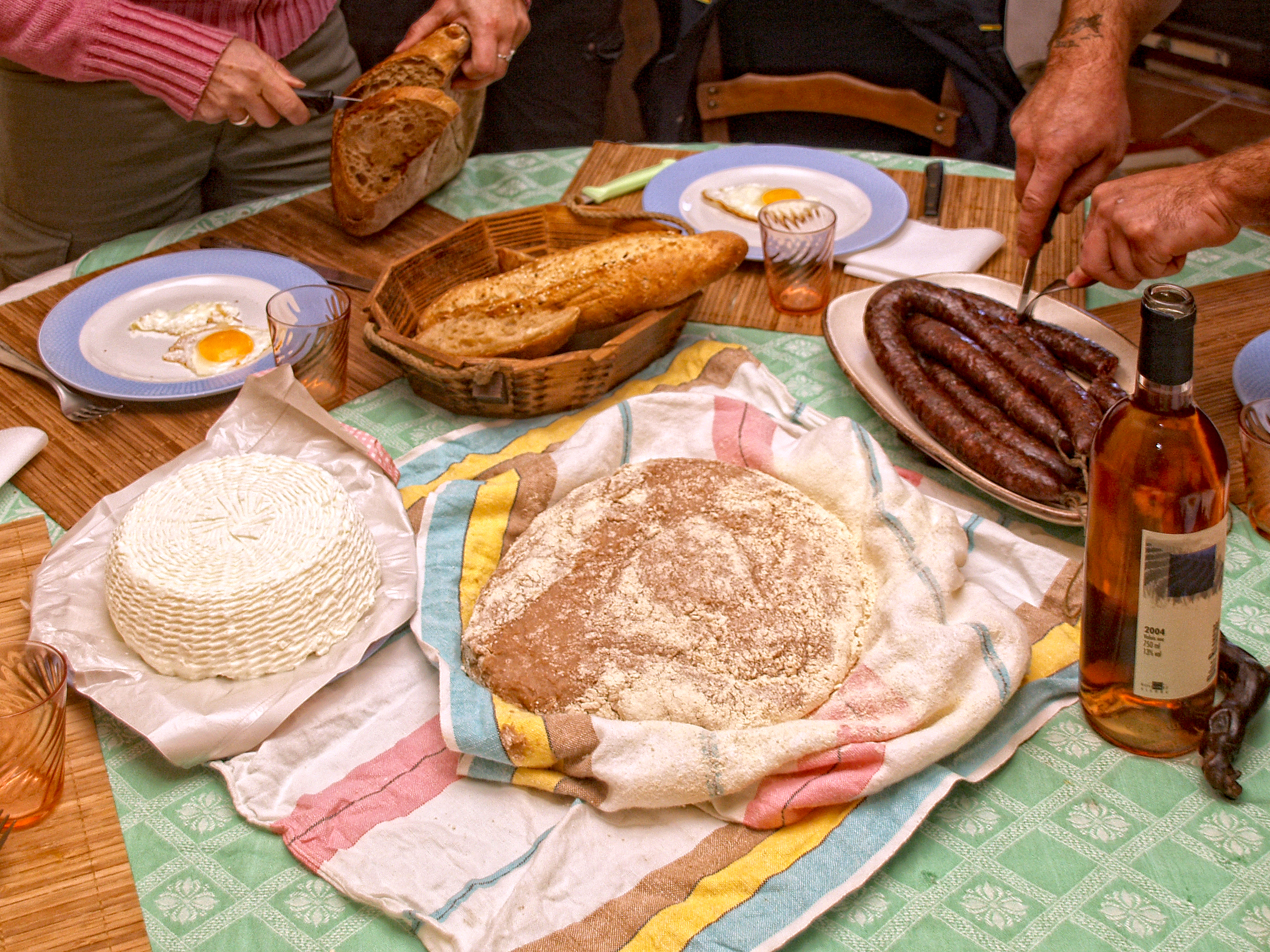
A traditional Corsican meal with (from left to right): brocciu, pulenda and figatellu

The cuisine of Corsica is the traditional cuisine of the island of Corsica. It is mainly based on the products of the island, and due to historical and geographical reasons, has much in common with Italian cuisine, and marginally with those of Nice and Provence.

== History ==
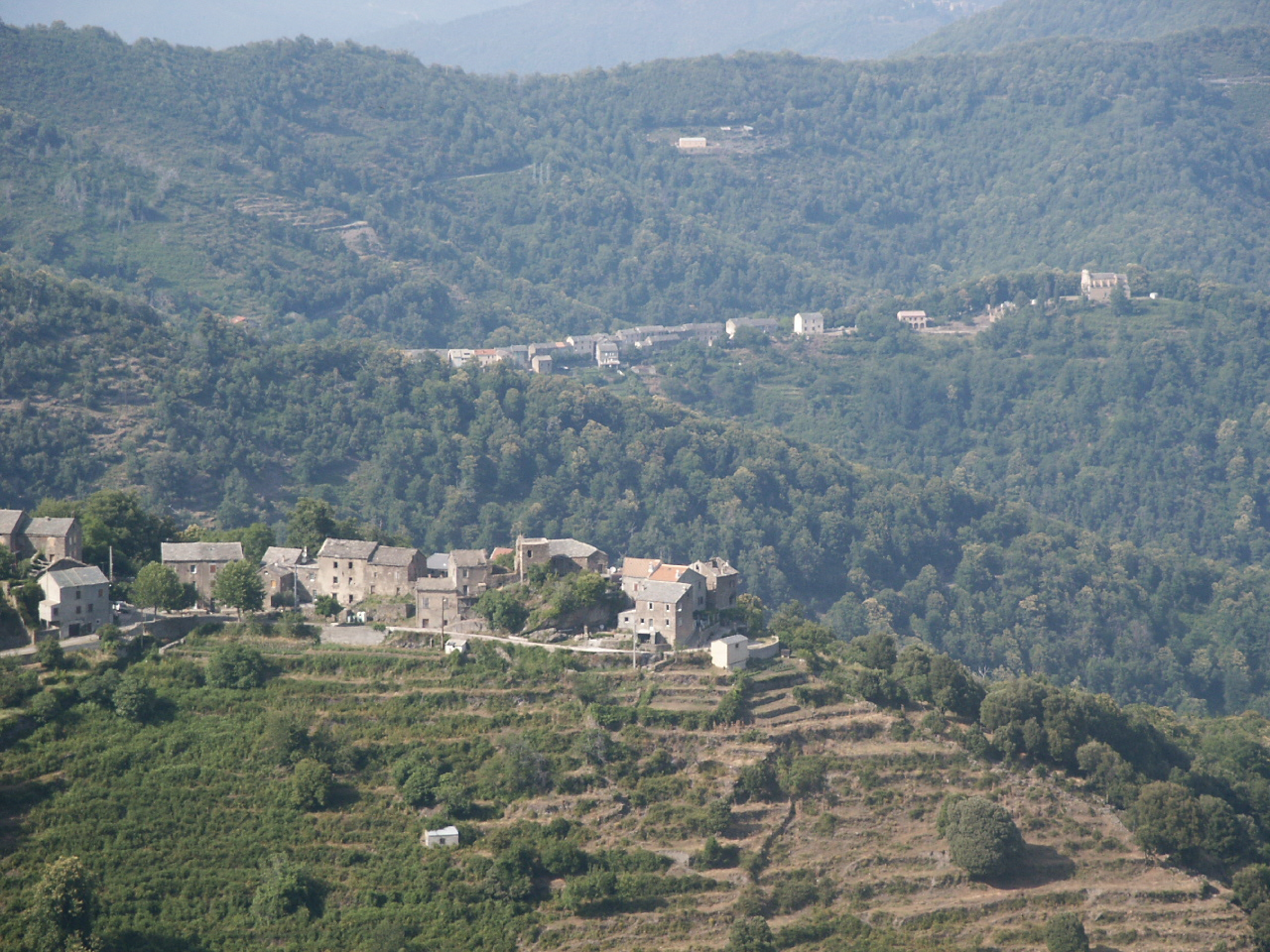
Panorama of Castagniccia: The Genoese rule drastically changed the landscape of large parts of the island, introducing chestnut trees widely.

The geographic conformation of Corsica, with its eastern coast (the one nearest to the continent) low, malaria-ridden, and impossible to defend, forced the population to settle in the mountains of the interior. The agricultural products exported during antiquity reflect this situation: these were sheep, plus honey, wax and tar, produced by the widespread forests. The island was famous for its cheap wines, exported to Rome.

The concentration of settlement in the interior, typical also of the nearby Sardinia, lasted until the beginning of the 20th century; in 1911, 73,000 people lived in the zone comprised between 700 and 1,000 m above sea level.

In the Middle Ages, more precisely during the 12th century, when Pisa was Corsica's hegemonic power, the large-scale immigration from nearby Tuscany brought to the island, together with the Tuscan language, customs and dishes typical of that Italian region. Later, when it was the turn of Genoa to dominate the island, a major shift in people's eating habits took place; the Genoese governor, with a decree signed on 28 August 1548, ordered that each landowner and tenant had to plant at least one chestnut, a mulberry, an olive, and a fig tree each year, under the fine of three lire for each tree not planted. The reason for this decree was to give means of subsistence to island populations. Still, at the beginning of the 17th century, the Genoese administrator Baliano wrote that the Corsicans were living on barley bread, vegetables, and pure water.

Other decrees were given on the same line, such as that issued in 1619, which ordered that 10 chestnut trees had to be planted every year by each landowner and tenant, with time changed radically the landscape of whole regions of the island, with the almost total substitution of cereals with chestnuts; one region, the Castagniccia, south of Bastia, got its name from its chestnut (castagnu) forests.

In the 18th century, the chestnut had almost completely replaced cereals. Above all, chestnut plantations radically changed the diet of the islanders, preserving them from the recurrent famines. It was so common that the historian of Corsica Jakob Von Wittelieb wrote that in the 1730s travelers in the island brought with them a flask filled with wine and a pocket containing a chestnut bread or some roasted chestnuts.

An old Corsican proverb from upper Niolo asserts: Pane di legnu e vinu di petra (English: Wooden bread and stoney wine), referencing both the central place occupied by the chestnut in Corsica's alimentation and the frugality of Corsican mountaineers, obliged to drink water instead of wine.

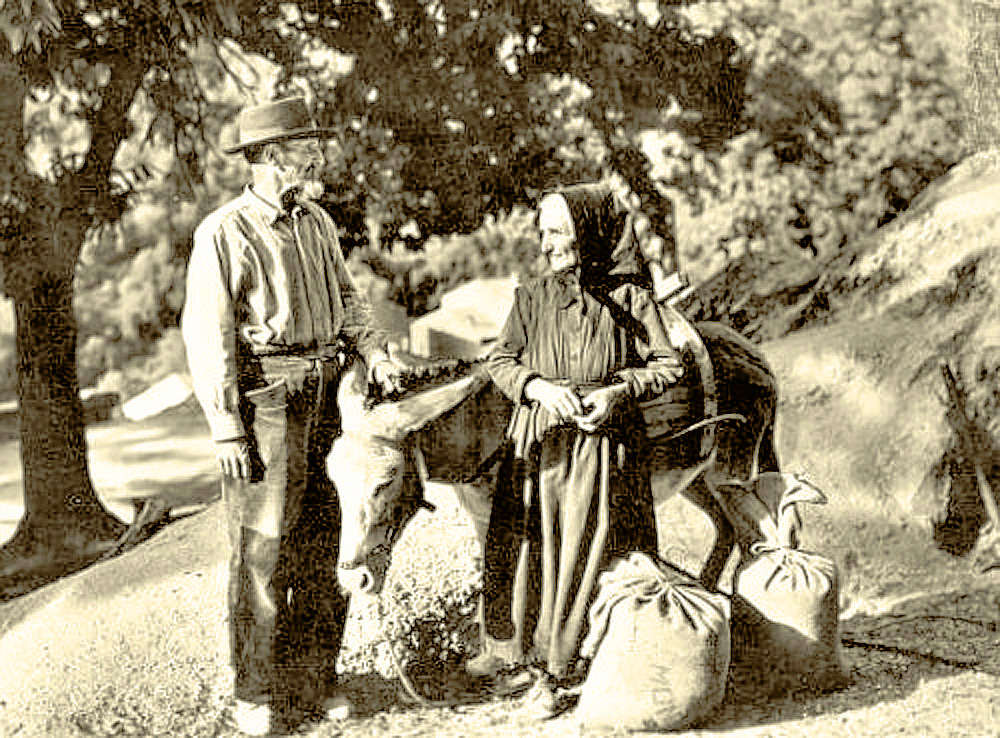
Chestnut picking in Castagniccia (end of 19th century)

During the Corsican independence before the French annexation, Pasquale Paoli tried to enrich the diet of his countrymen encouraging the cultivation of the potato, so his political opponents ridiculed him, calling him Il Generale delle patate.

The French annexation in 1768 brought at first a change in this situation; in an effort to subjugate rebellion, the French army proceeded to cut down many chestnut forests, and this policy continued also during the first years of peace, since Paris favoured cereals over chestnut as staple food. After a while, though, the cutting down of chestnut trees ended, so that until the beginning of 20th century, chestnut in the form of pancakes, bread, or porridge remained the staple food of the larger part of Corsican population. In addition to chestnuts, at the end of the 18th century, the staples of the Corsican diet were cereals (mainly wheat and rye), dried vegetables, and charcuterie.

There were also exceptions: from a testimony of 1775, during that year the owners of Cap Corse vineyards used the revenue from the sale of their wine to buy Italian pasta, goat meat and pork, and cod, and with those foodstuffs they ate all year round. The poor of the same region instead worked in the vineyards in the spring till the harvest, but in winter, they fed on wild herb soups. A few during summer went to reap the corn in the malaria plain of Aleria, but often after that they lost their health or life.

For the most part, at the end of the 18th century eating was therefore eminently plant-based: the mayor of Stazzona, in Castagniccia, answering a questionnaire on the way of life drawn by the French authorities ("the questionnaire of the year X") mentions as basis of the diet of the village chestnut, of which he lists 12 different ways to treat it. He also writes that from November to June, only chestnut bread was consumed, and that the villagers owned vegetable gardens devoted exclusively to their feeding. The monotony of this diet was broken eating trout and eels.

After the beginning of the 20th century, the autarchic village economy based mainly upon chestnut and other locally produced aliments as pork faded away for several reasons; above all, the eradication of malaria after the Second World War allowed life along the east coast and accelerated the depopulation of the interior.

In 1990, only 20,000 people lived still in the zone between 700 and 1000 m above sea level. These changes brought also an abandonment of the production of traditional food; while in 1796, 35,442 hectares were occupied by chestnuts woods, in 1977, chestnut forests still covered 25,000 hectares, but only 3,067 hectares were cultivated; the rest were left to the animals.

This situation could be only partially reverted due to the demand of local food coming from the many tourists visiting the island and to the establishment of higher quality standards in food production, also due to the AOC and AOP origin designations.

== Typical products ==
=== Chestnut ===
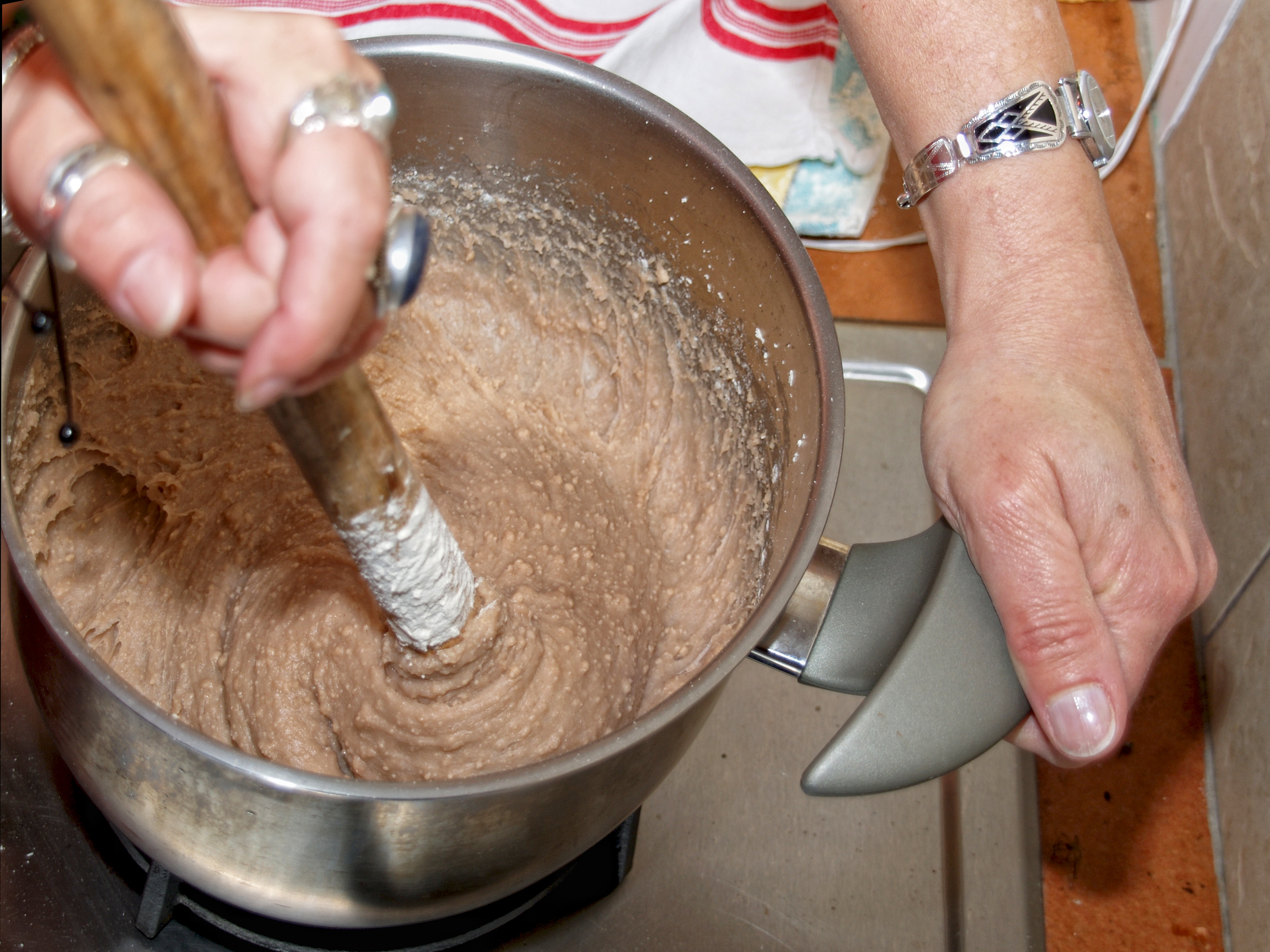
Chestnut flour is the main ingredient of pulenta

Large-scale cultivation of the chestnut tree was introduced in Corsica during the Genoese domination. Rich in calories, the fruits were plucked (without gloves) and dried, and placed on a wooden grating (Corsican: a grata) above a fire (Corsican: u fucone) for one month: this fire, placed on a dry clay base 1 m^{2} in area and 20 cm thick, smokes also the charcuterie and heats the house. After that, they were ground to produce chestnut flour, which gets an unmistakable smoke flavour from this process. The unplucked chestnuts are eaten by the pigs foraging in the forest. They are additionally fed with chestnut flour, so that their meat acquires a characteristic taste. Used to prepare polenta (Corsican: pulenta, pulenda) and cakes, this flour was the basic staple food. The importance of chestnut in Corsican life can be seen from the fact that during a traditional wedding lunch taking place in 19th century Castagniccia, not less than 22 different courses were prepared using chestnuts as the main ingredient. Today chestnut flour is a French AOC and a European AOP, under the name Farine de châtaigne corse-Farina castagnina corsa.

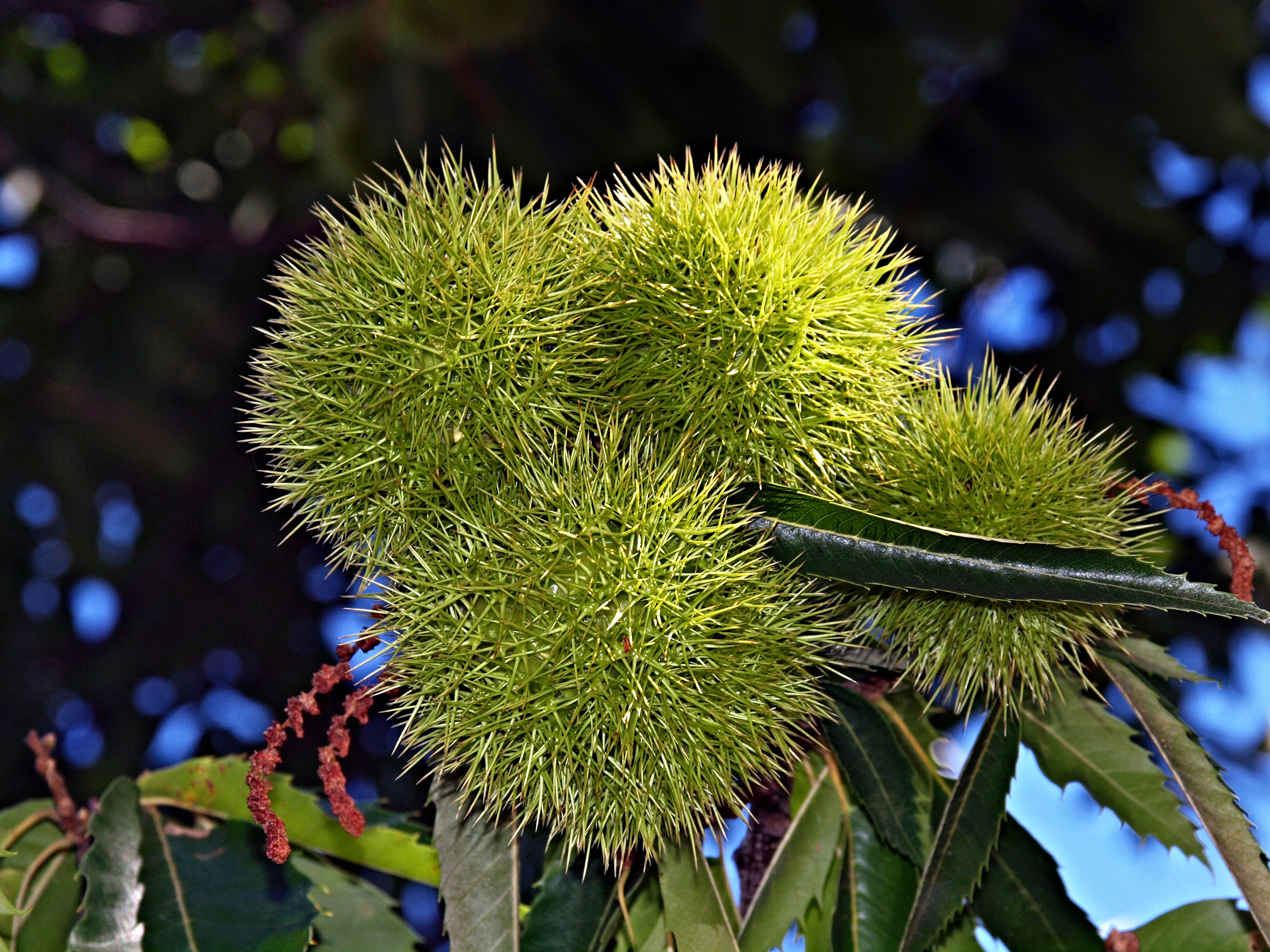
Corsican chestnuts from Evisa

At the end of 20th century, 85% (1,200 tonnes) of the chestnuts plucked in Corsica were ground into flour, uniquely among all the French departments. The 300 t of flour so obtained were consumed almost totally in Corsica, a small part was exported to mainland France and bought by Corsicans of the diaspora.

Chestnut and its products are the centrepiece of two yearly fairs in Corsica: A Fiera di a Castagna in Bocognano, which takes place at the beginning of December and the Fête du Marron occurring at Évisa at the end of November.

=== Cheese ===
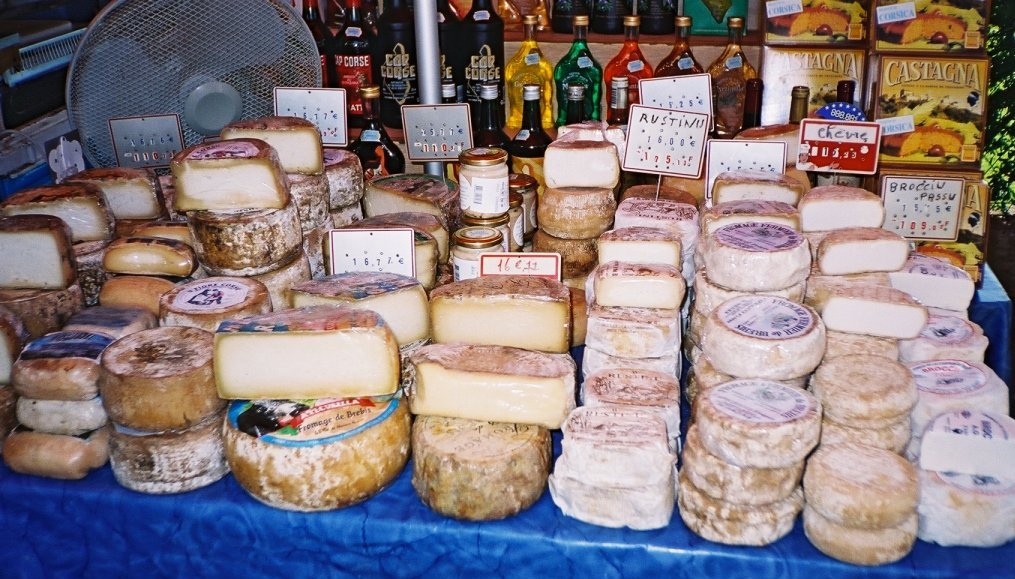
Corsican cheeses on display

Corsican traditional cheeses are exclusively made with sheep or goat milk. In the mid-1980s, the island raised 150,000 sheep and 20,000 goats. The most important among them is Brocciu, a whey cheese akin to ricotta (but without lactose), produced for the most part with sheep milk, sometimes with goat milk. It can be consumed either fresh or aged, and is an ingredient of innumerable Corsican dishes, from first courses up to cakes. Brocciu is the only Corsican cheese to have received the AOC denomination so far. Other notable cheeses are the niulincu (from Niolo, the heart of Corsica), the balaninu (from Balagne, the north-west region), the bastilicacciu and sartinesu (respectively from Bastelica and Sartène, in southern Corsica), and the cuscionu of the Zicavo valley, also in the south. The casgiu merzu ("rotten cheese") is a cheese containing insect larvae similar to the Sardinian casu marzu. Corsican cheese producers meet each year in early May at the cheese fair (A Fiera di U Casgiu) in Venaco.

=== Charcuterie ===
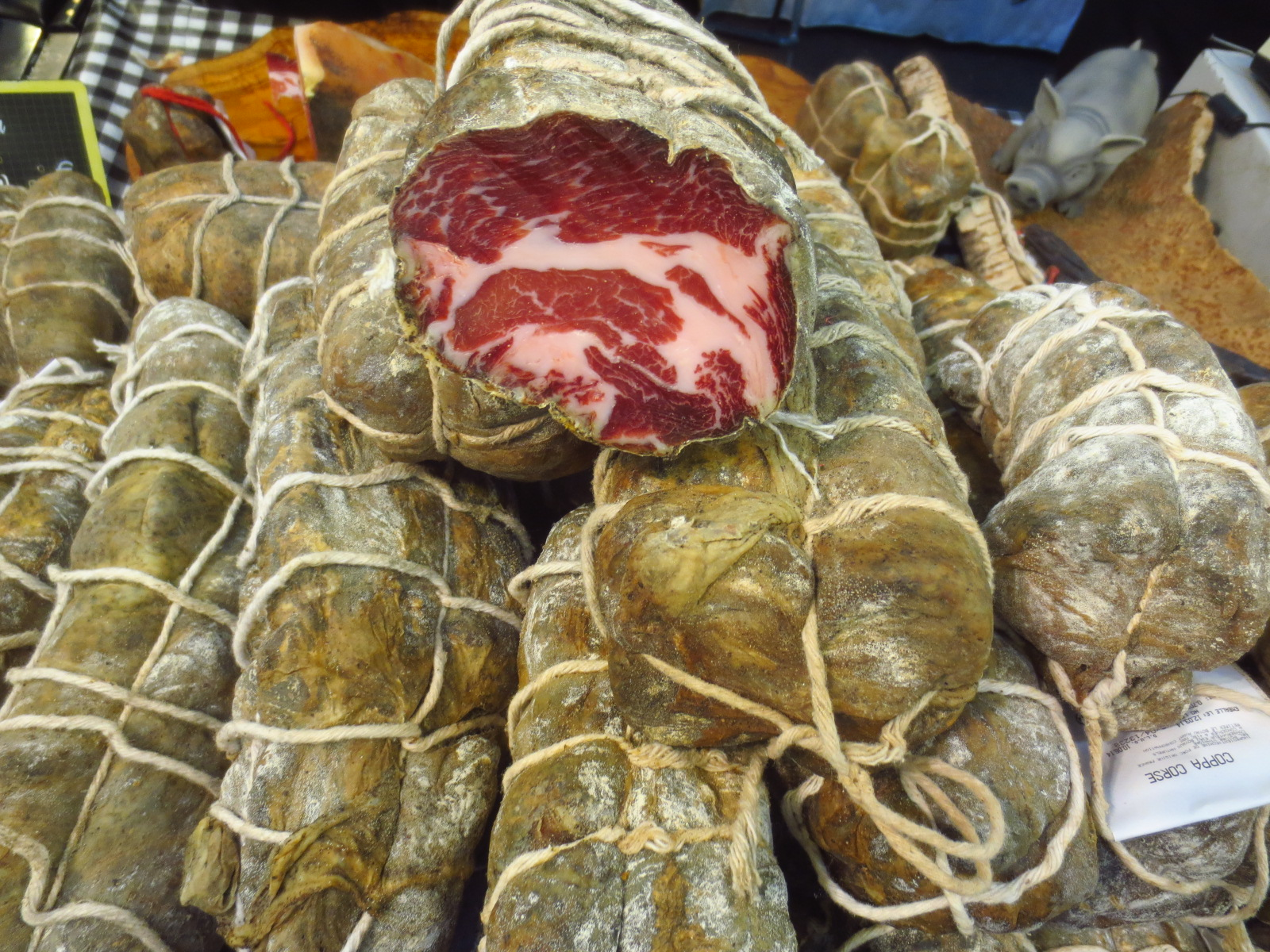
Coppa from Corsica

Corsican charcuterie is considered one of the best worldwide due to the traditional production processes, and to the fact that Corsican pigs (porcu nustrale), which live partly in the wild, are crossbred with wild boar (Cingale, Singhjari) and are mainly fed with chestnuts and chestnut flour. Each peasant family has one or two pigs; these are castrated (sterilised if female) when they are two months old. When they are slaughtered, they are about 14 months old and weigh 200 kg. This usually happens in December, before Christmas. The carcass is hung upside-down to let the blood drain, and is totally processed. The same day as the slaughtering, dishes are prepared such as figatelli, boudin, and ventra (similar to the Italian sanguinaccio). The intensive breeding takes place in the mountains, where the animals cannot disturb the cultures. Above all in the Castagniccia, Bastelica, upper Taravo, and Quenza regions, a pigherd (u purcaghju) watches the pigs, which are free to search in the woods for chestnuts, roots, and small animals, but in the evening, they are fed with kitchen scraps and spoilt apples. Typical cold cuts are prisuttu (ham); panzetta (bacon); lonzu, one of the four pork's fillets, peppered, salted and smoked; figatellu (a sausage made with pork liver), and capicollu (also called coppa). Figatellu is smoked above the fucone three or four days, then put to dry: it can be consumed roasted or grilled. Prisuttu, coppa and lonzu acquired in 2012 the AOC denomination.

Following the tradition of mainland France, in Corsica are prepared several pâtés (pastizzi) from pork liver (pastizzu di fecatu di maiale), thrush (pastizzu di torduli), hare (pastizzu di levru), common blackbird (pastizzu di meruli, now prohibited), wild boar (pastizzu di singhjari).

=== Olive oil ===
Corsican olive oil is mainly produced in the hills of Balagne, the northwest region of the island, where a quarter of all olive trees on the island exist. Another important region for oil is the Alta Rocca, around Bonifacio: here in the village of Santa Lucia di Tallano, each year is celebrated the Festa di l'olio novu, a yearly fair devoted to the production of the new oil. As a whole, the olive groves cover in Corsica 2,000 hectares, divided among 300 producers. The olives, which are mostly black, are not plucked manually; they fall on nets lying under old trees, while those on young trees are plucked mechanically. The harvest occurs when they are ripe, between November and May. Since 2004, the Corsican oil is an AOC product, under the name Huile d'Olive de Corse-Oliu di Corsica, and successively it got also the AOP European denomination.

Olive trees in Corsica are under threat from Xylella fastidiosa, a disease spread by tiny sap-sucking insects known as leafhoppers, which in April 2018 was reported to have spread from Italy.

=== Wine ===
Wine was introduced into Corsica by the Greeks. The Romans developed the wine industry, and imported Corsican wines. The island's wines were highly regarded during the Renaissance: in the Gallery of Maps in the Vatican, which depicts the regions of Italy and its surrounding islands, the 16th century Italian cosmographer Ignazio Danti wrote above the map of Corsica: "Corsica has received four major gifts from Nature: its horses, its dogs, its proud and courageous men and its wines, most generous, that princes hold in the highest esteem!" In 1887 the vineyards of the island were hit by the Phylloxera. A dramatic change in the island's viticulture happened at the beginning of the 1960s. At that time about 20,000 pied-noirs (French colonists from Algeria) had to leave north Africa and resettled in Corsica. The French state helped them with huge capitals, that were used among others to plant large vineyards on the east coast (which had been cleared from malaria few years before), introducing southern varieties which changed the profile of Corsican wines. The vineyard area, that amounted to 4,700 hectares in 1959, rose to 28,000 hectares in 1978. wine production rose accordingly from 284,000 hectoliters in 1966 to 2 million hectoliters in 1978. This expansion had as result a massive overproduction, which was fought by the state by uprooting a great part of the vines. This measure brought the surface in 1993 back to 7,609 hectares, 1,994 being of AOC wine, and the production to 410,581 hectoliters, 76,512 being of AOC wine.

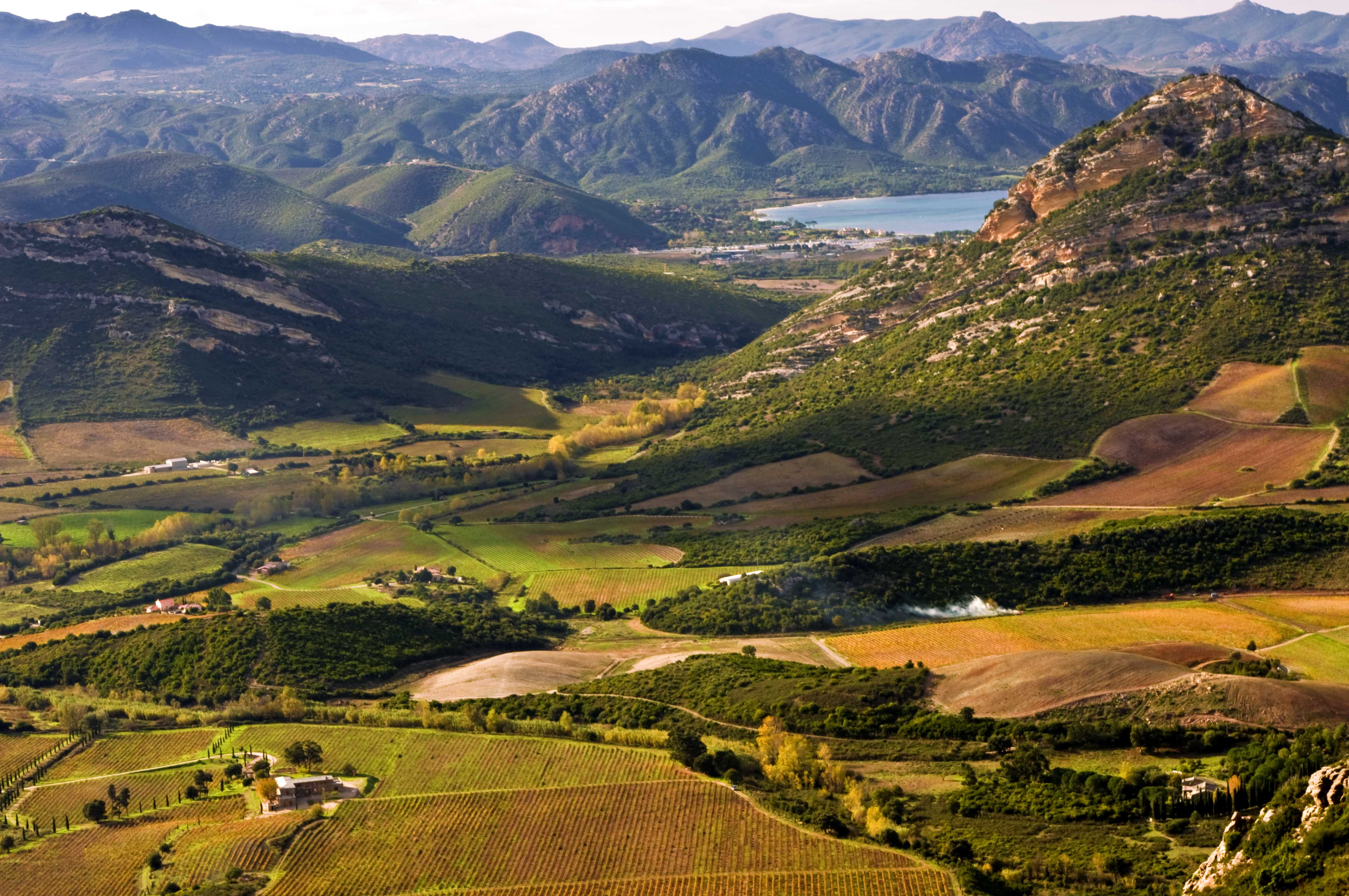
Vineyards near Patrimonio

In 1972, the French Ministry of Agriculture established the denomination "Vin de Corse", the AOC denomination for Corsican wines. Moreover, each production area can have an additional local AOC denomination. These are as of 2014 eight: Porto Vecchio, Figari, Sartène, Ajaccio, Calvi, Patrimonio, Cap Corse (the latter with the Muscat du Cap Corse, a sweet dessert wine). AOC wines must obey to several prescriptions: sugar cannot be added; at least 50% of the grapes must come from traditional Corsican grapes; the yield cannot be higher than 50 hectoliters each hectare; the grapes must be planted only along slopes or dry plateaus. The most important wine regions in the island are: the territory around Patrimonio, at the south west of the Cap Corse peninsula; the Ajaccio region; the Sartène region; the Balagne, and the Cap Corse. Besides the AOC, local wines are also produced in Corsica, under the denomination "Vin du pays".

=== Beer ===
A Corsican specialty is the chestnut beer (biera accumudata cu a castagna), brewed since 1996 by the Pietra Brewery. Pietra beer is a 6% Alcohol by volume amber beer, brewed from a mix of malt and chestnut flour. The annual production in 2006 amounted to over 25,000 hectolitres, exported also to mainland France.

=== Liqueurs ===
The most important Corsican liqueurs are aquavita, a local grappa, and Myrtle (licor di mortula), a liqueur which is also produced in Sardinia, and is obtained, both at home or industrially, through the maceration in alcohol of the berries (and sometimes the leaves) of myrtle, a flowering plant belonging to maquis (machja) and common in both islands. A famous apéritif is the Cap Corse Mattei. Very popular are also Ratafia, liqueurs obtained macerating fruits into local aquavita and sugar.

== Dishes ==
=== Soups ===
Soups (minestre) are an important part of the Corsican cuisine. The minestra, or zuppa corsa, akin to the Italian minestrone, is a soup with beans, potatoes, garlic, onion, mangelwurzel, cabbage and tomatoes, whose grease is given by a ham bone and shortening. Among other traditional soups are the bread soup (minestra di pane cotto), similar to the Italian pancotto; the soup with fresh brocciu (minestra di casgiu frescu, from Carpineto); with aged brocciu (minestra di brocciu seccu); with red beans and leek (minestra di fasgiolu e di porri, from Niolo). On Maundy Thursday, meat is replaced with chickpeas by the minestra incu i ceci di Iovi Santu. In the island is also prepared the Stufatu, a soup whose main ingredient is either wheat flour (stufatu di farin'di granu) or corn flour (stufatu di farin'di granonu). Brilluli is a porridge whose ingredients are chestnut flour, water and goat milk.

=== Pasta, gnocchi and polenta ===
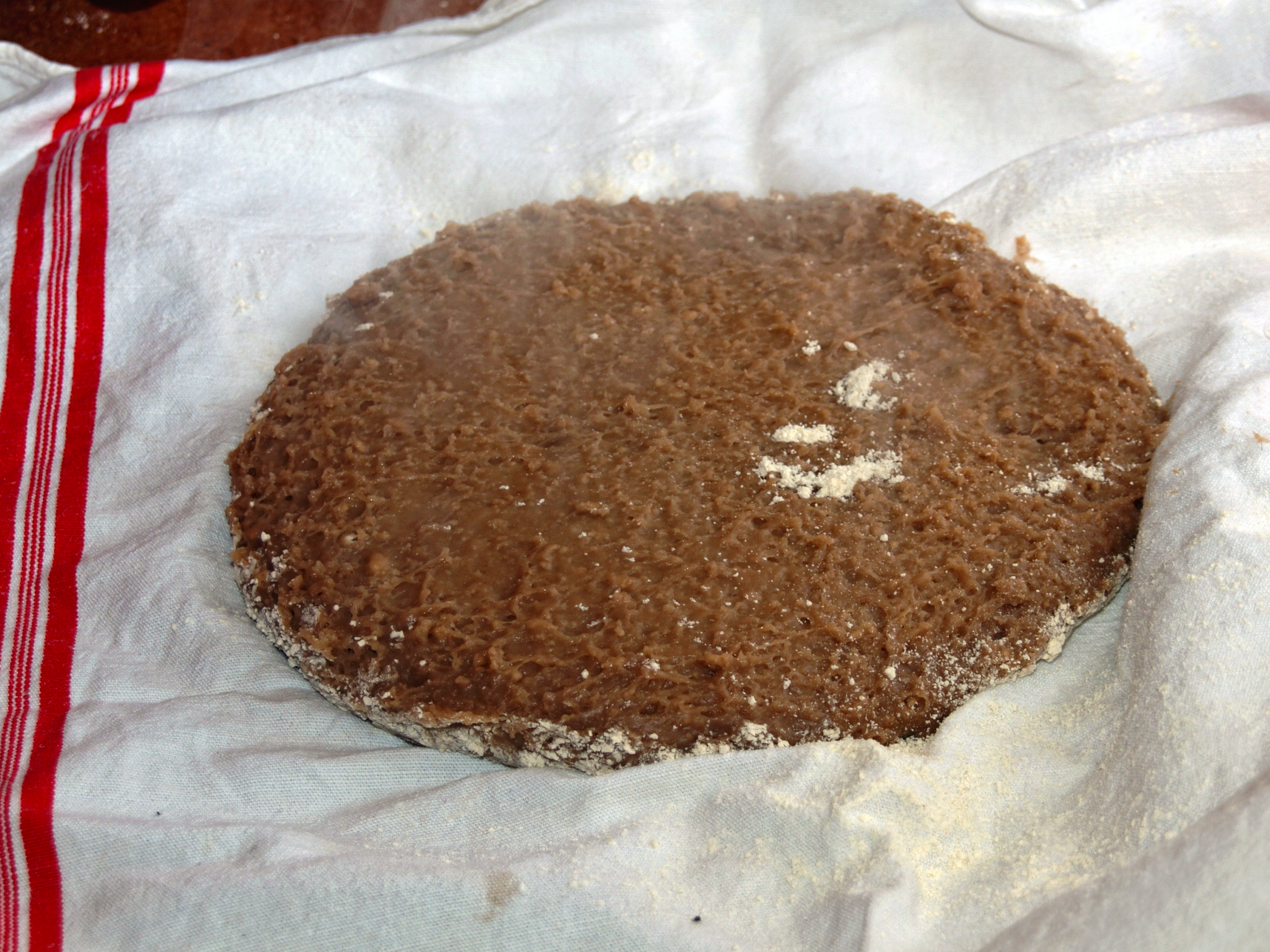
Pulenta castagnina

Pasta dishes particularly show the Italian influence on the Corsican cuisine. Especially stuffed pasta is popular, like ravioli and cannelloni: both are stuffed with brocciu, similar to the Italian ricotta, ravioli together with spinach. Pasta sauce with tomatoes and minced meat (Salsa pe a pastasciutta) is also typical. Other preparations reflect the Italian tradition too: sturzaprezi (literally "priest chokers") are large gnocchi baked in an oven made with brocciu and spinach, akin to the Italian dumpling version of this dish; Panizzi are fritters prepared with gram flour similar to the Sicilian panelle. Lasagne and gnocchi with meat sauce (lasagne incu a salsa and Gnocchi manera bastiaccia, "Gnocchi at the mode of Bastia"), are also popular. Although corn polenta is known, in Corsica Pulenta for antonomasia is that prepared with chestnut flour, pulenta castagnina. Another dish whose main ingredient is chestnut flour is Maccaredda, fritters fried together with panzetta (bacon). Razighe, from Rusio, are thin dough pancakes made of wheat flour, yeast, egg and cracklings (a byproduct of sdruttu processing). Migliacci are savory galettes made of wheat flour, yeast, whey, goat and sheep cheese, baked on chestnut leaves.

=== Meat ===
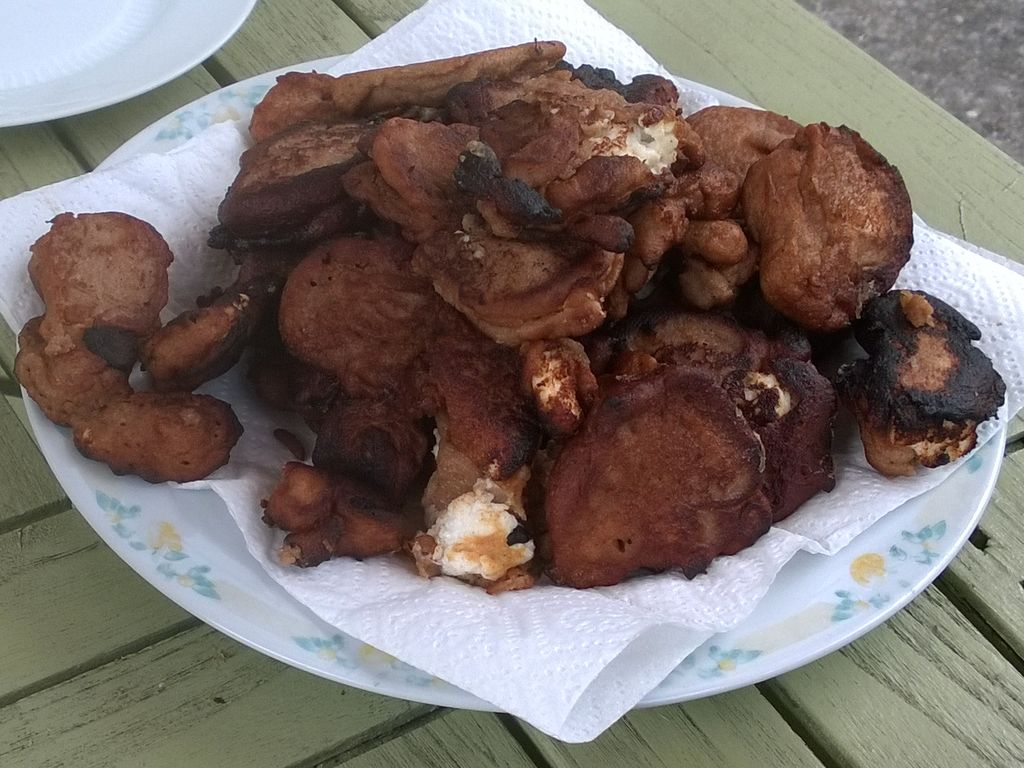
Fritelli castagnini, chestnut flour fritters

Meat in Corsica often comes from locally bred animals, and gets its flavour from the numerous herbs of the maquis (machja) which feed them. Very popular is lamb (agnellu) and kid (caprettu), the latter consumed especially at Easter. They can be eaten roasted, as ragout (tianu) or stew (in cazzarola) Stufatu is a stew made with beef meat, ham, garlic, onion, clove and herbs. Game is also abundant: wild boar (singhjari), thrush (tordulu), hare (levru), common blackbird (merulu, now protected), snipes (bicazzi) have their own recipes. Several dishes are prepared when the pig is slaughtered: Sanghi di maiale incu l'uva secca, a blood sausage with raisin, akin to the Italian Sanguinaccio and the French boudin; Ventra, another preparation made with pork blood, pork stomach and mangold; Casgiu di Porcu ("Pork cheese"), resulting from boiling several hours pork head and feet, cooking the detached meat and fat with spices and letting it harden in a receptacle; Misgiscia, similar to Albanian and Tibetan dishes, is a filet of goat, cut in thin slices which are macerated in vinegar, spiced with herbs, and skewered on a green tree branch. Dried to the sun, they are consumed grilled or cooked as ragout. Another typical preparation during pork slaughtering is clarified pork fat (u sdruttu) used as fat instead of olive oil. Porto Vecchio is home to three dishes prepared with innards: Corda, goat or sheep intestines boiled in water and cooked in a pan with onion and garlic; Rivia, lamb or kid intestine, innards, cooked on a skewer, put into the animal's caul, and pickled, similar to the Sardinian Cordula; Manghjaria, ram, sheep or goat tripe, in the past offered to the people participating to a funeral.

=== Fish ===
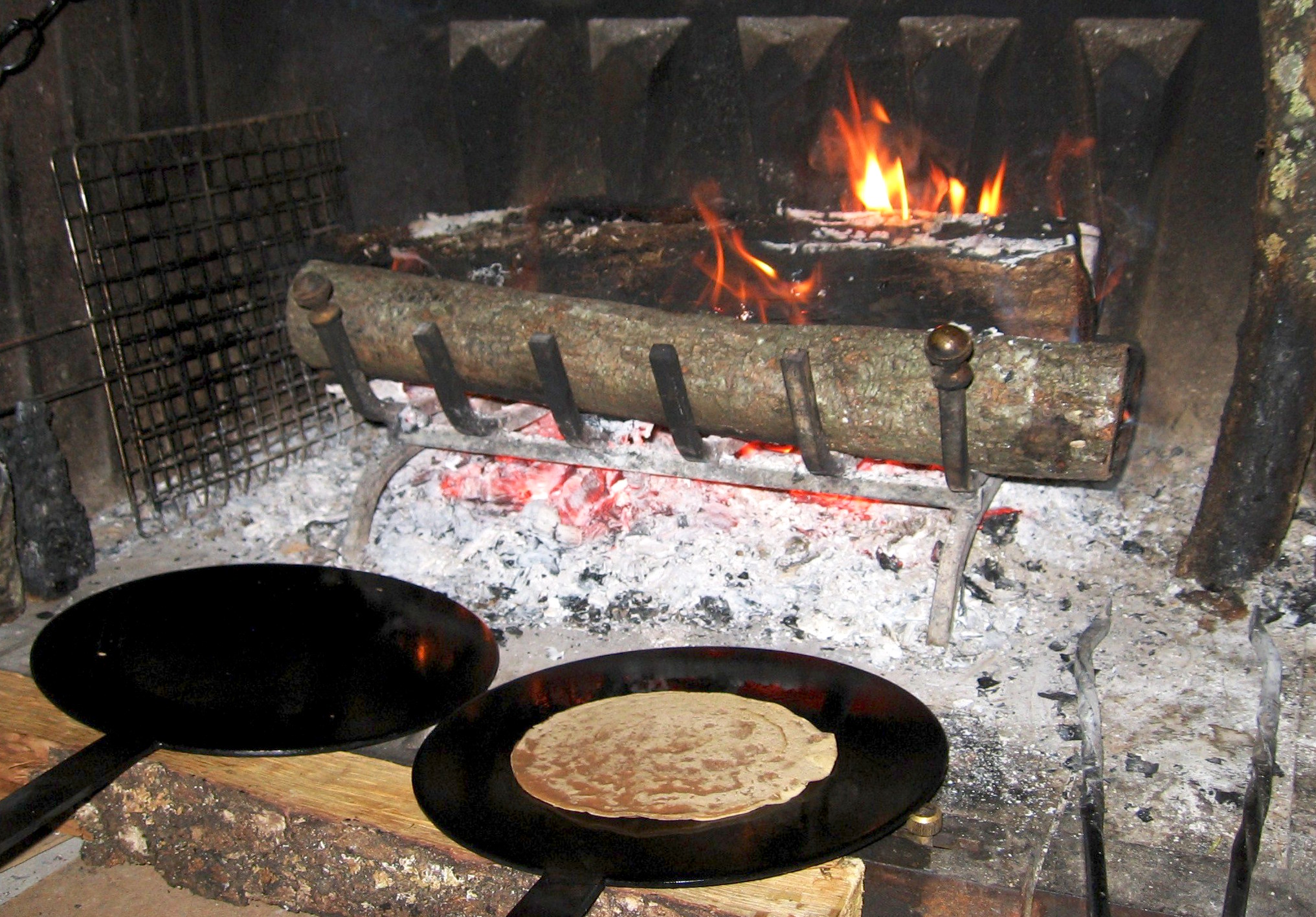
A chestnut flour nicciu, just cooked between two iron plates (i ferri)

In the sea around Corsica are fished about forty species of fish. Fish are also abundant in the inland rivers and creeks. Typical is the fish soup, either with sea fish (azziminu di Capicorsu) or with river fish (azziminu di Corte). A legacy of the Genoese (and of the centuries-old contacts with Tuscany and Rome) are the dishes based on baccala and on stockfish: the former can be deep fried (fritelle di baccalà), or–a recipe from the Genoese colony of Bonifacio–with mangold and raisin (baccalà incu e cee e l'uva secca), while the latter is prepared with tomatoes, anchovies and walnuts, in a dish named u pestu. The national cheese, brocciu, is used also with fish, in dishes as sardines stuffed with brocciu (sardine piene incu u brocciu) or anchovy-brocciu cake (torta d'anchjuve e di brocciu). The large lagoons along the east coast (like the Étang de Biguglia and de Diana) produce eels, which are cooked roasted (anguilla arustita) or as stew (tianu d'anguila). The creeks of the mountains gives trouts in abundance: these are consumed stuffed with brocciu (truite piene incu u brocciu), or simply roasted over a hot creek stone (truite annant'a petre fiuminalinche).

=== Vegetables ===
Corsican cuisine, akin to other Mediterranean cuisines, shows several stuffed vegetables (ripieni), the stuffing ingredient being always brocciu: artichokes (l'artichjocchi pieni) and zucchini (e zucchine piene incu u brocciu), aubergines (from Porto Vecchio and Sartène) (i mirizani pieni), onions (e civolle piene incu u brocciu). Vegetarian ragouts are also popular, like that with fava beans (u tianu di fave fresche) or with red beans and leeks (u tianu di fasgioli e porri). Sciacci are short pastry fritters filled with potatoes (sciacci di pommi) and grated cheese.

=== Desserts ===
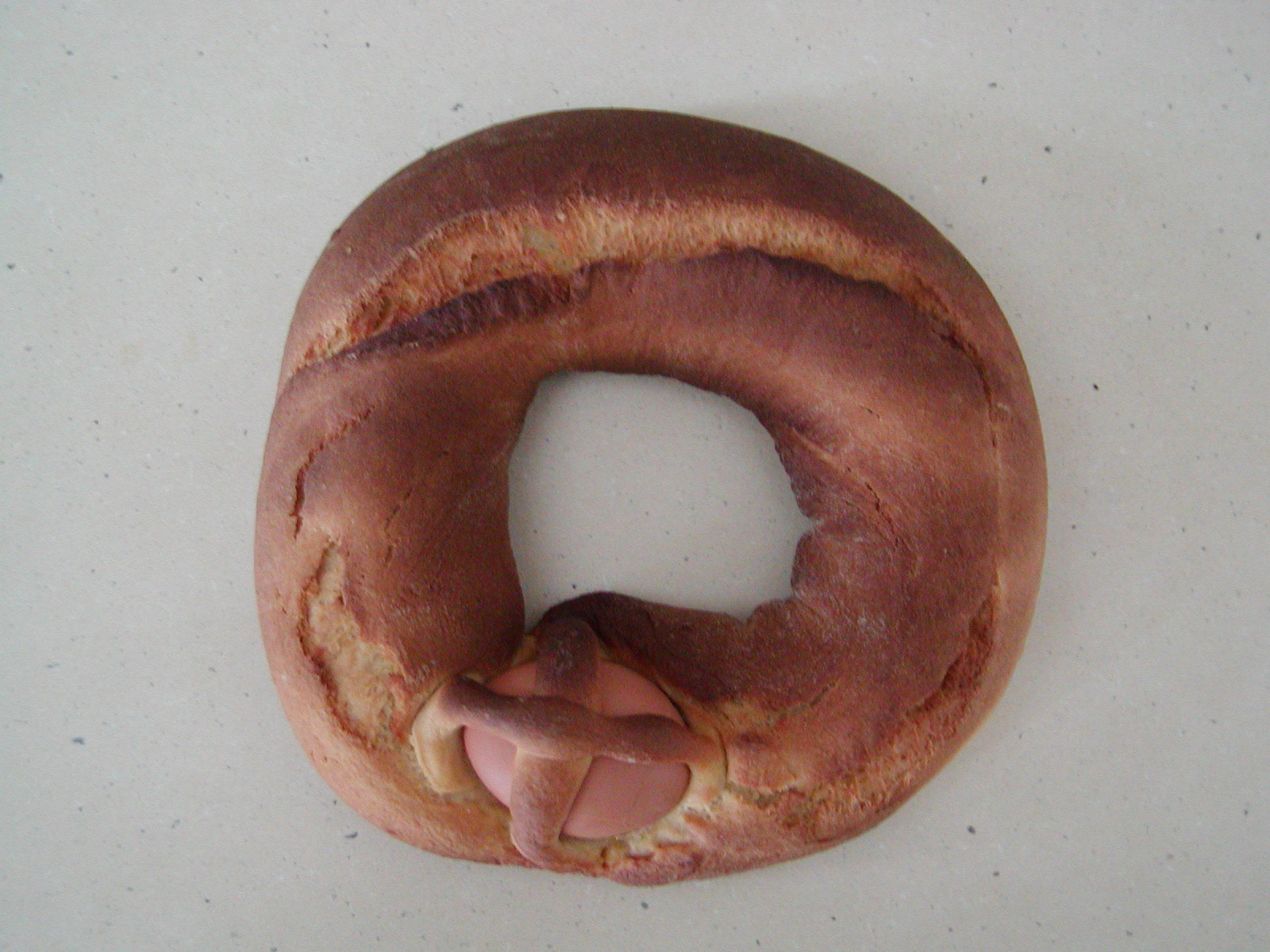
Caccaveddu from Sartène

Chestnut flour and brocciu appear as ingredients by many Corsican cakes. Falculelle from Corte are small cakes made with brocciu, sugar, flour and egg yolk, and cooked in oven over a chestnut leaf. Cacavellu, from Vico, is a round cake prepared with a wheat, yeast, eggs and sdruttu dough, garnished with brocciu mixed with sugar, orange zest and eggs. Fiadone, prepared also in a similar form in some regions of southern Italy, is a cheesecake made with brocciu, eggs, sugar and citron zest. Imbrucciate are little fiadoni which have puff pastry as bottom layer. Canistrelli, akin to the Italian Canestrelli, are biscuits made with flour, butter, sugar, and flavoured with white wine or anisette, while cucciole, originating from Balagne, are biscuits made of flour, oil, sugar and white wine. Castagnacciu, a simple Italian cake consisting only of chestnut flour, raisins and walnuts, is prepared also in Corsica. Also with chestnut flour are prepared nicci, galettes cooked in the fireplace between two iron plates (i ferri), very popular also in central Italy. Frappe are fried dough rhombs flavored with lemon zest, similar to the Italian castagnole.

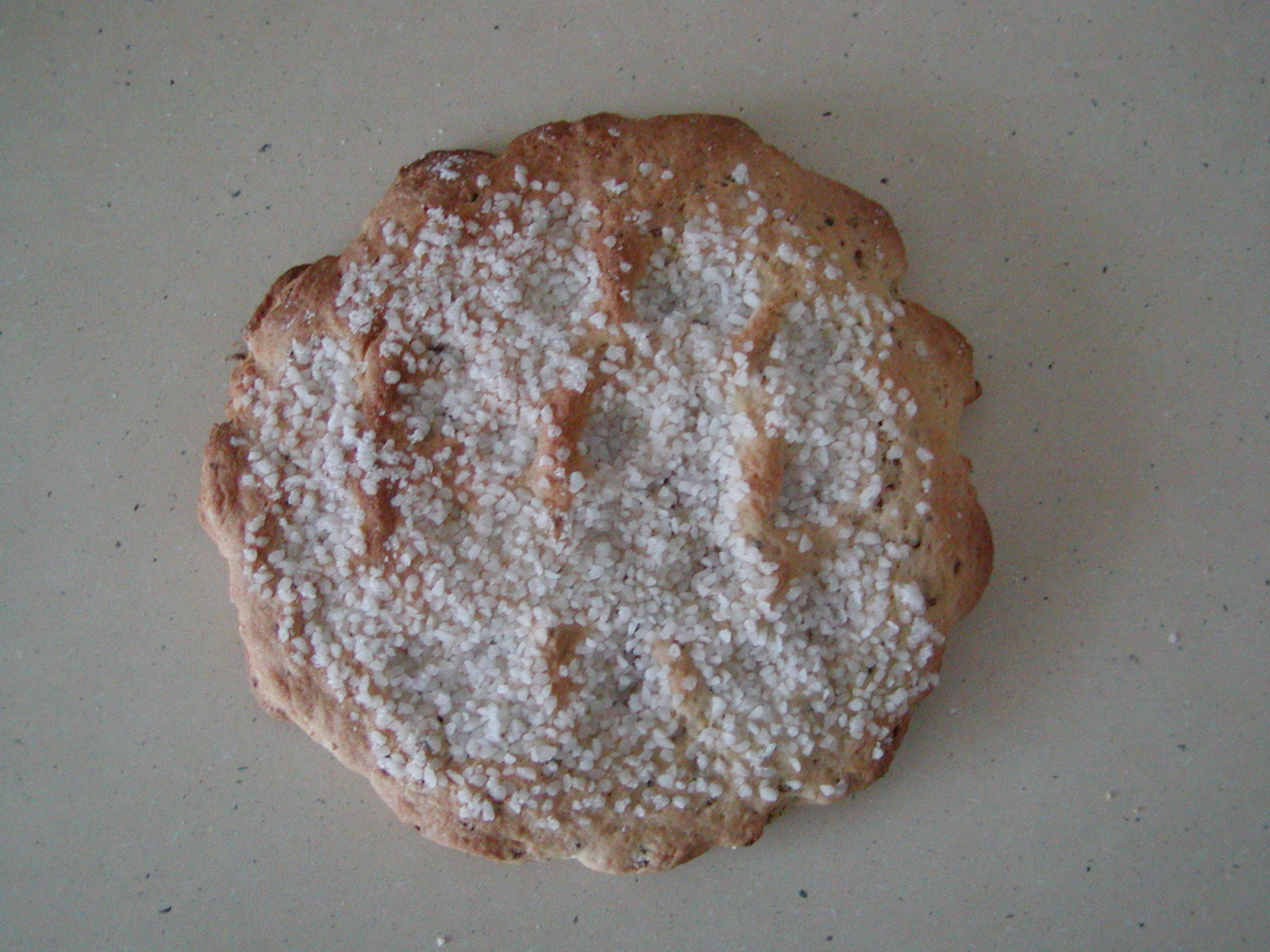
Inuliata, an Easter cake from Ajaccio

Several cakes are prepared for feasts and special occasions, and some are characteristic of one town or village: Strenna (a pie made with flour and sdruttu dough and a brocciu filling) is prepared in Vico for New Year's Day, panzarotti (beignets made with flour, rice and yeast) are prepared in Bastia for Saint Joseph's Day (19 March), panette for All Saints' Day (1 November), pan di i morti (also named uga siccati, small breads made with flour, yeast, sugar, butter, eggs, raisins and walnuts) for All Souls' Day (2 November) in Bonifacio, canestri (donuts made with flour, butter, eggs and sugar) and campanili (donuts made with flour, yeast, egg, shortening, raisins soaked in aquavita and sugar, decorated with boiled eggs) at Easter, sciacci (the sweet version of these fritters, stuffed with brocciu, and traditionally cooked on a hot granite stone named teghja) are prepared in Sartène at Easter and during sheep shearing, in May. Inuliata, prepared in Ajaccio during the Holy Week, is a yeast cake having flour, powdered sugar, olive oil and wine as ingredients. Fritelli, eaten at Maundy Thursday in Calenzana, are wheat or chestnut flour fritters.

Corsicans produce at home also many fruit preserves (confiture), having as main ingredients the island's fruits: chestnut (confitura di castagne), fig (confitura di fichi), red tomatoes (confitura di pummata rossi), strawberry tree (confitura d`arbitru). A specialty is the citron confit (confit d'alimea), which uses as main ingredient the fruits grown in the Cap Corse region.

== Sources ==
- Bertarelli, Luigi Vittorio (1929). Corsica. Guida d'Italia (in Italian). Rome: CTI.
- Schapira, Christiane (1994). La bonne cuisine corse (in French). Paris: Solar. ISBN 2263001778.
- Schapira, Laurence; Schapira, Christiane (1998). La Corse des châtaignes (in French). Paris: L'Astragale. ISBN 9782951244405.
- Cahier des charges de l'appellation d'origine protégée (PDF) (in French). Institut National des Appellations d'Origine. n.d. Archived from the original (PDF) on 2008-11-29.
- Silvani, Paul (1991). Cuisine corse d'antan - Cucina corsa di prima (in French). Ajaccio: La Marge. ISBN 2865230937.
