= Strenna (pie) =

Corsican pie

Strenna (Corsican: a strenna; from Latin: strēna, word probably of Sabine origin, with the meaning "gift of good luck", cf. Italian "Strenna") is a Corsican pie having generally a round shape. The pie is typical of the cuisine of Corsica and originates from the city of Vico in Corse-du-Sud. Strenna is prepared for New Year's Day, and given as present by villagers to relatives coming to offer new year's wishes.

== Ingredients ==
Its main ingredients are wheat flour, shortening (sdruttu), brocciu cheese, eggs, grated orange zest, egg yolk, sugar, olive oil and sugared milk. A dough is prepared with flour, sdruttu (lard or clarified pork fat), eggs and sugared milk. The dough is kneaded, left to rest and divided in two parts. Then brocciu is passed through a sieve and mixed with eggs, sugar, olive oil and grated orange zest to make the stuffing. The dough is rolled out in two disks of equal size: one is put in a cake pan greased with oil, and then is punched with a fork. The brocciu mix is put above it, then the other dough disk is put above the mix, punched with a fork and stuck to the lower dough layer by hands. The pie is brushed with egg yolk and baked one hour in warm oven.
