= Cacavellu =

Corsican cake

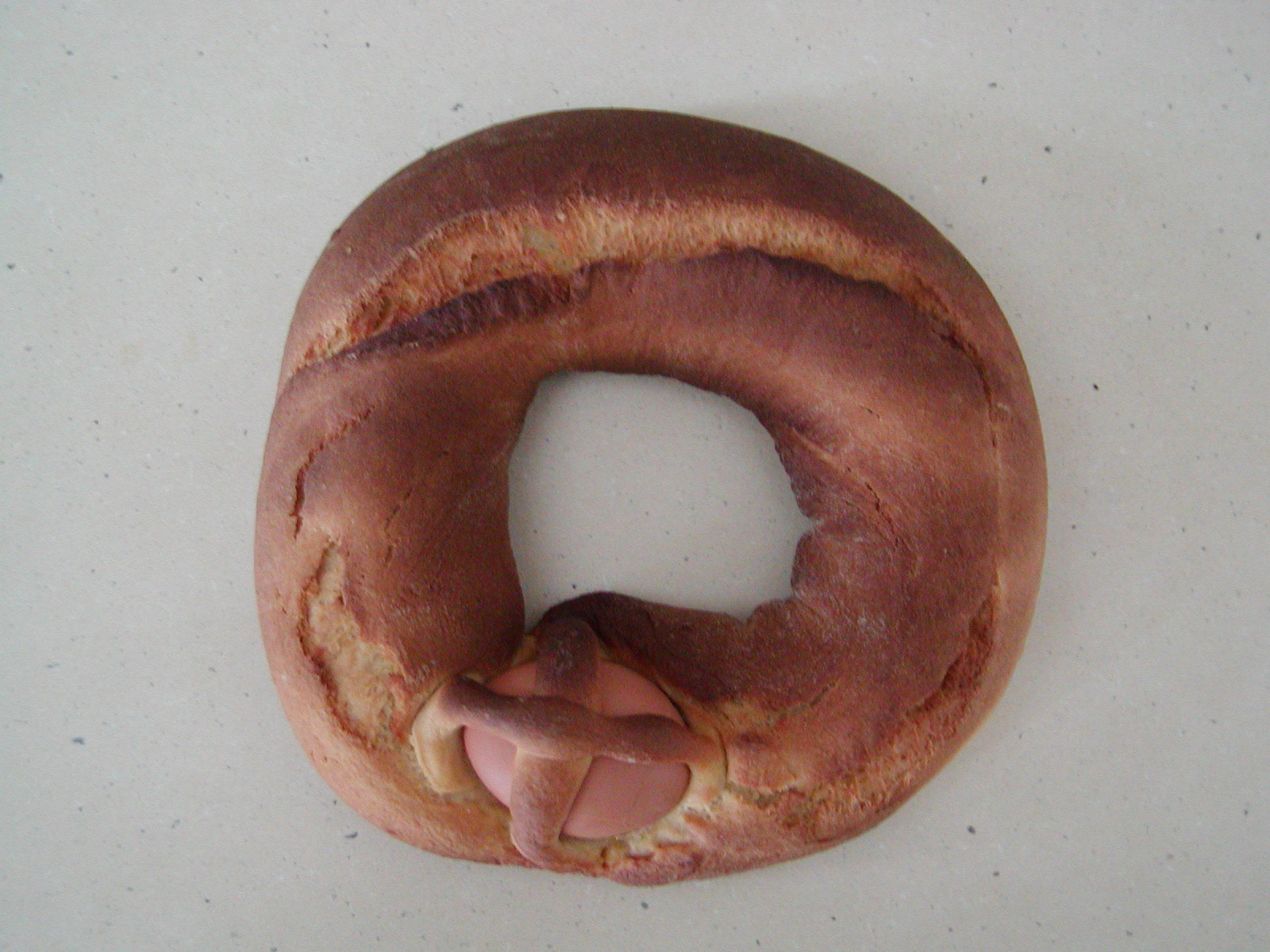
- Caccaveddu from Sartène
- Type: Sweet bread
- Place of origin: Corsica
- Main ingredients: yeast dough

Cacavellu (Corsican; pl. cacavelli; also caccavellu; caccaveddu in Suttanacciu dialect; from Latin: cacabus, lit. 'cooking pot') is a Corsican cake generally shaped as a crown, made of yeast dough. It is a typical dessert of the village of Vico.

In the cuisine of Corsica exists also a yeast cake called too caccaveddu, typical of the region around Sartène in southern Corsica: it is akin to the Campanile cake and like that is also traditionally prepared for Easter.

== Ingredients ==
Its main ingredients are wheat flour, yeast, salt, egg, sugar, shortening (sdruttu), aquavita, brocciu, grated orange zest and olive oil. After dissolving yeast in some warm water, flour, eggs, aquavita are mixed into a dough, which is kneaded and left to rest one hour. Then brocciu is passed through a sieve and mixed with eggs, sugar and grated orange zest. The dough is rolled out as a disk, the brocciu mix is put on its outer part, then a hole is made in the middle and the edges of the dough are raised and pressed together enclosing the mix in it, so that a doughnut results. The cake is put on a plate greased with olive oil and is baked one hour in warm oven.
