= Falculelle =

Corsican dessert

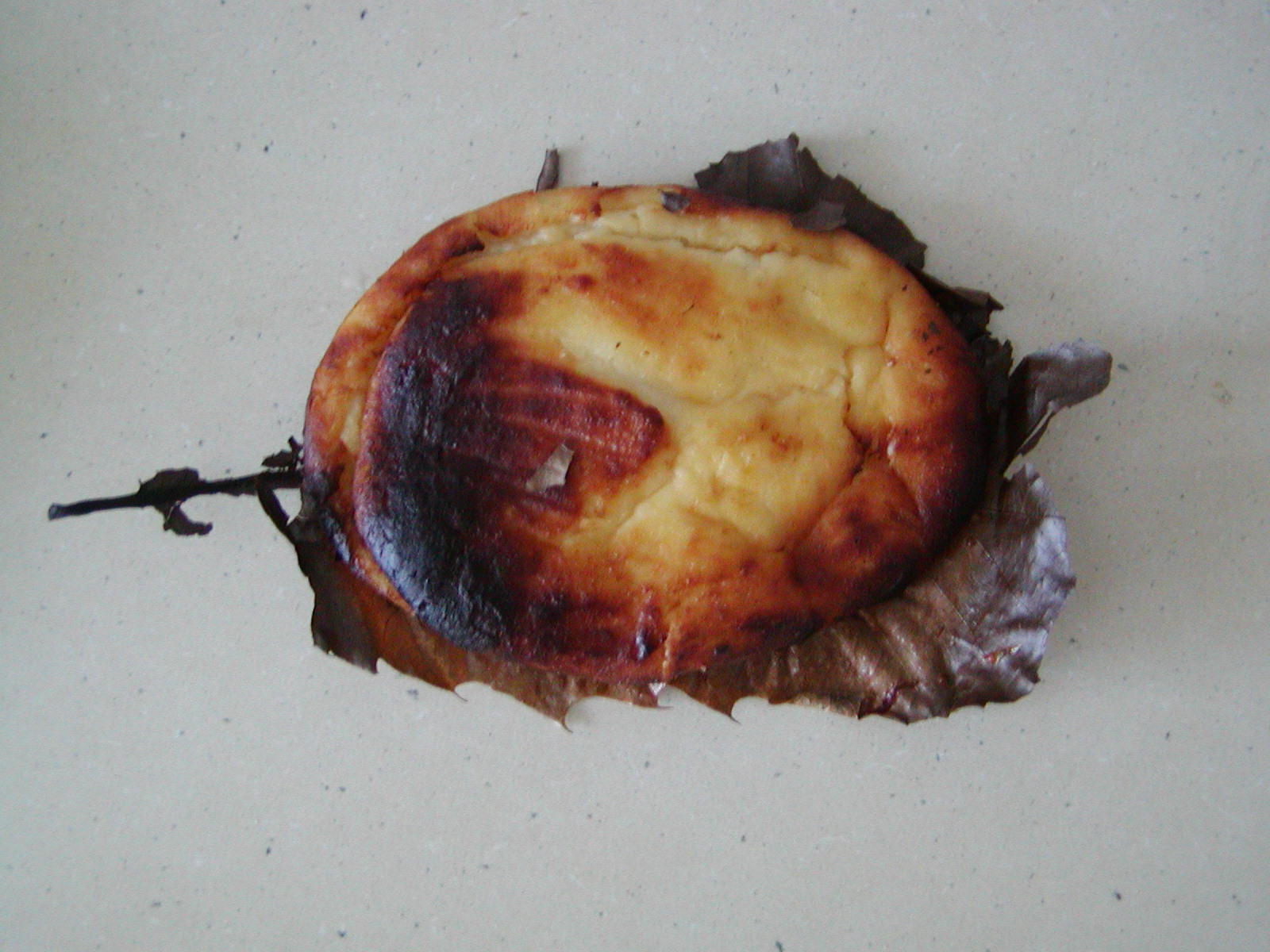
A falculella

Falculelle (singular: falculella) are a typical dessert of the Corsican cuisine.

Originally from Corte, they are small cakes prepared essentially mixing brocciu, egg yolk, flour, sugar and orange zest. This mixture is then baked on a chestnut leaf.

== Sources ==
- Schapira, Christiane (1994). La bonne cuisine corse (in French). Paris: Solar. ISBN 2263001778.
