= Fiadone =

Corsican cheesecake

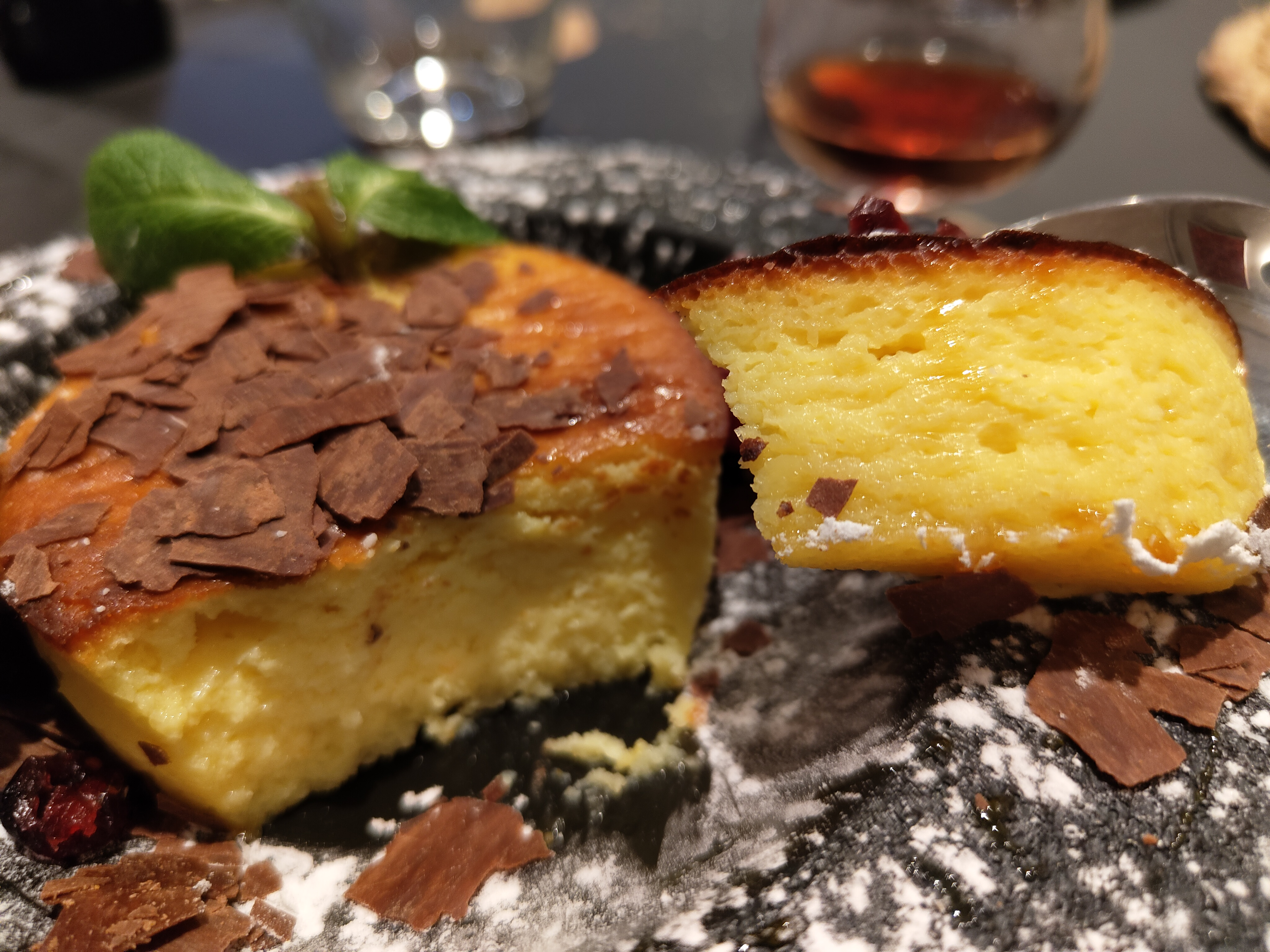
Corsican fiadone

Fiadone (Corsican; pl.: fiadoni) is a Corsican cheesecake without a bottom layer, made of brocciu, sugar, lemon zest and eggs. The fiadone can have a round or rectangular shape. It is baked in an oven and served cold.

Fiadoni are also very popular on mainland Italy, particularly in the regions of Abruzzo, Marche, Molise, and Lazio. In all these regions, the fiadone are made in a style of a baked sweet ravioli, cut in half-moon shapes, and usually filled with ricotta, lemon zest, sugar, and eggs. The only notable difference between the regions is that in Marche, where fiadoni are also called ‘piconi’ , many recipes call for the usage of pecorino cheese without ricotta cheese. Recipes that combine ricotta and pecorino also exist in both Marche and Abruzzo. Regardless, in all regions, they are made and consumed around Easter, however some families also make them for Christmas.

Fiadoni, thanks to the immigration of marchigiani and abruzzesi, have found their way to Norrh America as well amongst the Italian diaspora, particularly in Canada amongst Italian Canadians.

== Bibliography ==
- Schapira, Christiane (1994). La bonne cuisine corse (in French). Paris: Solar. ISBN 2263001778.
