= Strozzapreti =

Type of pasta

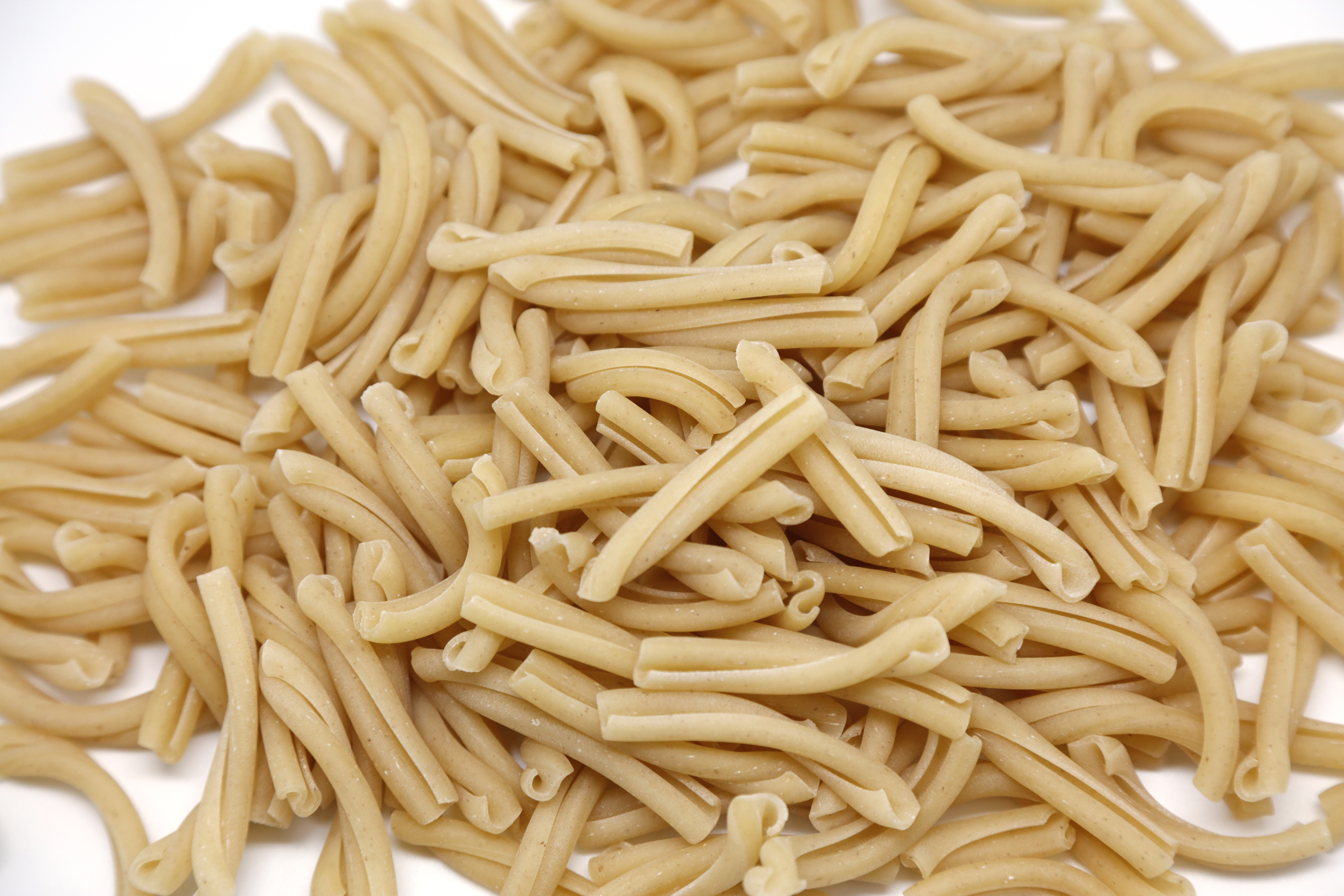
- Uncooked strozzapreti from Romagna
- Type: Pasta
- Place of origin: Italy

Strozzapreti (Italian: [ˌstrɔttsaˈprɛːti]; lit. 'priest choker' or 'priest strangler') are hand-made pasta shape, similar to cavatelli, though longer. The name is also used for a baked cheese and vegetable dumpling, prepared in some regions of Italy.

== Etymology ==
There are several legends to explain the name, primarily based on the anticlerical sentiment of the region.

One is that gluttonous priests were so enthralled by the savory pasta that they ate too quickly and choked themselves. Another explanation involves the azdora ('housewife' in the Romagna dialect), who "chokes" the dough strips to make the strozzapreti. The azdora would express rage (perhaps triggered by the misery and difficulties of her life) and curse the local clergy, resulting in a pasta that could choke a priest. A third states that wives would customarily make the pasta for churchmen as partial payment for land rents (in Romagna, the Catholic Church had extensive land properties rented to farmers), and their husbands would be angered enough by the venal priests eating their wives' food to wish the priests would choke as they stuffed their mouths with it. The name surely reflects the diffuse anticlericalism of the people of Romagna and Tuscany.

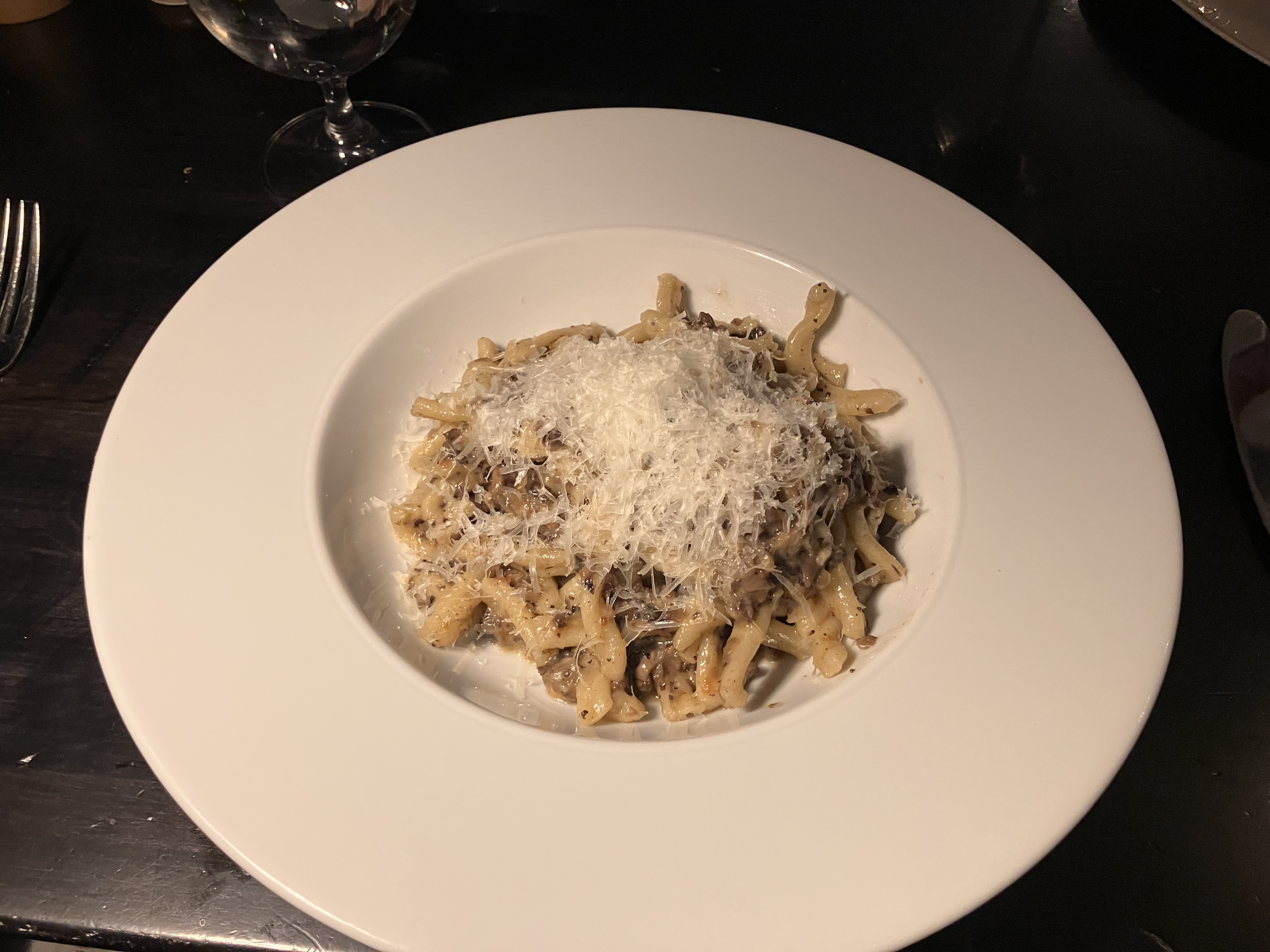
A Mushroom Strozzapreti dish

Another possible explanation is that following Sunday Mass, it was common for the priest to visit homes of the villagers and enjoy dinner with them. The more pleasant experiences for the priest would entice them to come back to that particular home more frequently. As a means for the family to let the priest know that he might be overextending his welcome, they would serve this pasta which had later earned the name strozzapreti. Another origin story is that the pasta resembles a clerical collar, commonly referred to as a "priest choker".

== Description ==
The name strozzapreti can refer either to a fresh pasta type or to a gnocchi type.

=== Pasta types ===
- In the cuisine of Romagna strozzapreti are short twisted cords obtained by hand from water and flour pasta, as shown on Sonia Peronaci's website. In the countryside between Faenza and Lugo, strozzapreti col nodo are widespread, obtained by knotting each piece of pasta after twisting it on itself.
- In the cuisine of Imola and Ravenna between the end of the 1800s and the middle of the 1900s, strozzapreti were called "suffocated priests", a terminology that has since disappeared, and were slightly larger.
- In Emilia the dough is made from flour, water, Parmesan cheese, and egg whites, all beaten together.
- In Umbrian cuisine the term strozzapreti or strangozzi means a long pasta with a square section made of water and flour.
- In the Roman cuisine the strozzapreti are spaghettoni pulled by hand. In the area of Viterbo, the stratto is a handmade pasta, typical of the town of Blera, seasoned with tartufi.
- In the city of L'Aquila in Abruzzo the strangolapreti are big cords of pasta of Triticum durum about 20 cm long.
- Pici is a somewhat similar form of pasta from Tuscany in which hand-rolled, solid fat tubes of dough are cut but left untwisted; the taut, rope-like appearance provides yet another popular explanation for the association with strangling.

The dough (see some regional variations below) is rolled out in thick flat sheets. It is then cut into strips. The strips are lightly rolled or twisted between the palms. The large pasta is separated into 10 cm pieces by pinching. Unlike spaghetti or macaroni, this pasta is not uniform in size or shape.

=== Gnocchi types ===
- In the Trentino cuisine and in the Milanese cuisine the strangolapreti are gnocchi made of stale bread, spinach, eggs and grana cheese from Trentino, served with melted butter and sage. In Milanese and Larian cuisine, soft cheese is also added.
- In the Neapolitan cuisine with the term strangulapriévete are designated simple gnocchi, made at home with water and flour.
- In the Salentine cuisine strangulaprevati means potato dumplings.
- In Calabrian cuisine, strangugliapreviti are dumplings made of flour and eggs; in the Nicastrese tradition they are the dish of Martedì Grasso (the Italian Mardi Gras).
- In Corsican cuisine the name sturzapréti refers also to large gnocchi made of cheese and vegetables, and then baked. Seasoned spinach or chard is rolled into balls together with brocciu cheese, and then baked in the oven. These balls are large enough to choke a person if eaten whole.

== See also ==
- List of pasta

== Bibliography ==
- Gosetti Della Salda, Anna (1967). Le ricette regionali italiane (in Italian). Milano: Solares.
