= Hyblean ricotta =

Italian dairy product

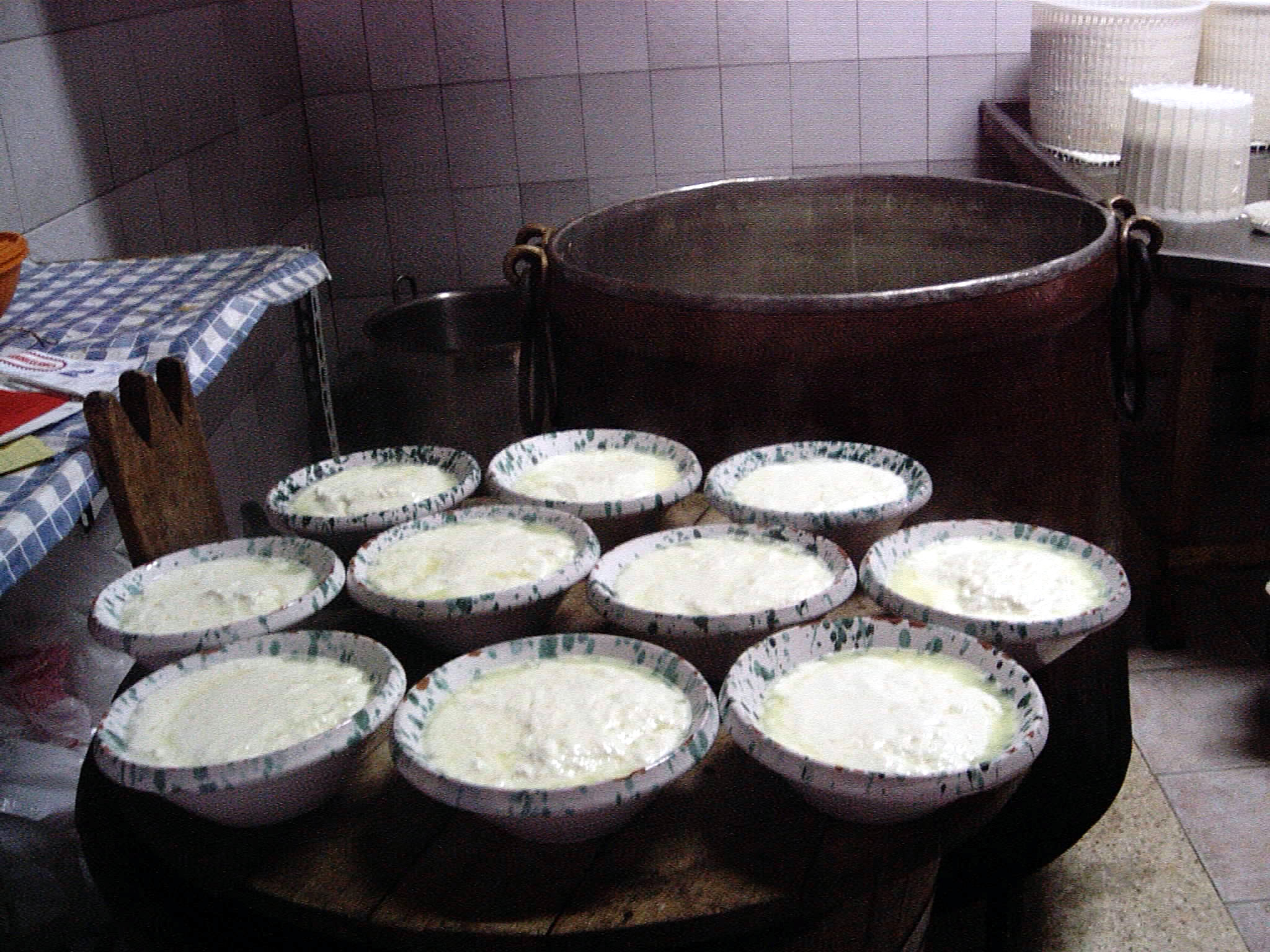
- Country of origin: Italy
- Region, town: Libero consorzio comunale di Ragusa
- Region: Sicily
- Source of milk: Cow
- Pasteurized: Yes
- Fat content: 8%
- Certification: Italy: PAT from 2000

The Hyblean ricotta is a dairy product derived from the whey produced in Libero consorzio comunale di Ragusa and is recognized as a prodotto agroalimentare tradizionale since 2000.

== Milk ==
The milk used to produce the classic ricotta iblea is that of the wild and autochthonous breed Modicana, producer of Protected Designation of Origin milk, bred in the wild mainly on the highlands between Modica and Ragusa in the pastures enclosed in the classic dry stone walls characteristic of the area. Iblea ricotta can also be produced with mixed milk, that is, deriving from various breeds, with the addition of whole and raw milk up to 10%. Ragusan milk has unique characteristics, containing hints of spontaneous Hyblaean mountain vegetation such as fresh mushrooms, orange, freshly cut grass and floral traces typical of the area, such as calendula, anthemis, malva silvestris, geranium, and jasmine.

== Preparation ==
The preparation procedure takes place according to the traditional Ragusan method, different from other processes.

== Consumption of hot ricotta ==
For the consumption of freshly made ricotta, in the various farms scattered throughout the territory, typical terracotta cups are used which have a mixed shape between a soup plate and a bowl, usually it is accompanied with homemade bread.

== Use in the pastry shop ==
Contrary to the pastry tradition of most of Sicily, which uses sheep ricotta, Hyblean ricotta is traditionally used in the local pastry and in some areas of the Syracusan. Among the sweets generally considered among the best on the island, there are also those based on ricotta iblea.
