= Inuliata =

Yeast cake from Corsica

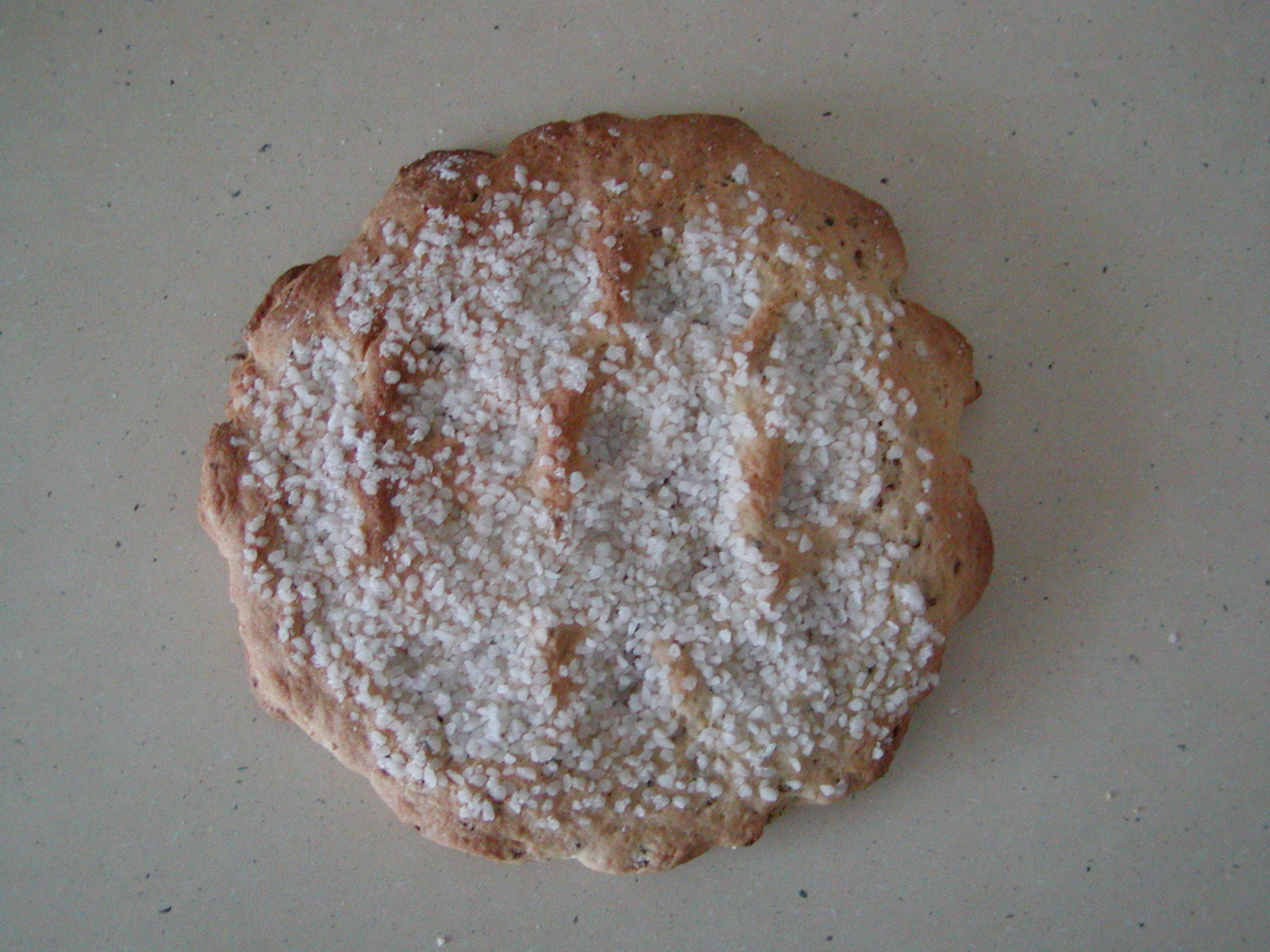
Inuliata

Inuliata (Corsican; sometime frencified in inuliate; pl. inuliate; meaning: "oiled" ) is a Corsican cake generally shaped as a circle, made of yeast dough. The cake is typical of the cuisine of Corsica and originates from the city of Ajaccio in Corse-du-Sud. Inuliata is prepared during the Easter week.

== Ingredients ==
Its main ingredients are wheat flour, yeast, powdered sugar, olive oil and dry white wine. A dough is prepared with flour, almost all the sugar and the oil, white wine at yeast dissolved in some water. The dough is kneaded, left to rest and rolled out in a circle 1.5 cm high. Its edges are thoroughly pinched by hands and the dough is pierced with a fork. The cake is brushed with olive oil (thence its name), dusted with the rest of the sugar, put on a plate greased with olive oil and baked one hour in moderate oven.
