= Ricotta di fuscella =

Italian cheese

Ricotta di fuscella is a fresh cow's milk cheese made in the Campania region of Italy. It is recognized as a PAT product.

== Etymology ==
The name derives from the Neapolitan fiscella, which indicates the perforated basket in the shape of a truncated cone in which the cheese is transported and sold. The fiscella is traditionally made with braided reeds or wicker. The term fuscella indicates another cheesemaking tool commonly used in the production of ricotta, which is made with food-grade plastic. It has a truncated cone shape and is perforated with small holes.

== Characteristics ==
Ricotta di fuscella has a truncated pyramidal shape, with each cheese weighing under 4.4 pounds (2.0 kg). It has a porcelain white color, is crustless, and has a soft consistency with a delicate, sweet flavor.

== Production process ==
The milk, which can be either raw or pasteurized, is filtered and refrigerated. It then is salted and brought to 183.2–185 °F (84.0–85.0 °C) and acidified. After around 30 minutes, while maintaining the temperature in the aforementioned range, the coagulated mass is separated and placed in perforated baskets (fuscelle) and preserved in ice for ten days. Organic acids and chemical pH correctors are not used. In the final step, the ricotta is covered in a protective wrapper and is preserved and sold without preserving liquid.

== Production zones ==
The production of this cheese occurs throughout the entire province of Naples, and is consolidated in the comune (municipality) of Sant'Anastasia, historically known for its thriving goat raising operations, whose milk guarantees production in the entire region.

== Uses ==
Ricotta di fuscella is eaten alone or used in the preparation of many traditional dishes of Campania, from stuffed pastas to desserts such as pastiera.

== See also ==
- Ricotta
- Ricotta forte
- Ricotta salata
