= Canestru =

Corsican cake made of brioche dough

Canestru (Corsican; pl. canestri, from Latin: canistrum, meaning a circular basket) is a Corsican cake generally shaped as a circle, made of brioche dough. The cake is typical of the cuisine of Corsica and originates from the village of Petreto-Bicchisano in Corse-du-Sud. Canestru is a traditional Easter cake, and is typically consumed during the traditional Easter Monday picnic (Corsican: a merendella).

== Ingredients ==
Its main ingredients are wheat flour, yeast, salt, eggs, shortening (sdruttu), white wine, pastis or anise seeds. The dough should rest two hours at room temperature before being kneaded. Then it should rise thirty to forty five minutes before being baked golden brown and baked again in a warm oven (150° to 220°).

== Sources ==
- Schapira, Christiane (1994). La bonne cuisine corse (in French). Paris: Solar. ISBN 2263001778.
