= Cujuelle =

Type of biscuit

Cujuelle de Calenzana are biscuits popular in Calenzana, Corsica. In other parts of Corsica, they are known as canistrelli or cocciole, but these are all fundamentally the same product. The biscuits are made with local raw materials, including white wine from the Patrimonio vineyards, sugar, flour and oil. Cujuelle are typically rhomboid (diamond-shaped), and come in several flavor varieties including almond, anise, lemon and chocolate. They are typically consumed by dunking in milk or muscat wine.

== History ==
Cujuelle biscuits have been produced commercially in an artisanal factory in Calenzana since 1984. A similar product, Cujuelle de Zilla, began production in 1997. The recipe has remained the same since the factories' founding. Little is known of the history of the recipe prior to that.

== Evolution ==
Over the course of the years, many variations of the basic product have been invented, with some ingredients added and others left behind. For example, some varieties leave out the white wine and other varieties include ingredients such as chocolate chips, raisins and nuts, and consequently change the name of the product. For example, the variant that includes nuts is called biscuits aux noisettes [biscuits with hazelnuts], while another variant is named biscuits avec raisins, noisettes et amandes [biscuits with raisins, hazelnuts and almonds], while a third is named Canestrelli a l'Anis [canestrelli with anise].

== Producers ==
Presently, several brands sell cujuelle biscuits. The main producers are Christian Perrin and Franck Dupré, both local bakers operating out of the Haute-Corse region. Perrin runs a small bakeshop in Calenzana, while Perrin runs a farm in the district and produces the cujuelle as a side business.
