= Migliacciu =

Migliacciu (Corsican: pl. migliacci) is a specialty of Corsican cuisine. It is a savory preparation based on goat or sheep milk products. The migliacci can be cooked over a wood fire or in the oven and eaten warm or cold. Their preparation requires a dough made of wheat flour, salt, whey, yeast and cheese cut into small dices. The dough should rise for a few hours. Afterwards, it is divided into round galettes one cm thick and fifteen cm in diameter, on which is spread a mixture of egg and milk. After resting, migliacci are cooked for fifteen minutes on chestnut leaves.
