= Campanile (cake) =

Crown-shaped Corsican cake

Campanile (Corsican: u campanile), meaning "the bell tower", pl. campanili) is a Corsican cake generally shaped like a crown, made of yeast dough. It is a typical dessert of the cuisine of Corsica and is a traditional Easter cake: the boiled eggs in the cake look like little bells inside the bell tower and represent the renewed fertility of the earth after the end of winter, remembering also the tradition to unleash the bells at Easter, after having tethered them at Good Friday.

The campanile is similar to southern Italian Easter cakes, like the Sicilian campanaru (whose name has the same meaning).

In southern Corsica, in the region around Sartène, an Easter cake akin to the Campanile and called Caccaveddu is baked instead.

== Ingredients ==
Its main ingredients are wheat flour, yeast, salt, egg, sugar, shortening (sdruttu) or olive oil, aquavita, raisins, boiled eggs and egg yolk. Raisins are soaked in aquavita, then all the ingredients except the boiled eggs and the yolk are kneaded to form a dough. After leaving the dough to rise, this is shaped as a doughnut, and the boiled eggs, bounded with dough ribbons, are sunken in it. The egg yolk is brushed on the dough to make it golden, and the cake is baked in warm oven for 50 m.

== Sources ==
- Schapira, Christiane (1994). La bonne cuisine corse (in French). Paris: Solar. ISBN 2263001778.
