= Rigouta =

Tunisian whey cheese

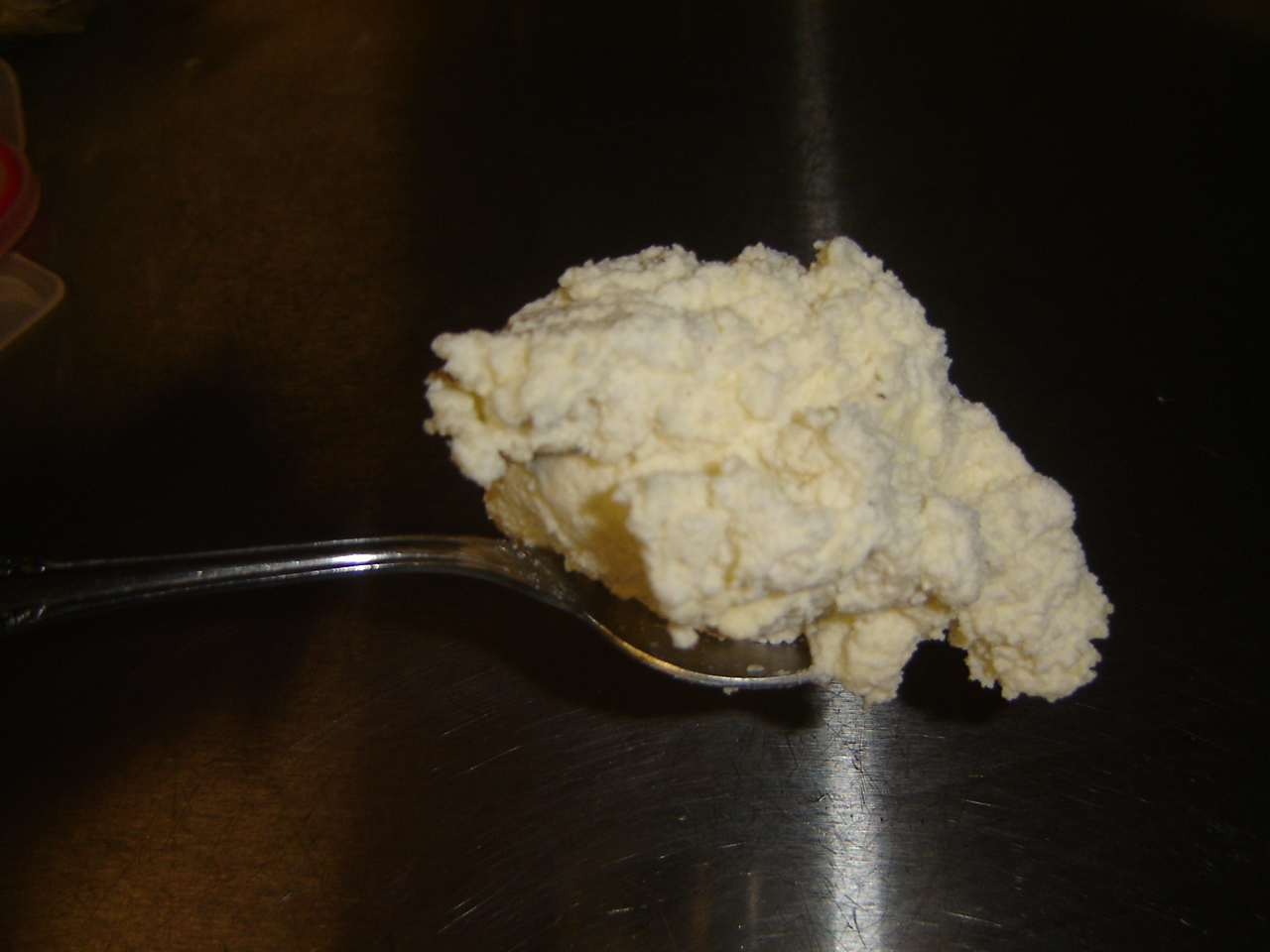
- Country of origin: Tunisia
- Source of milk: Sheep
- Texture: fresh soft
- Aging time: 1 week

Rigouta is a Tunisian fresh soft cheese, produced mainly in the city of Béja. The cheese is a close relative to the Italian ricotta and is made with the whey of Sicilo-Sarda sheep.

== Production and usage ==
Whey is heated at 80-90 °C to coagulate the proteins (albumins and globulins); the result is then drained in small traditional straw baskets, a clean fabric, or a perforated receptacle made of plastic or metal. The main micro-organisms responsible for the fermentation are Lactococcus lactis and Enterococcus faecalis.

Rigouta is also used as the basis of several preparations and dishes of Tunisian cuisine.
