= Ricotta forte =

Italian cheese

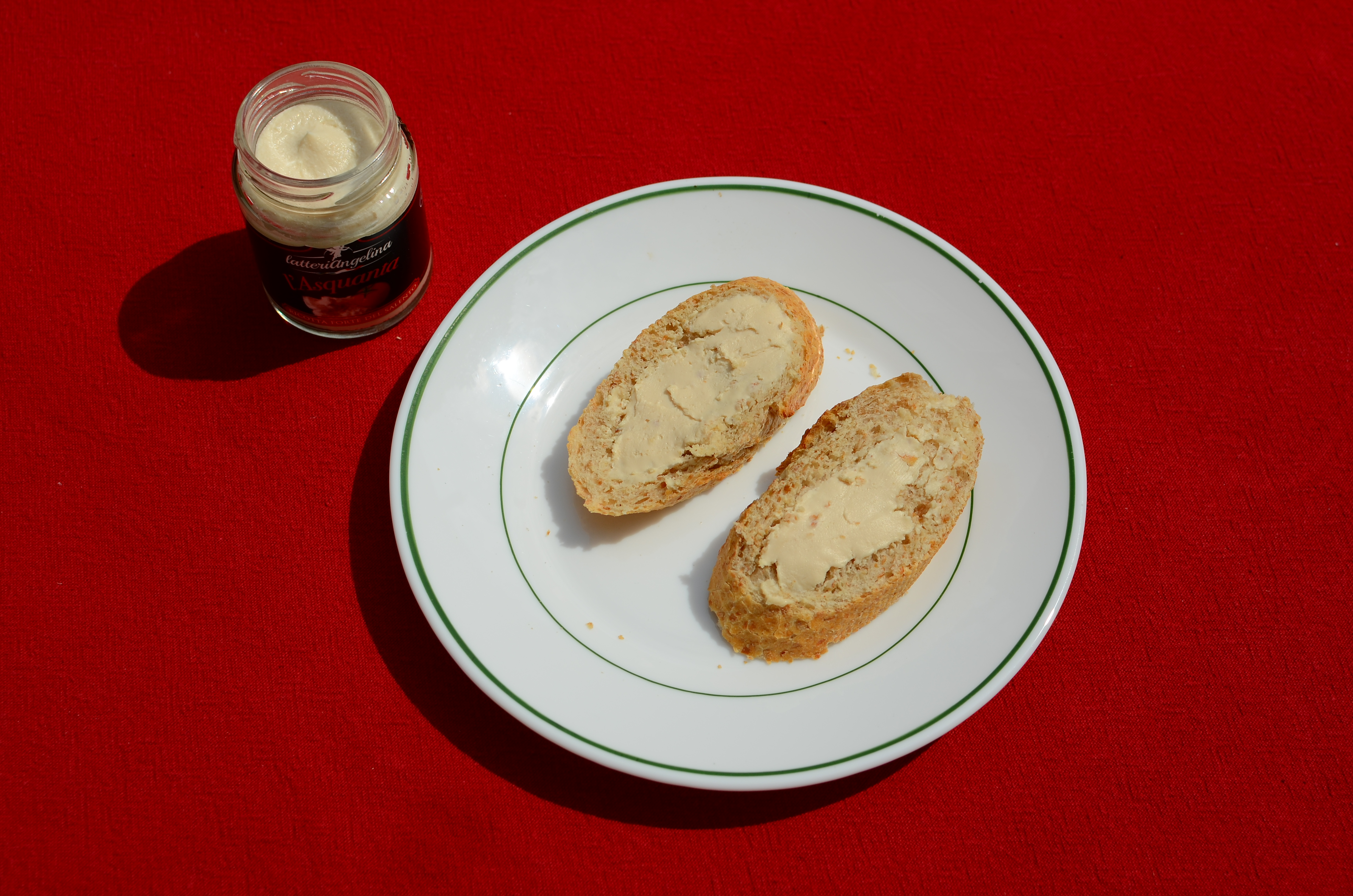
- Other names: Ricotta 'scante, scanta, ascuante, squant (from the Latin ustulo which means to burn due to its taste)
- Country of origin: Italy
- Region: Basilicata; Apulia
- Texture: Soft
- Certification: PAT

Ricotta forte (lit. 'strong ricotta') is a very traditional soft cheese of Basilicata and Apulia, in southeastern Italy. It is creamy, spicy, and slightly bitter.

Its preparation is similar to the Greek cheese called "kopanisti": the milk is fermented by bacteria and yeast which contribute to the spicy taste and to the very intense aroma. The aroma is similar to the long-seasoned pecorino.

Writing from an American perspective, food writer Erica De Mane describes the taste as "like whipped, extremely pungent blue cheese, not, in my opinion, in a completely appealing way."

This cheese is typically used on pasta with tomato sauce, on bread with anchovies or in fried panzerotti.

It has been recognised by the Ministry of Agricultural, Food and Forestry Policies as a Lucanian and Apulian traditional food product (PAT).

== See also ==
- List of Italian cheeses
- Ricotta
- Ricotta di fuscella
- Ricotta salata
