= Ricotta =

Italian whey cheese

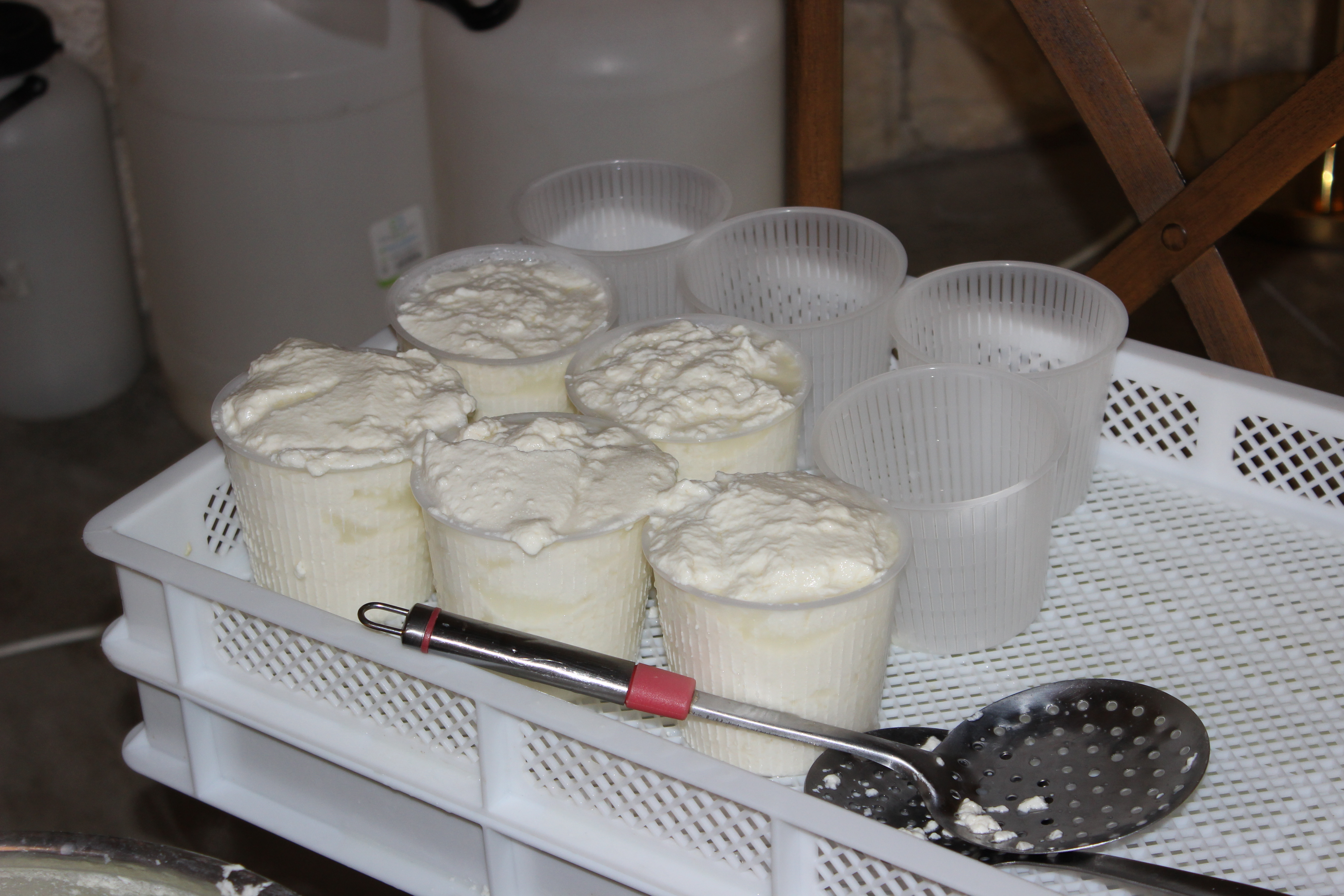
- Country of origin: Italy
- Source of milk: Sheep, cows, goats, or Italian water buffalo
- Pasteurised: No
- Texture: Dependent on variety, fresh soft to aged semisoft
- Aging time: None or up to a year for aged varieties

Ricotta (Italian: [riˈkɔtta]) is an Italian whey cheese made from sheep, cow, goat, or Italian water buffalo milk whey left over from the production of other cheeses. However, modern ricotta is often made from milk instead of whey. Like other whey cheeses, it is made by coagulating the proteins that remain after the casein has been used to make cheese, notably albumin and globulin.

Ricotta (lit. 'recooked' or 'refined') protein can be harvested if the whey is first allowed to become more acidic by additional fermentation (by letting it sit for 12–24 hours at room temperature). Then the acidified whey is heated to near boiling. The combination of low pH and high temperature denatures the protein and causes it to flocculate, forming a fine curd. Once cooled, it is separated by passing the liquid through a fine cloth, leaving the curd behind.

Ricotta curds are creamy white in appearance, and slightly sweet in taste. The fat content varies depending on the milk used. In this form, it is somewhat similar in texture to some fresh cheese variants, though considerably lighter. It is highly perishable; however, ricotta is also made in aged varieties which are preservable for much longer.

== History ==
The production of ricotta in the Italian peninsula dates back to the Bronze Age. In the second millennium BC, ceramic vessels called milk boilers started to appear frequently and were apparently unique to the peninsula. These were designed to boil milk yet prevent it from boiling over. The fresh acid-coagulated cheeses produced with these boilers were probably made with whole milk.

The production of rennet-coagulated cheese, though, overtook the production of fresh whole-milk cheeses during the first millennium BC. Bronze cheese graters found in the graves of the Etruscan elite prove that hard-grating cheeses were popular with the aristocracy. Cheese graters were also commonly used in ancient Roman kitchens. Unlike the fresh acid-coagulated cheese, aged rennet-coagulated cheese could be preserved for much longer.

The increased production of rennet-coagulated cheese led to a large supply of sweet whey as a byproduct. Cheesemakers then started using a new recipe, which used a mixture of whey and milk to make the traditional ricotta as it is known today.

The ancient Romans made ricotta, but writers on agriculture, such as Cato the Elder, Marcus Terentius Varro, and Columella, do not mention it. They described the production of rennet-coagulated cheese, but did not write about milk boilers or acid-coagulated cheese. A likely reason is that ricotta was not profitable because its very short shelf life did not allow distribution to urban markets. Ricotta was most likely consumed by the herders who made it. Even so, evidence from paintings and literature indicates that ricotta was known and likely eaten by Roman aristocrats, as well.

Ceramic milk boilers were still used by Apennine herders to make ricotta in the 19th century AD. Today, metal milk boilers are used, but production methods have changed little since ancient times.

== Manufacturing process ==
Whey proteins are some of the many kinds of milk proteins. The production process entails the use of heat and acid to coagulate whey protein from whey solution. The whey solution is heated to a near-boiling temperature, much hotter than during the production of the original cheese, of which the whey is a remnant.

== Fresh variants ==
Ricotta di bufala campana and ricotta romana are notable varieties produced in Italy and protected by the European Union's protected designation of origin regulation. Ricotta di bufala campana is made from the whey left over after the production of mozzarella di bufala campana, a protected variety of buffalo mozzarella. Ricotta romana is made from the whey of sheep milk.

== Aged variants ==
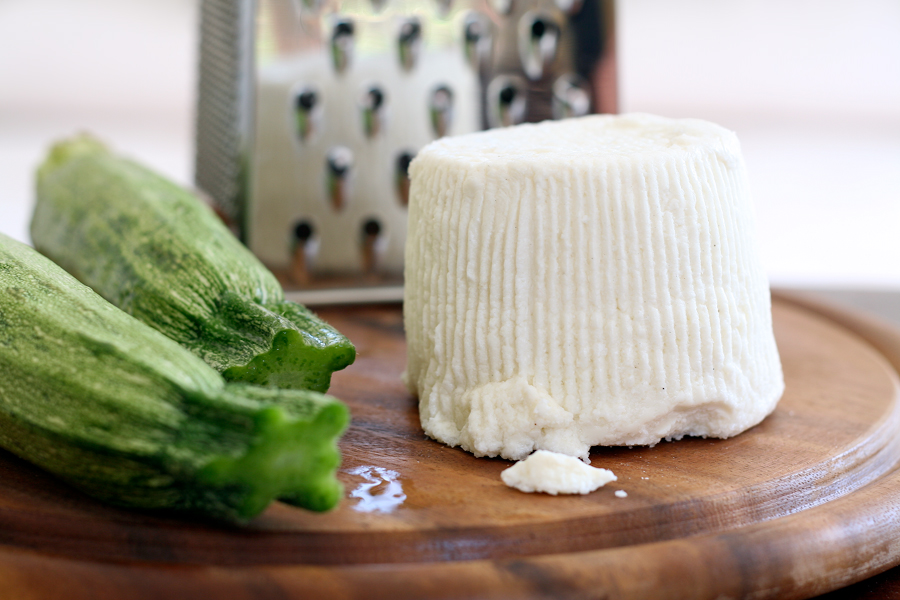
Ricotta salata is a firm, salted variety of ricotta.

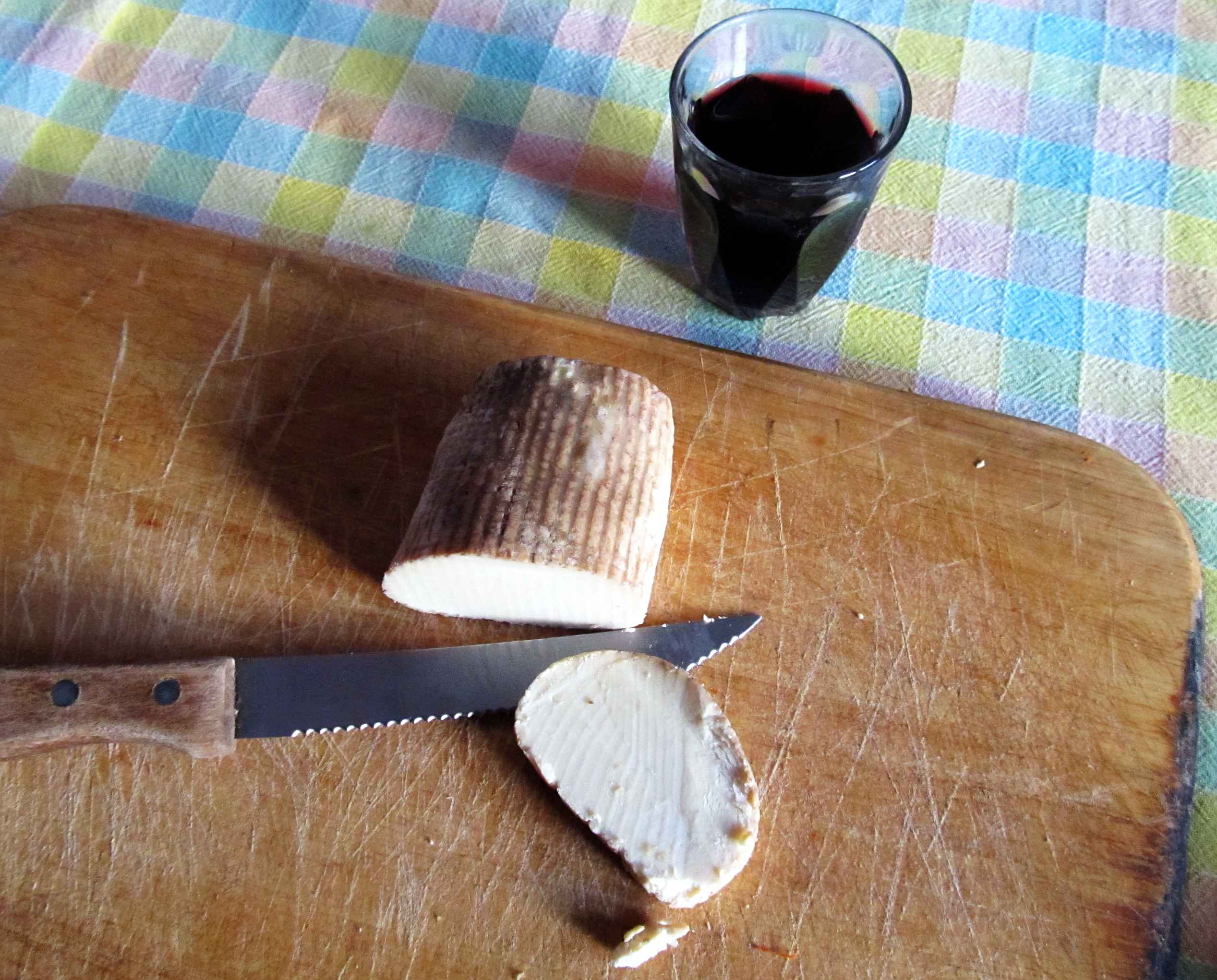
Ricotta affumicata, a smoked variety from the Sila, in Calabria

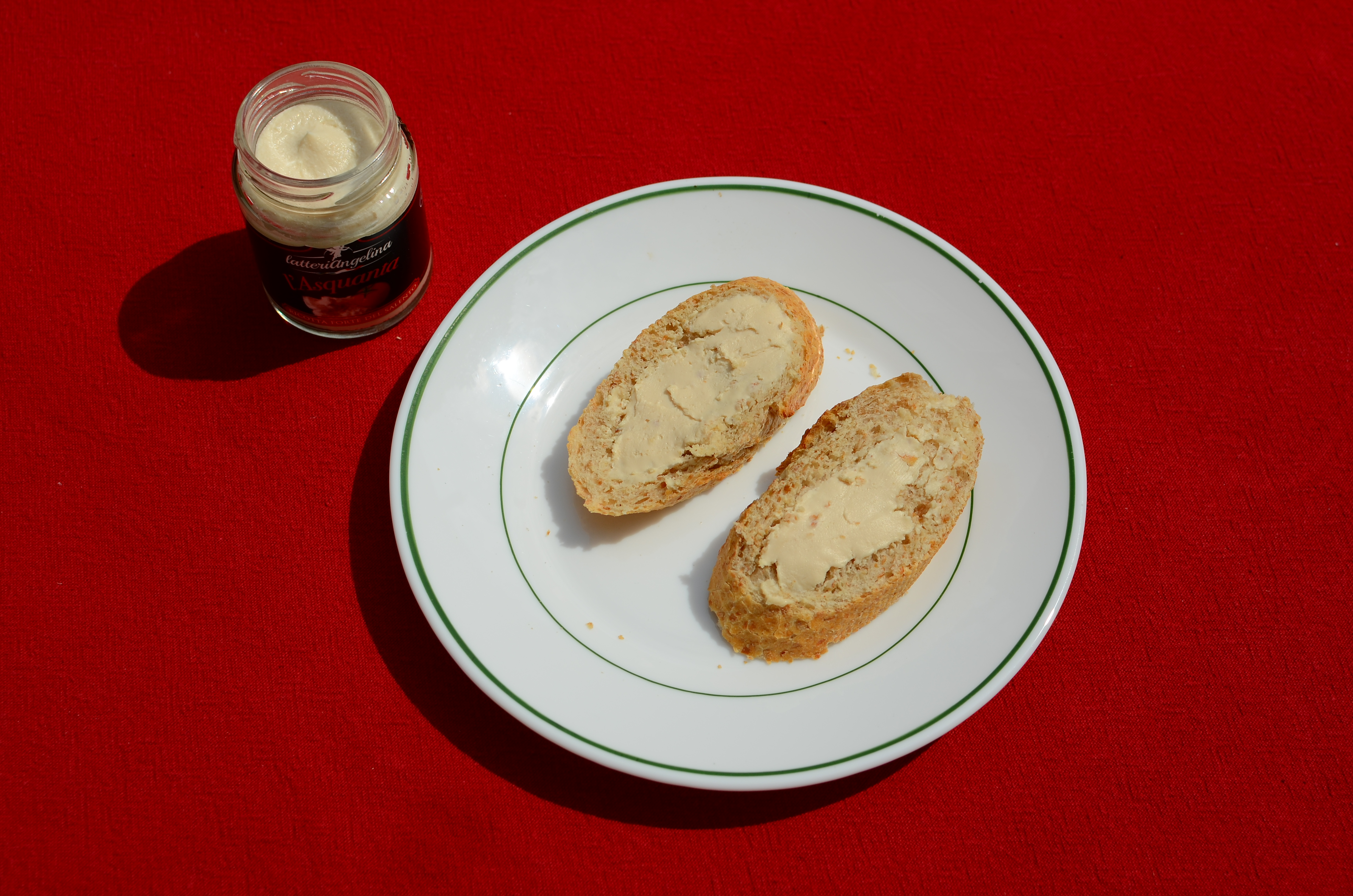
Ricotta forte is a very soft variety from Apulia sold in jars.

Fresh ricotta can be subject to extra processing to produce variants which have a much longer shelf life. These production methods include salting, baking, smoking, and further fermentation.

Ricotta salata is a pressed, salted, dried, and aged variety of the cheese, typically using ricottas made with sheep's milk sourced from Lazio. It is milky-white and firm, and is used as a table cheese or for grating or shaving over dishes, particularly pastas made fresh from water and flour. Ricotta salata is sold in wheels, decorated by a delicate basket-weave pattern.

Ricotta infornata (lit. 'baked ricotta') is produced by placing a large lump of soft ricotta in the oven until it develops a brown, lightly charred crust, sometimes even until it becomes sandy brown all the way through. Ricotta infornata is popular primarily in Sardinia and Sicily, and is sometimes called ricotta al forno.

Ricotta affumicata (lit. 'smoked ricotta') is similar to ricotta infornata and is produced by placing a lump of soft ricotta in a smoker until it develops a grey crust and acquires a charred wood scent, usually of oak or chestnut wood, although, in Friuli, beech wood is used, with the addition of juniper and herbs.

Ricotta forte, also known as ricotta scanta, is produced from leftovers of any combination of cow, goat, or sheep milk ricotta. These are allowed to age for about a year, during which salt is added and the cheese mixed every two or three days to prevent the growth of mold. The end result is a soft and creamy brown paste which has a very pungent and piquant taste. It is produced in the southern part of the province of Lecce and sold in glass jars. It is smeared on bread, mixed with tomato sauces for pasta, or added to vegetable dishes.

== Common culinary uses ==
Like mascarpone in northern Italian cuisine, ricotta is a favorite component of many Italian desserts, such as cheesecakes and cannoli. Also, a variety of different cookies include ricotta as an ingredient.

Ricotta can be beaten smooth and mixed with condiments, such as sugar, cinnamon, orange flower water, strawberries, and occasionally chocolate shavings, and served as a dessert. This basic combination (often with additions such as citrus and pistachios) also features prominently as the filling of the Sicilian cannoli and layered with slices of cake in Palermo's cassata.

Combined with eggs and cooked grains, then baked firm, ricotta is also a main ingredient in Neapolitan pastiera, one of Italy's many "Easter pies".

Ricotta is also commonly used in savory dishes, including pasta, calzone, stromboli, pizza, manicotti, lasagne, and ravioli.

It also is used as a mayonnaise substitute in traditional egg or tuna salad and as a sauce thickener.

== Similar non-Italian cheeses ==
Ricotta made in the United States is almost always made of cow's milk whey, as opposed to Italian ricotta, which is typically made from the whey of sheep, cow, goat, or Italian water buffalo milk. While both types are low in fat and sodium, the Italian version is naturally sweet, while the American is a little saltier and moister.

In southern Switzerland, a similar ricotta is made, although it is often called mascarpa. It is historically a staple food in the mountains. Equivalent whey cheeses (Ziger, Sérac) are produced in the rest of the country.

In France, ricotta is known as recuite and can be made from cow, sheep, or goat milk. The name and technique of preparation change according to the region where it is produced: it is called Greuil, Breuil or Sérou in Gascony, Zenbera in the Basque country, Brousse in Provence, Brocciu in Corsica and Sérac in the Alps.

In Malta, a traditional cow's milk cheese known as irkotta is made almost identically to the Italian ricotta, with the exception that it is generally made using fresh milk rather than from residual whey, which gives it a slightly firmer, crumblier texture than the Italian variety. Regardless, irkotta is used in very similar ways to Italian ricotta within Maltese cooking, being a primary filling for savoury dishes like ravioli and pies, as well as sweet dishes such as cannoli and cakes. It is also one of the two traditional fillings for pastizz, a local savoury pastry snack, with the other being mushy peas.

In Tunisia, rigouta from the city of Béja is a close relative to ricotta, except that it is always fresh-soft and is not aged. It is exclusively made from the whey of Sicilo-Sarda sheep's milk. Rigouta is also used as the basis of several preparations and dishes of Tunisian cuisine.

In Spain, ricotta is known as requesón. It can be salted or sweetened for cooking purposes. It was brought to Mexico by the Spaniards, although it is not as commonly used as queso fresco. It is sometimes used as filling for tlacoyos and tacos dorados, and in the central west area (Jalisco, Michoacán, and Colima) it is spread over tostadas or bolillos, or served as a side to beans. In Portugal and Brazil, a similar product is called requeijão.

In the Balkans, Romanian urdă (Romanian: [ˈurdə]), Macedonian urda (урда) and Bulgarian izvara (извара) are made by reprocessing the whey drained from any type of cheese. Urdă is thus similar to fresh ricotta as its fabrication implies the same technological process. However, Romanian urdă is neither smoked nor baked in the oven like some variants of the Italian ricotta. Urdă has been produced by Romanian shepherds for centuries and is consequently regarded by Romanians as a Romanian traditional product.

== See also ==
- List of Italian cheeses
- List of smoked foods
- Ricotta di fuscella
- Ricotta forte
- Hyblean ricotta
- Mozzarella
