= Brousse (cheese) =

French cheese

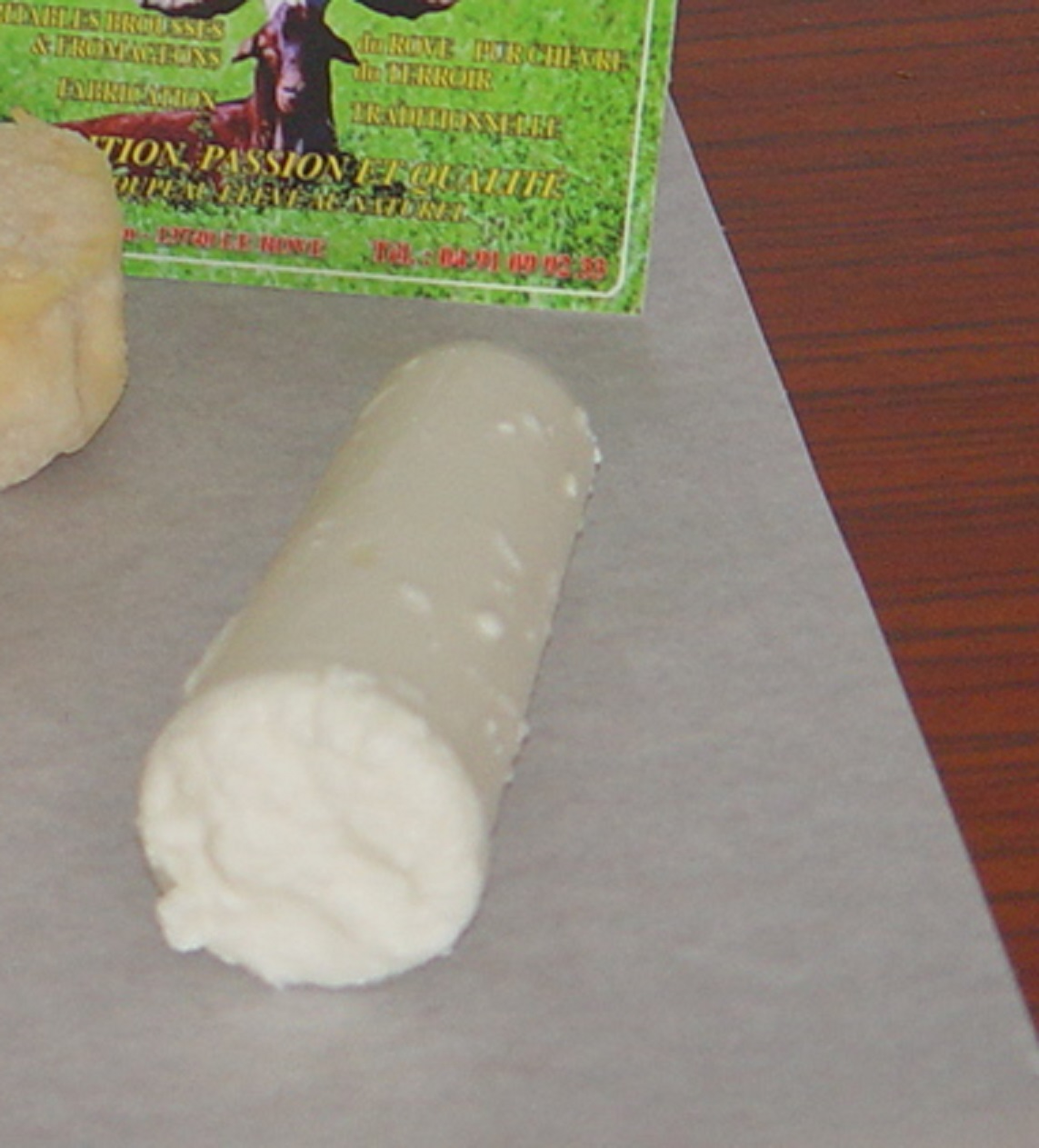
- Country of origin: France

Brousse (French, from Provençal brousso; corsican brócciu) is a white and lumpy whey cheese from Provence, and Corsica where it's named brocciu. It is mostly made of whey from cow, sheep or goat milk.

== Consumption ==
Brousse can be eaten as it is, or in savoury or sweet preparations. It can be seasoned with sugar, honey, jam, fines herbes or orange blossom, or dressed with red fruits coulis or maple syrup.

== See also ==
- List of Italian cheeses
- List of cheeses
