= Canestrelli =

Italian biscuit

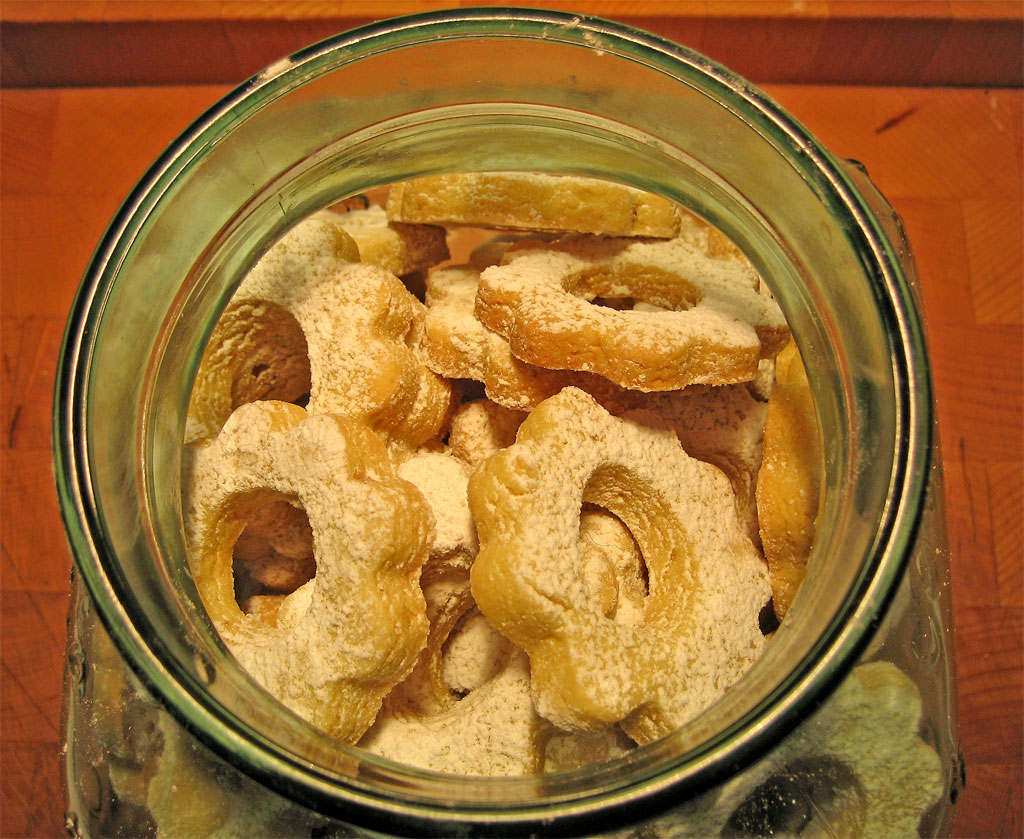
- A bowl of canestrelli biscuits
- Place of origin: Italy
- Region or state: Liguria; Piedmont
- Main ingredients: Semolina, confectioners' sugar

Canestrelli are a type of Italian biscuit. Originating in Montferrat, these biscuits are common in both Piedmont and Liguria. Moreover, under the name canistrelli, they are also typical of Corsica.

== See also ==
Media related to Canestrelli at Wikimedia Commons

- List of Italian desserts and pastries
- Cujuelle

== Bibliography ==
- Segan, Francine (2011). Dolci: Italy's Sweets. Abrams. ISBN 978-1613121887.
- Whitehouse, Rosie (2013). Liguria: The Italian Riviera. Bradt Travel Guides. ISBN 978-1841624730.
- Schapira, Christiane (1994). La bonne cuisine corse (in French). Paris: Solar. ISBN 2263001778.
