= Brocciu =

French ewe's milk cheese with whey

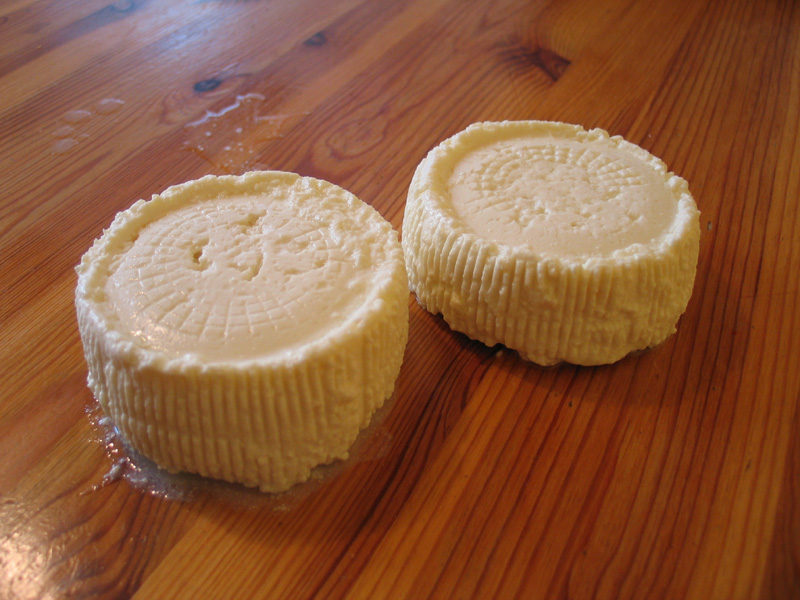
- Country of origin: France
- Region, town: Corsica
- Source of milk: Sheep/Goat
- Texture: Fresh/Soft
- Aging time: Max. 1 month, usually none
- Certification: French AOC 1983

Brocciu (French pronunciation: [bʁɔtʃiu]) is a Corsican cheese produced from a combination of milk and whey, giving it some of the characteristics of whey cheese. It is produced from ewe's milk. It is notable as a substitute for lactose-rich Italian ricotta, as brocciu contains less lactose.

Produced on the island of Corsica, brocciu is considered the island's most representative food. Like ricotta, it is a young white cheese and is paired frequently with Corsican white wines. It has been described as "the most famous cheese" in Corsica.

The word brocciu is related to the French word brousse and means fresh cheese made with goat or ewe's milk.

Brocciu is made from whey and milk. First, the whey is heated to a low temperature of just a few degrees below 100 °F (38 °C) and then ewe's milk is added and further heated to just a bit below 200 °F (93 °C). After heating, the cheese is drained in rush baskets.

The cheese is ready for consumption immediately, although it may be ripened for a few weeks (Corsican: brocciu passu or brocciu vechju); the ideal affinage time for brocciu is 48 hours to one month.

In Corsican cuisine, it is used in the preparation of innumerable dishes, from first courses to desserts.

== See also ==
- List of cheeses
