= Easter food =

Food associated with Easter holiday

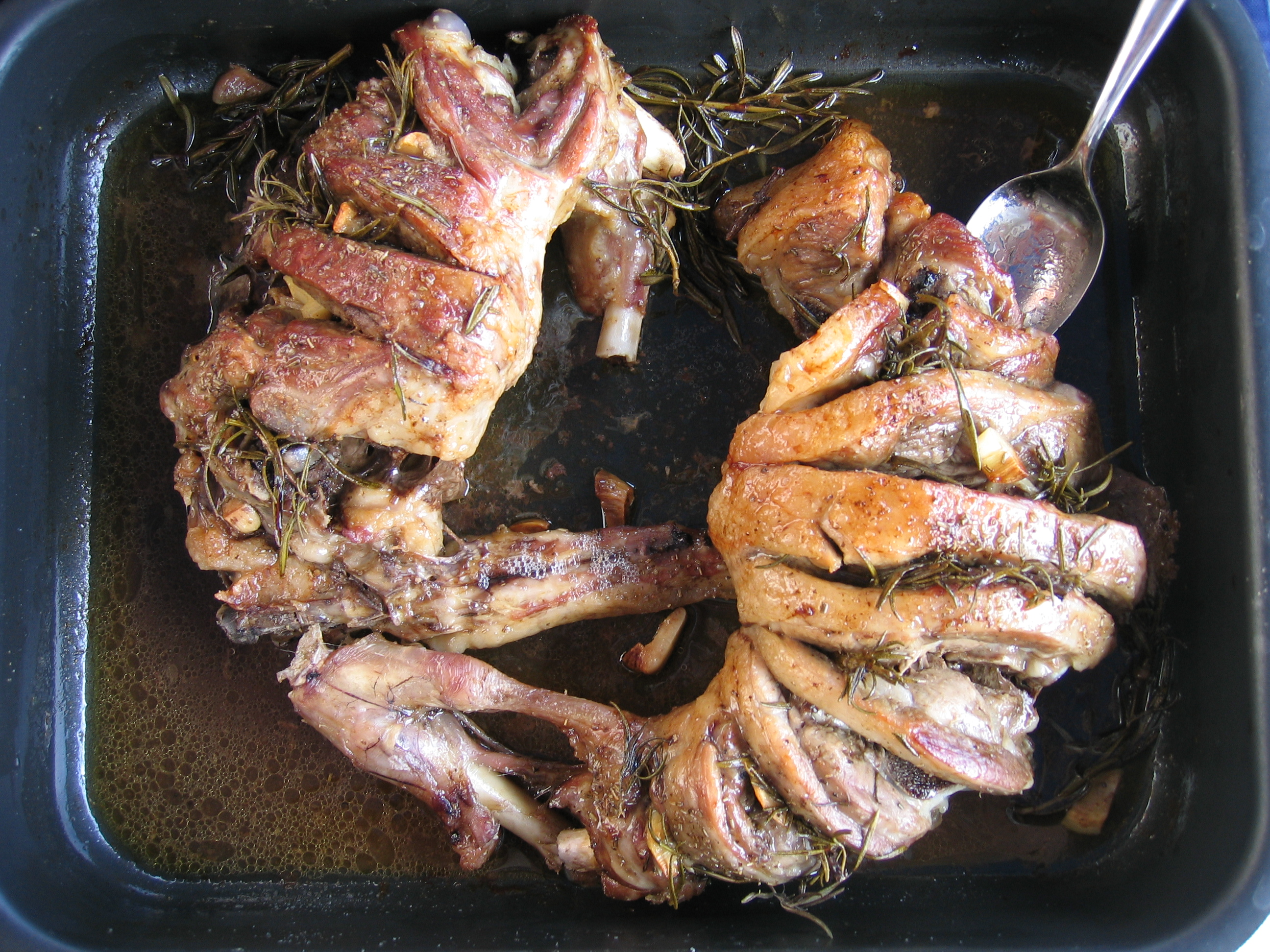
Abbacchio, a lamb preparation from the Italian Easter tradition

The holiday of Easter is associated with various Easter customs and foodways (food traditions that vary regionally). Preparing, coloring, and decorating Easter eggs is one such popular tradition. Lamb is eaten in many countries, mirroring the Jewish Passover meal.

Eating lamb at Easter has a religious meaning. The Paschal Lamb of the New Testament is in fact, for Christianity, the son of God Jesus Christ. The Paschal Lamb, in particular, represents the sacrifice of Jesus Christ for the sins of humanity. Eating lamb at Easter therefore commemorates the Death and Resurrection of Jesus.

== Easter eggs ==
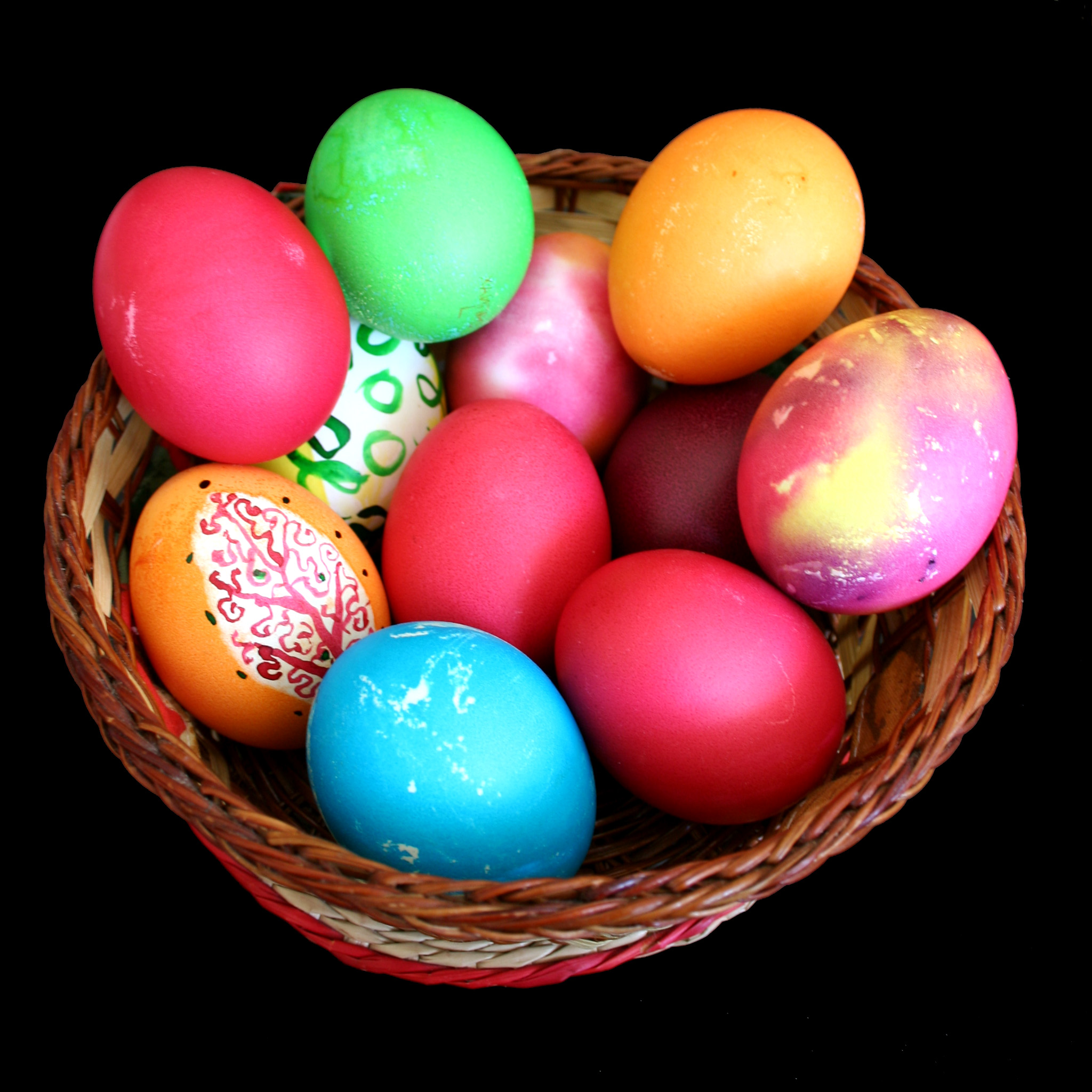
Decorated Easter eggs

Easter eggs, also called Paschal eggs, are eggs that are decorated for the Christian feast of Easter, which celebrates the resurrection of Jesus. As such, Easter eggs are common during the season of Eastertide (Easter season). The oldest tradition, which continues to be used in Central and Eastern Europe, is to use dye and paint chicken eggs.

Although eggs, in general, were a traditional symbol of fertility and rebirth, in Christianity, for the celebration of Eastertide, Easter eggs symbolize the empty tomb of Jesus, from which Jesus was resurrected. In addition, one ancient tradition was the staining of Easter eggs with the colour red "in memory of the blood of Christ, shed as at that time of his crucifixion."

This custom of the Easter egg, according to many sources, can be traced to early Christians of Mesopotamia, and from there it spread into Eastern Europe and Siberia through the Orthodox Churches, and later into Europe through the Catholic and Protestant Churches. Additionally, the widespread usage of Easter eggs, according to mediaevalist scholars, is due to the prohibition of eggs during Lent after which, on Easter, they have been blessed for the occasion.

A modern custom in some places is to substitute chocolate eggs wrapped in coloured foil, hand-carved wooden eggs, or plastic eggs filled with confectionery such as chocolate.

== By country ==
=== English-speaking world ===
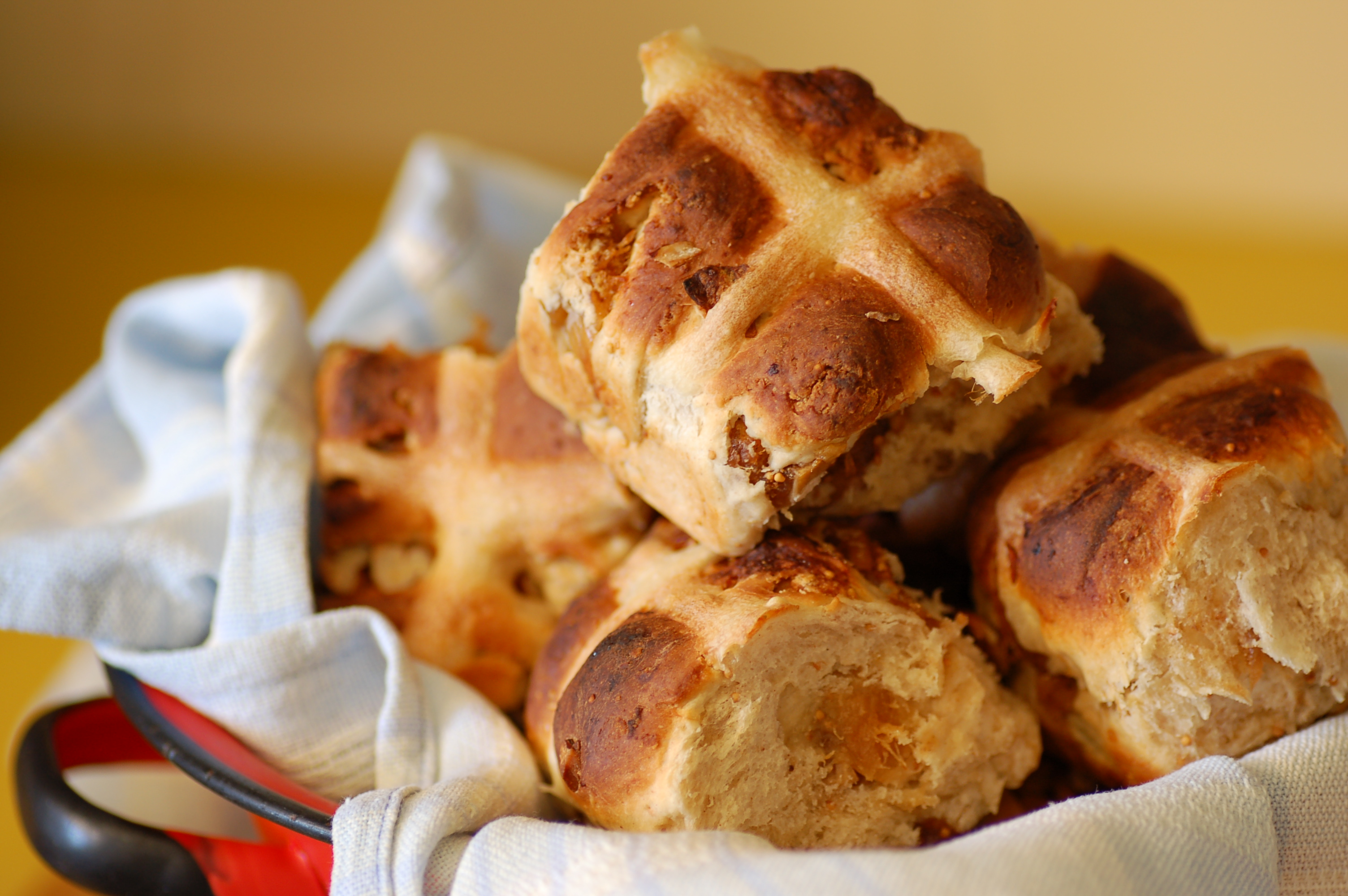
Hot cross bun

A hot cross bun is a spiced bun usually made with fruit, marked with a cross on the top, which has been traditionally eaten on Good Friday in the United Kingdom, Australia, New Zealand, South Africa, Canada, India, Pakistan, Malta, United States and the Commonwealth Caribbean. They are available all year round in some places, including the UK. The bun marks the end of the Christian season of Lent and different parts of the hot cross bun have a certain meaning, including the cross representing the crucifixion of Jesus, the spices inside signifying the spices used to embalm him at his burial and sometimes also orange peel to reflect the bitterness of his time on the cross. The Greeks in the 6th century AD may have marked cakes with a cross. In the Christian tradition, the making of buns with a cross on them and consuming them after breaking the fast on Good Friday, along with "crying about 'Hot cross buns'", is done in order to commemorate the crucifixion of Jesus. It is hypothesised that the contemporary hot cross bun of Christianity originates from St Albans in England, where in 1361, Brother Thomas Rodcliffe, a 14th-century Christian monk at St Albans Abbey, developed a similar recipe called an 'Alban Bun' and distributed the bun to the poor on Good Friday.

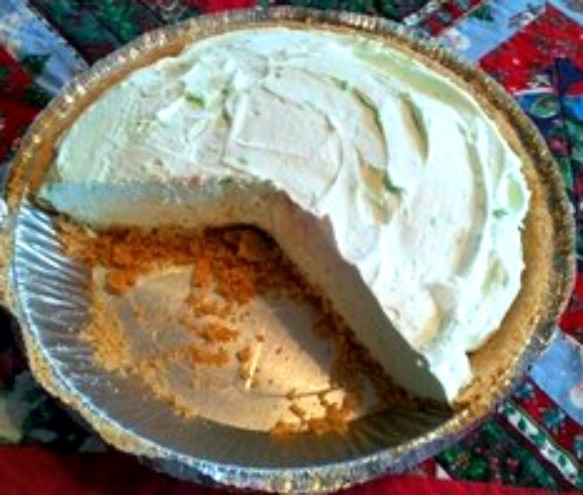
Grasshopper pie

Grasshopper pie is a no-bake mint-flavored mousse pie with a chocolate crumb crust. Typically light green in color, it is associated with spring, and especially with Easter celebrations in the United States. The pie takes its name from the Grasshopper cocktail. Grasshopper pie filling is made by folding whipped cream into marshmallow or cream cheese. The cream cheese version is made by adding green food coloring to a mixture of condensed milk with cream cheese, then gently folding in chocolate-covered mint cookie crumbs and whipped topping. Alternately, melted marshmallows can be gently folded into fresh whipped cream. The filling is infused with creme de menthe and creme de cacao, which give the mousse its characteristic green coloring. The crust is a chocolate cookie crumb crust, variations of which can be made with crumbled sandwich cookies, or by melting chocolate in a double boiler and stirring in crisped rice cereal, then pressing the mixture into a pie dish and allowing it to set in the refrigerator.

Easter was traditionally the most important date in the Christian calendar in Ireland, with a large feast marking the end of lent on Easter Sunday. Among the food commonly eaten were lamb, veal, and chicken, with a meal of corned beef, cabbage, and floury potatoes was a popular meal. It was traditional for farmers to share the meat from a slaughtered bullock or lamb with neighbours and or the less fortunate. Another tradition was that if a beggar called to a house, they would be given roasted potatoes. At this time of year, eggs were plentiful, and would be eaten at each meal.

=== Nordic countries ===
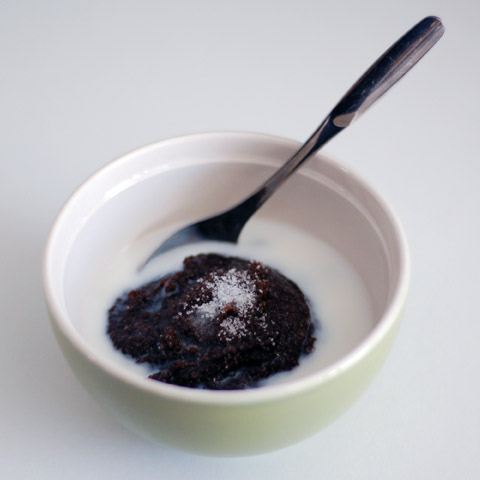
Mämmi

For lunch or dinner on Holy Saturday, families in Sweden and Denmark traditionally feast on a smörgåsbord of herring, salmon, potatoes, eggs, and other kinds of food. In Finland, it is common to eat roasted lamb with potatoes and other vegetables. In Finland, the Lutheran majority enjoys mämmi as another traditional Easter treat, while the Orthodox minority's traditions include eating pasha (also spelled paskha) instead.

=== Germany ===
In Germany, during the weeks before Easter, special Easter bread is sold (in German: Osterbrot). This is made with yeast dough, raisins, and almond splinters. Usually, it is cut in slices and spread with butter. People enjoy it either for breakfast or for tea time (in German: Kaffee und Kuchen, literally ″coffee and cake″).

=== Greece ===
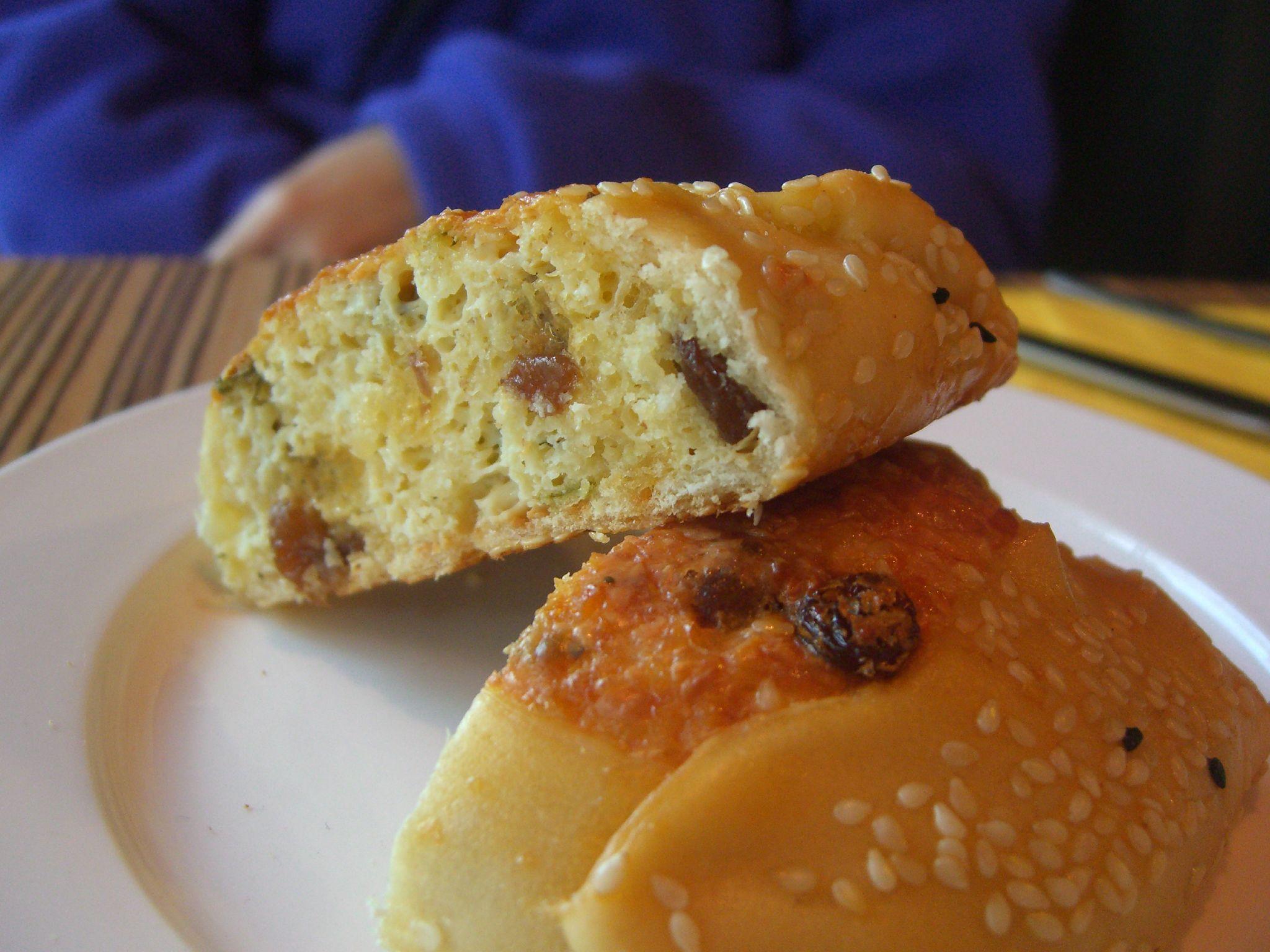
Flaouna

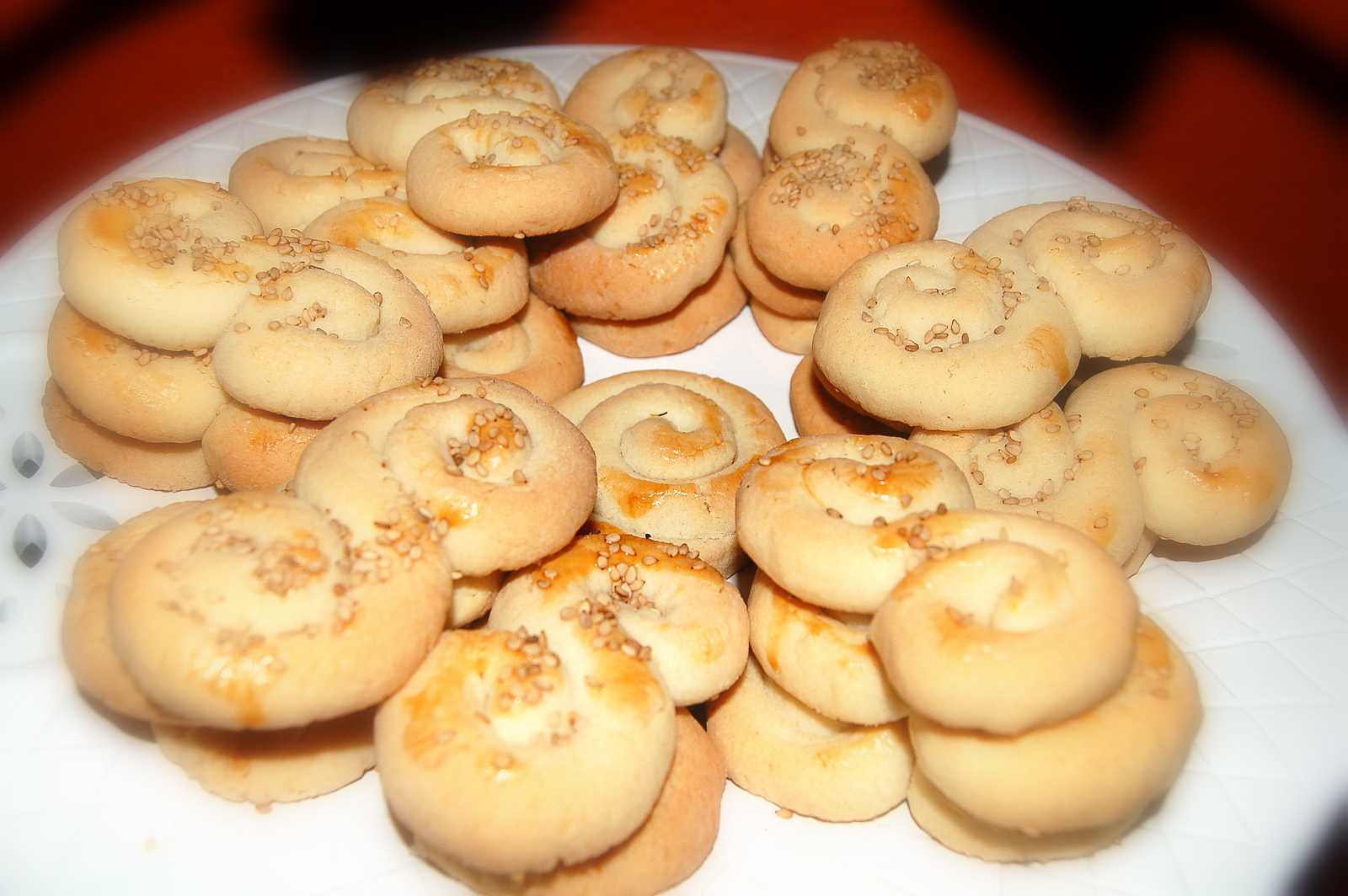
Koulourakia

In Greece, the traditional Easter meal is mageiritsa, a hearty stew of chopped lamb liver and wild greens seasoned with egg-and-lemon sauce. Traditionally, Easter eggs, hard-boiled eggs dyed bright red to symbolize the spilt Blood of Christ and the promise of eternal life, are cracked together to celebrate the opening of the Tomb of Christ. Greek foods of the Easter tradition are Flaouna, Lazarakia, Koulourakia, Magiritsa and Tsoureki.

Flaouna is a cheese-filled pastry from Cyprus and Greece, which may include raisins or be garnished with sesame seeds. Flaounes are traditionally prepared for Easter. Regional names for flaouna include vlaouna, fesoudki (Greek: φεσούδκι) in Karavas, and aflaouna in Karpasia. Flaounes are traditionally served in Cyprus, parts of Greece (especially Arcadia) and more widely in the Greek diaspora as a celebratory food for the breaking of the Lenten fast, being prepared on Great and Holy Friday for consumption on Easter Sunday. They are eaten in place of bread on Easter Sunday, and continue to be made and eaten for the weeks following. Creating the flaounes can often be a family tradition shared with multiple generations.

Koulourakia or Koulouria, are a traditional Greek dessert, typically made around Easter to be eaten after Holy Saturday. They are a butter-based pastry, traditionally hand-shaped, with egg glaze on top. They have a sweet delicate flavor with a hint of vanilla. Koulourakia are well known for their sprinkle of sesame seeds and distinctive ring shape. The pastries can be shaped into braided circles, hairpin twists, figure eights, twisted wreaths, horseshoes or Greek letters, although they are still often shaped into a snake style. Often, a clove is added atop the center of the pastry for added flavor. They are commonly eaten with morning coffee or afternoon tea. Like all pastries, they are normally kept in dry conditions in a jar with a lockable lid. Koulourakia have been prepared since at least the time of the Minoan civilization.

=== Hungary ===
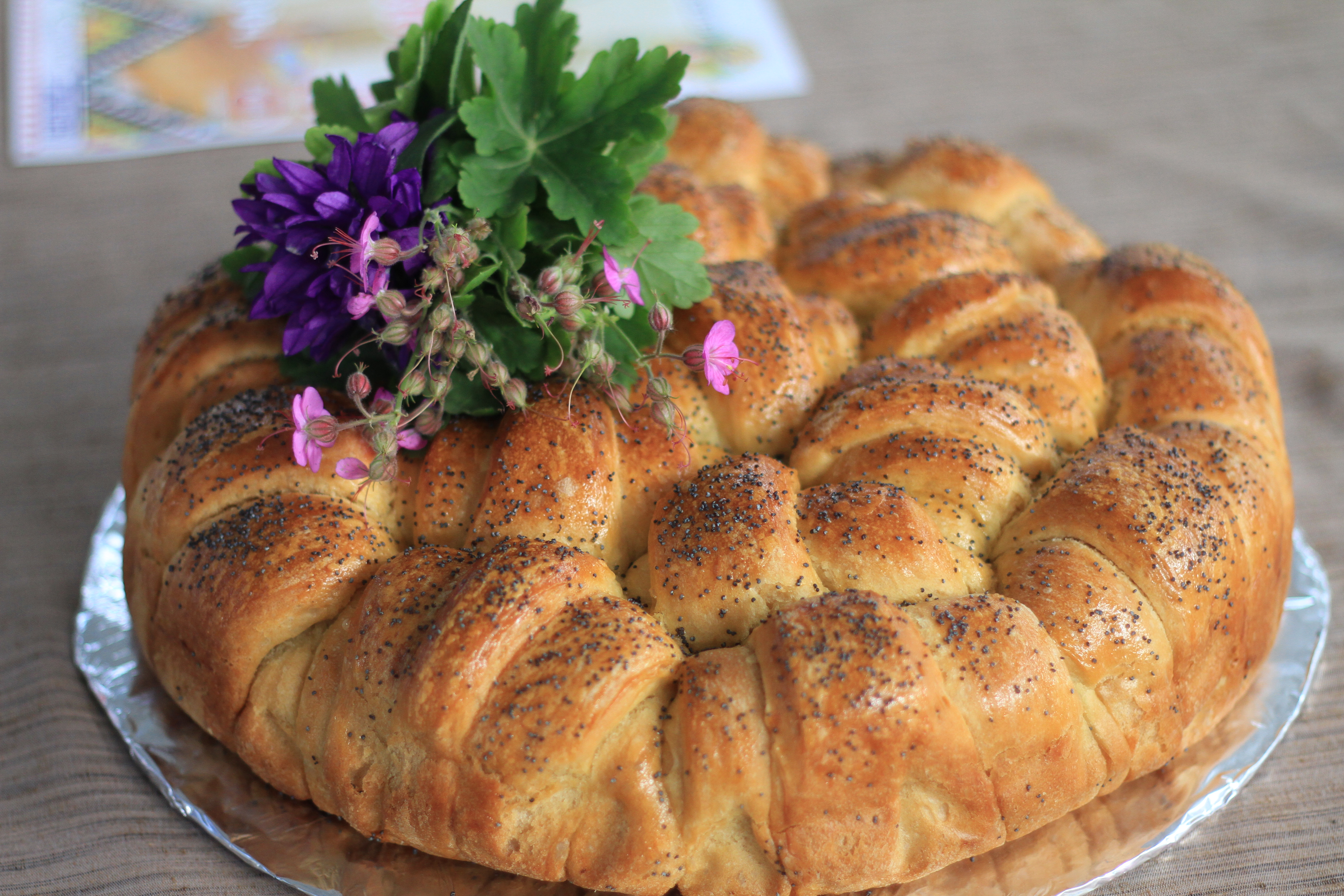
Pogača

In the Eastern part of Hungary, an Easter specialty known as sárgatúró (lit. '"yellow curd cheese"') is made for the occasion. Sárgatúró is a delicacy, prepared mostly in Eastern Catholic regions, notably in Szabolcs-Szatmár-Bereg County and in the Hajdúság. It is made by combining milk, eggs and sugar and boiling the mixture, stirring often, until it begins to lump, much like curd cheese or quark. Vanilla flavor is then added. When the lumps have formed, the mixture is put into a strong cloth and squeezed to get extra moisture out. The top of the cloth is then tied with a ribbon and the sárgatúró hung outside to let it drip and stick together. It is served cold, with other Easter foods like ham, kalács and boiled eggs. Besides the basic recipe, family recipes may vary, adding raisins, and/or cinnamon or nutmeg as additional spices. Pogača is a type of bread baked in the ashes of the fireplace, and later in modern ovens. Found in the cuisines of the Balkans and Hungary it can be leavened or unleavened, though the latter is considered more challenging to make.

=== Italy ===
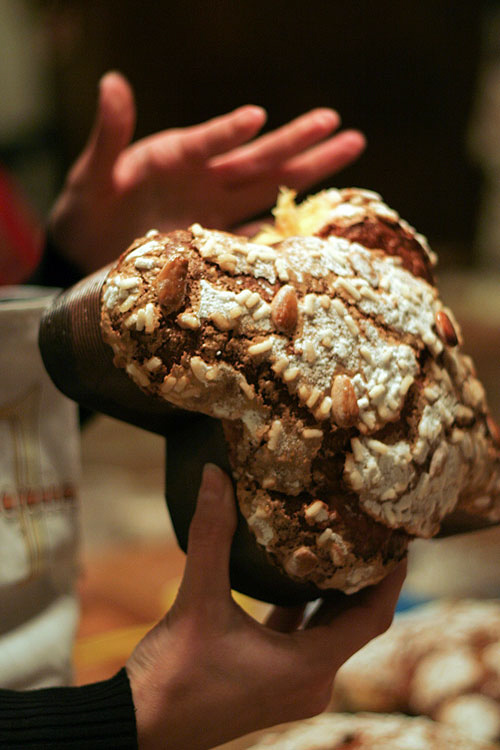
Italian Easter bread, the Colomba di Pasqua. It is the Easter counterpart of the two well-known Italian Christmas desserts, panettone and pandoro

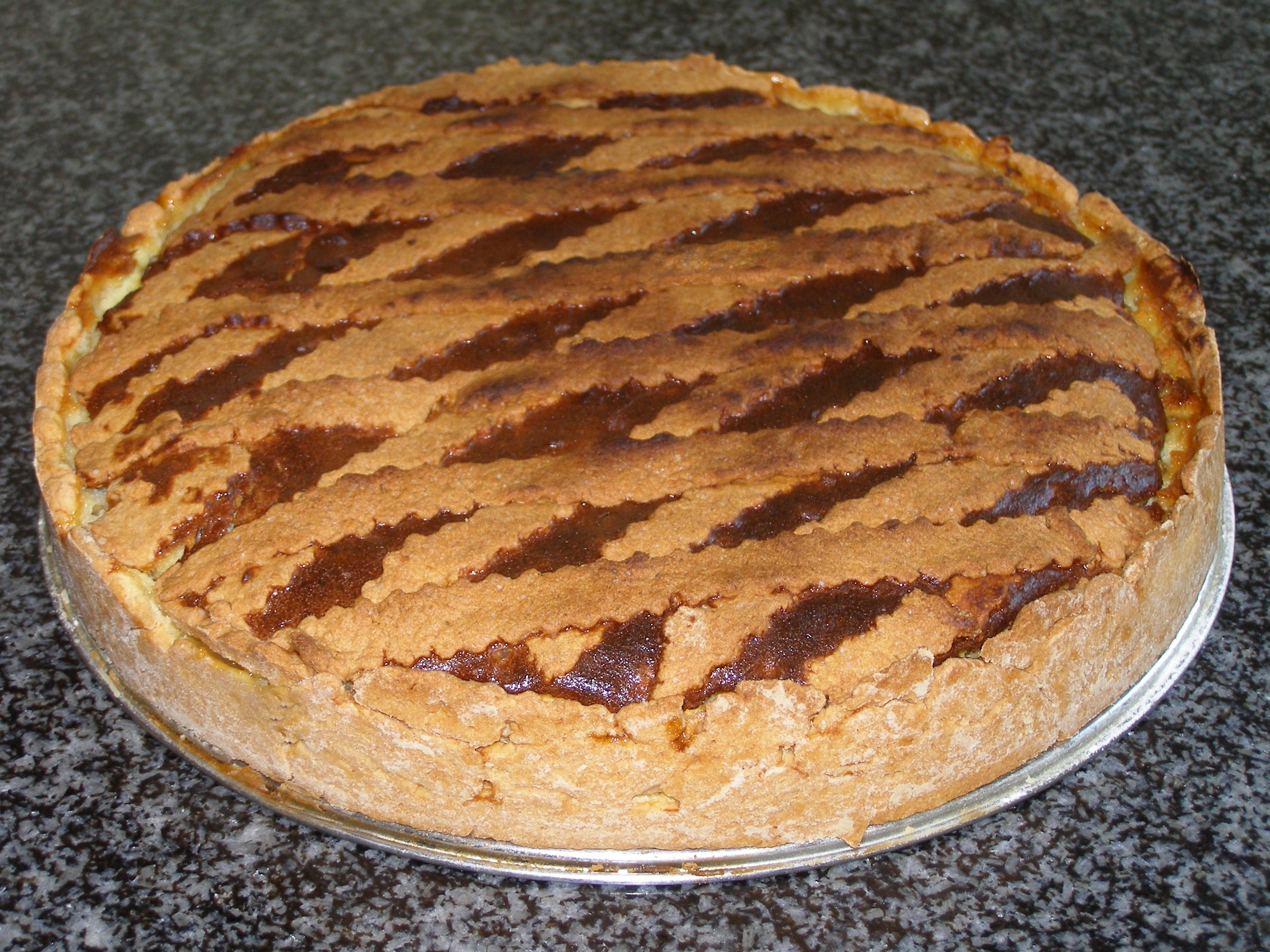
Pastiera

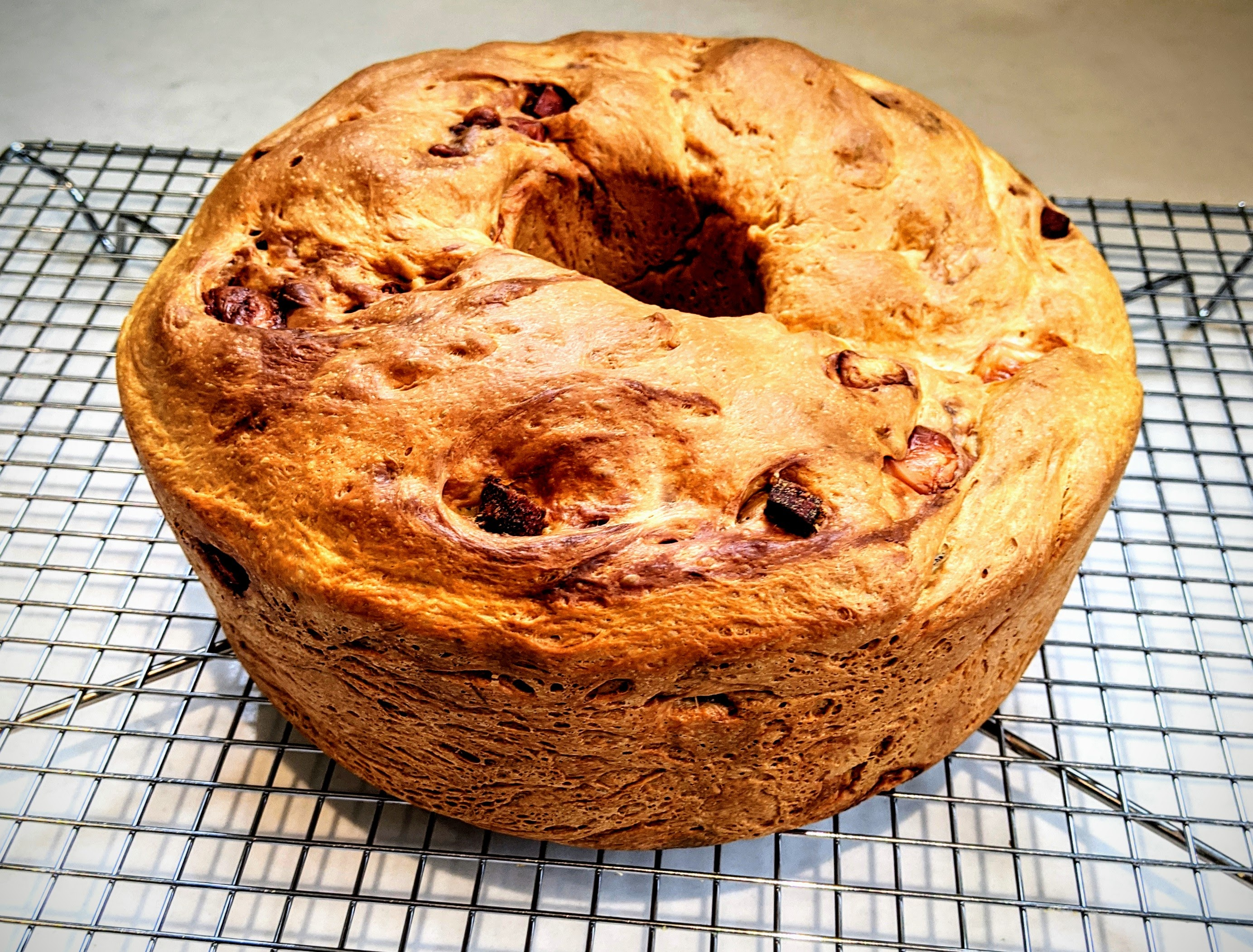
Casatiello

Easter in Italy (Italian: Pasqua) is one of the country's major holidays. Traditional Italian dishes for the Easter period are abbacchio, cappello del prete, casatiello, Colomba di Pasqua, pastiera, penia, pizza di Pasqua and pizzelle.

Abbacchio is an Italian preparation of lamb typical of the Roman cuisine. It is a product protected by the European Union with the PGI mark. In Romanesco dialect, the offspring of the sheep who is still suckling or recently weaned is called abbacchio, while the offspring of the sheep almost a year old who has already been shorn twice is called agnello ("lamb"). This distinction exists only in the Romanesco dialect. In Italy at Easter, abbacchio is cooked in different ways, with recipes that vary from region to region. In Rome it is roasted, in Apulia in the oven, in Naples it is cooked with peas and eggs, in Sardinia it is cooked in the oven with potatoes, artichokes and myrtle, and in Tuscany it is cooked in cacciatore style. Other local preparations include frying and stewing.

Casatiello (Neapolitan: casatiéllo, Italian: casatello) is a leavened savory bread originating from Naples prepared during the Easter period. Its basic ingredients are flour, lard, cheese, salami, cracklings, eggs and black pepper. The bread's name derives probably from the Neapolitan word caso (Italian: cacio, "cheese", hence casatiello), an ingredient that is part of its dough.

Colomba di Pasqua (English: "Easter Dove") is an Italian traditional Easter bread, the Easter counterpart of the two well-known Italian Christmas desserts, panettone and pandoro. The dough for the colomba is made in a similar manner to panettone, with flour, eggs, sugar, natural yeast and butter; unlike panettone, it usually contains candied peel and no raisins. The dough is then fashioned into a dove shape (colomba in Italian) and finally is topped with pearl sugar and almonds before being baked. Some manufacturers produce other versions including a popular bread topped with chocolate. The colomba was commercialised by the Milanese baker and businessman Angelo Motta as an Easter version of the Christmas speciality panettone that Motta foods were producing.

Pastiera is a type of Neapolitan tart made with cooked wheat, eggs, ricotta cheese, and flavoured with orange flower water. It is usually eaten at Easter. Various writers repeat legends about the origin of pastiera. One story connects it to the siren Parthenope, whom the Neapolitans thanked for her sweet singing by giving her ricotta, flour, eggs, milk, spices, and sugar; Parthenope gave these ingredients to the gods, who made pastiera out of it. Another story connects it to a spring celebration of the goddess Ceres.

The pizza di Pasqua ("Easter pizza" in English), in some areas also called crescia di Pasqua, torta di Pasqua, torta al formaggio or crescia brusca, is a leavened savory cake typical of many areas of central Italy based on wheat flour, eggs, pecorino and parmesan. Traditionally served at breakfast on Easter morning, or as an appetizer during Easter lunch, it is accompanied by blessed boiled eggs, ciauscolo and red wine or, again, served at the Easter Monday picnic. Having the same shape as panettone, the pizza di Pasqua with cheese is a typical product of the Marche region, but also Umbrian (where, as a traditional food product, it obtained the P.A.T. recognition). There is also a sweet variant. The peculiarity of this product is its shape, given by the particular mold in which it is leavened and then baked in the oven; originally in earthenware, today in aluminum, it has a flared shape. The name pizza is here to be understood not in the recent meaning that has spread into Italian through the Neapolitan language, but in the original medieval Latin meaning of 'focaccia', thus suggesting an ancient origin of the dish.

=== Jamaica ===
In Jamaica, eating bun and cheese is a highly anticipated custom by Jamaican nationals all over the world. The Jamaica Easter Buns are spiced and have raisins, and baked in a loaf tin. The buns are sliced and eaten with a slice of cheese. It is a common practice for employers to make gifts of bun and cheese or a single loaf of bun to staff members. According to the Jamaica Gleaner, "The basic Easter bun recipe requires wheat flour, brown sugar, molasses, baking powder or yeast and dried fruits."

=== Mexico ===
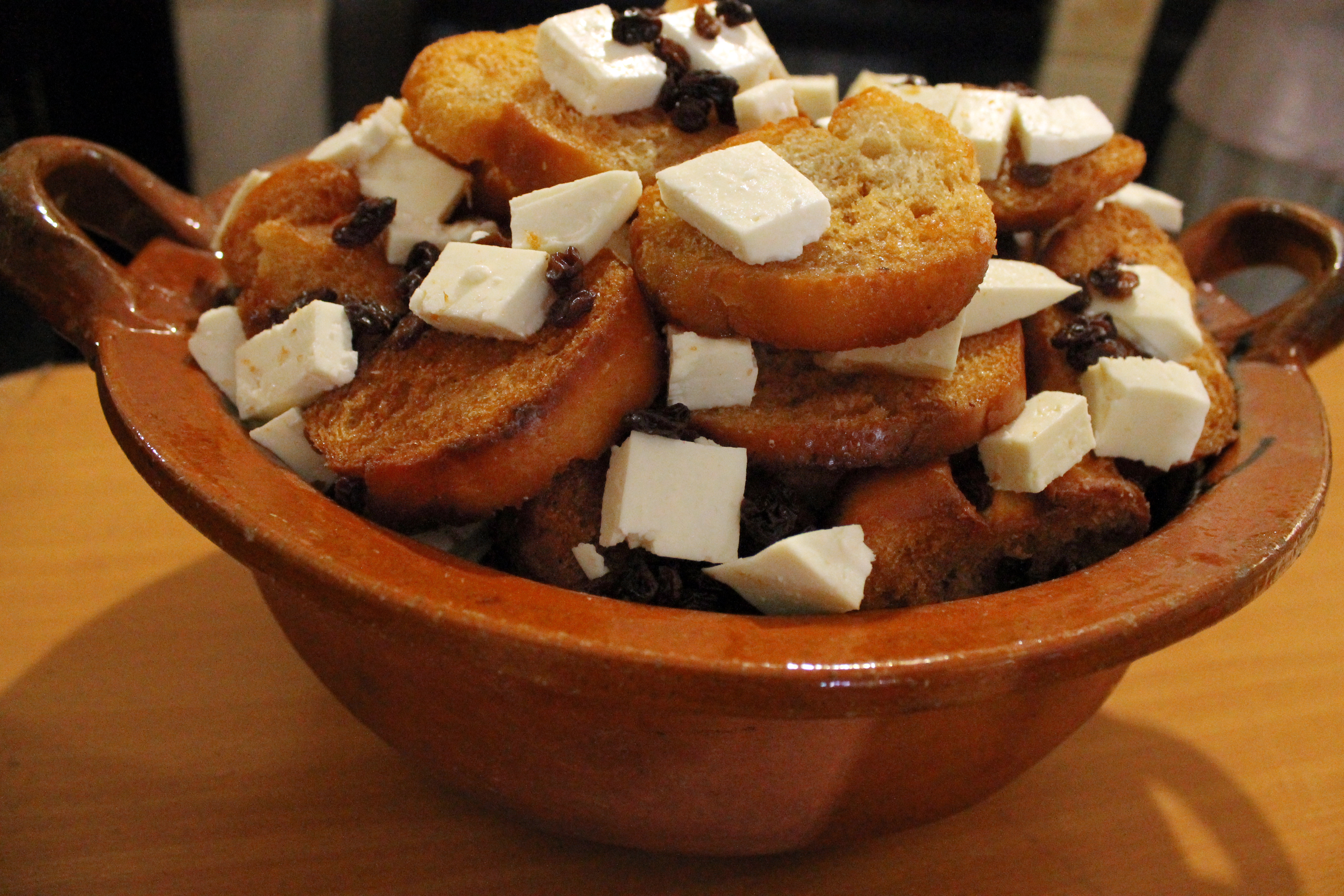
Capirotada

Capirotada or Capilotade, also known as Capirotada de vigilia, is a traditional Mexican food similar to a bread pudding that is usually eaten during the Lenten period. It is one of the dishes served on Good Friday. Despite originally being consumed before Lent, capirotada is now consumed during Lent, especially during Holy Week and on Good Friday. Recently, it has been given a spiritual meaning in relation to the passion of Christ and the Lenten season, thus, for many people, the bread represents the Body of Christ, the syrup is his blood, the cloves are the nails of the cross, and the whole cinnamon sticks are the wood of the cross. The melted cheese stands for the Holy Shroud.

A cascarón is a hollowed-out chicken egg filled with confetti or small toys. Cascarones are common throughout Mexico and are similar to the Easter eggs popular in many other countries. They are mostly used in Mexico during Carnival, but in American and Mexican border towns, the cultures combined to make them a popular Easter tradition. Decorated, confetti-filled cascarones may be thrown or crushed over the recipient's head to shower them with confetti. This originated in Spain. When a child would act up, their father would crack an egg over their head as a consequence, and a way of showing their disappointment in them. In addition to Easter, cascarones have become popular for occasions including birthdays, New Year's, Halloween, Cinco de Mayo, Dieciséis, Day of the Dead, and weddings. Wedding cascarones can be filled with rice. Like many popular traditions in Mexico, cascarones are increasingly popular in the southwestern United States. For example, they are especially prominent during the two-week, citywide festival of Fiesta in San Antonio, Texas. Cascarones are usually made during Easter time.

=== Poland ===
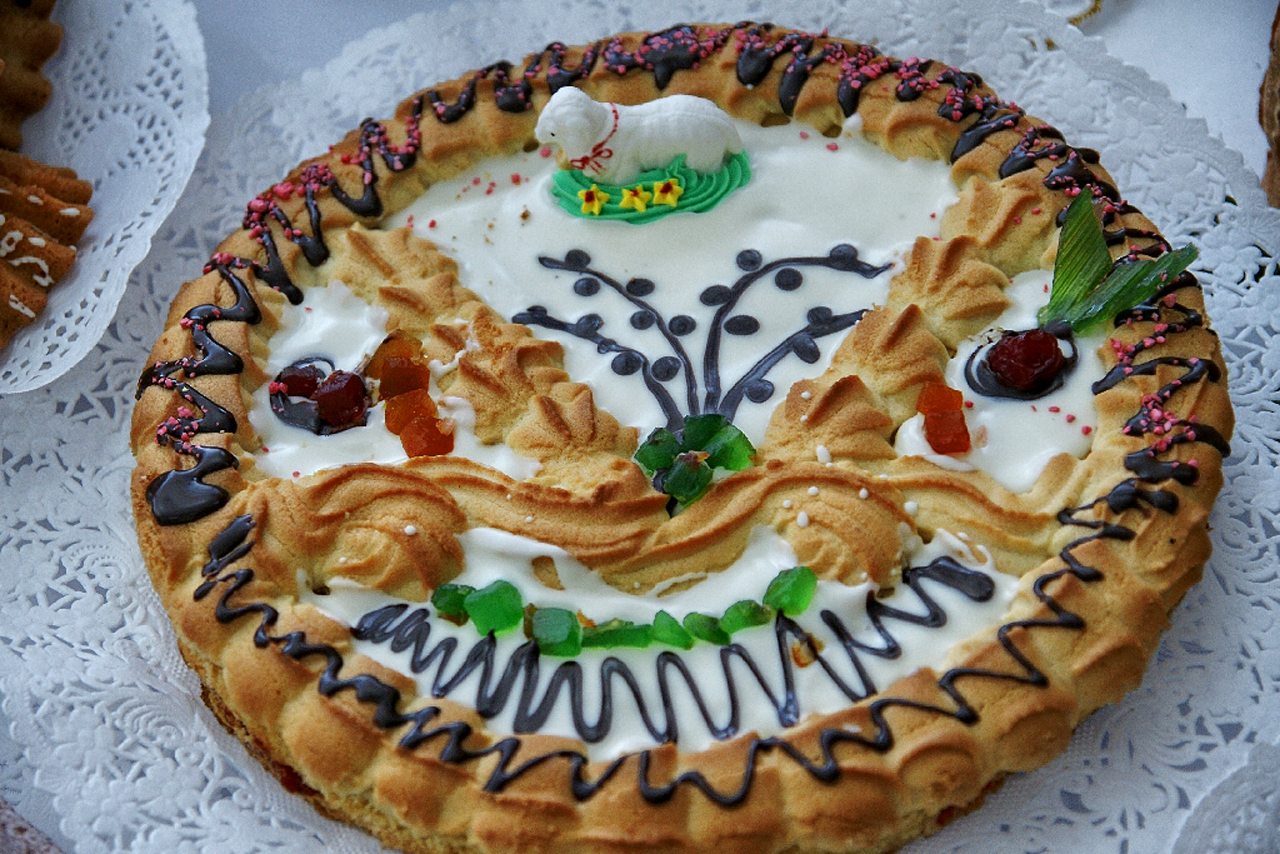
Mazurek

Easter in Poland, a public holiday, is one of that country's major holidays, often compared in importance to Christmas. Associated with it are many specific customs and traditions. In Poland, white sausage and mazurek are typical Easter breakfast dishes. The butter lamb (Baranek wielkanocny) is a traditional addition to the Easter meal for many Polish Catholics. Butter is shaped into a lamb either by hand or in a lamb-shaped mold. Mazurek is a variety of cake with a flat shape. It is very sweet. According to Polish gastronomy coursebooks, typical mazurek is a cake that can be made of one or two sheets of short (or half-short) pastry or one sheet of short (or half-short) pastry covered with a sheet of butter sponge cake. The two sheets are fixed together with a help of a layer of marmalade. In case of one-sheet version, marmalade is skipped or goes on top, under the layer of icing. The top of mazurek is covered with a layer of icing (i.e. sugar icing or kajmak) or jelly. It is also decorated with nut-based icing or almond-based icing and candied fruits. Traditionally, home-baked mazurek cakes are often decorated with dried fruits and nuts.

=== Portugal ===
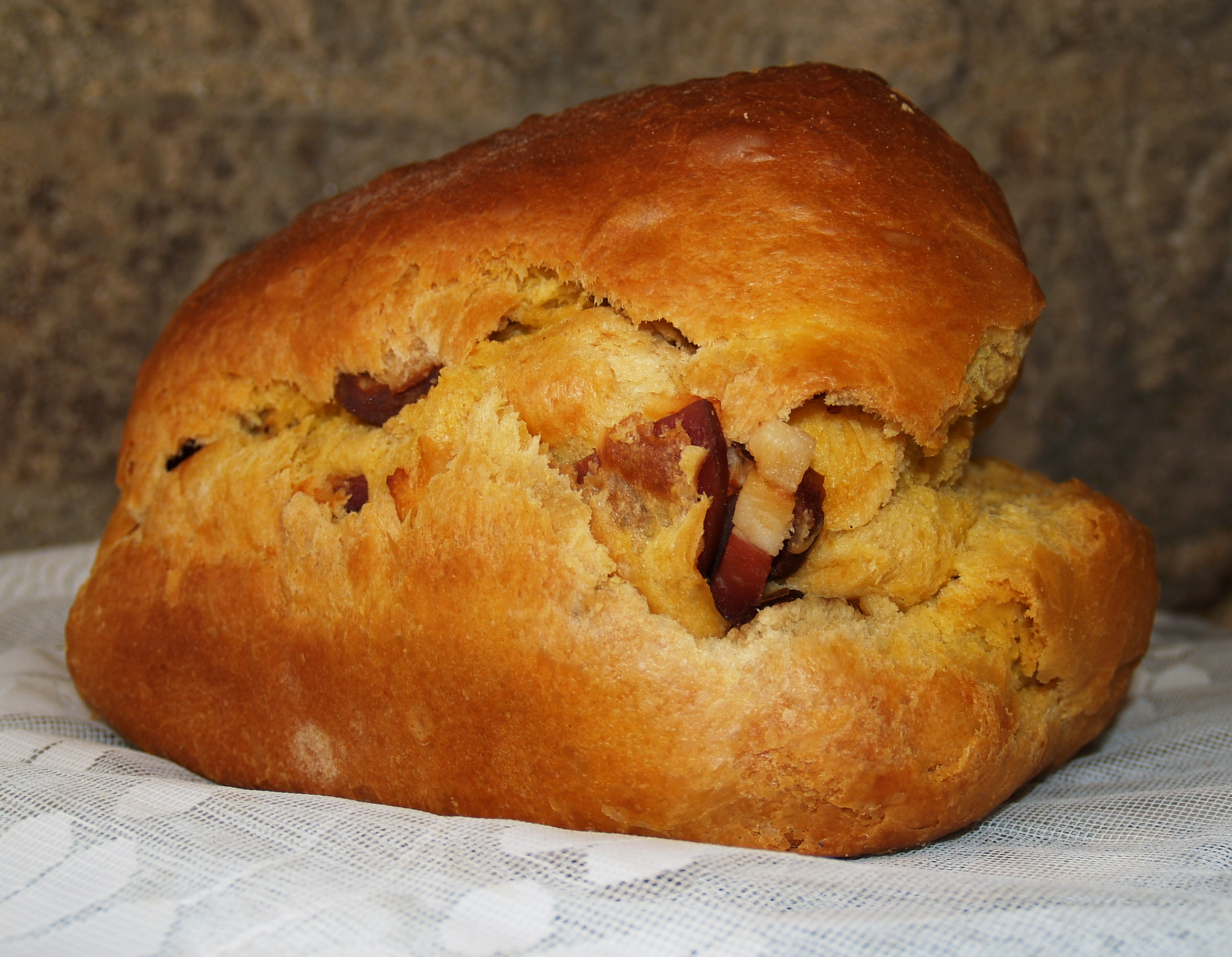
Folar

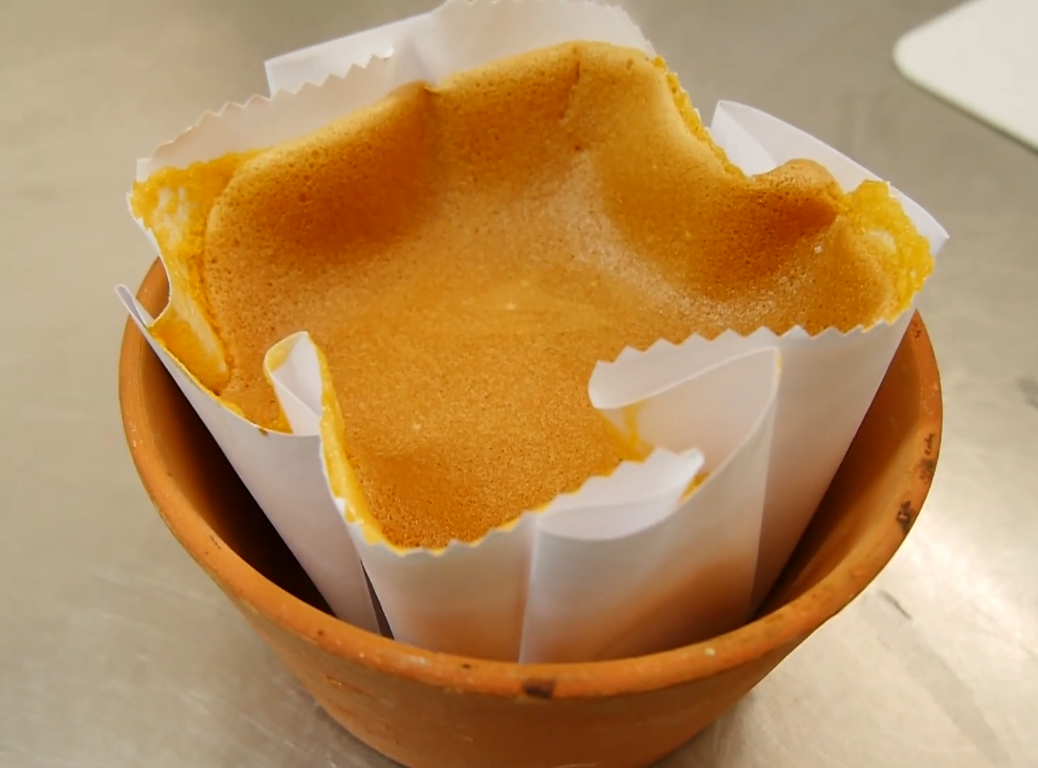
Pão de Ló

Folar or folar de Páscoa is a traditional Portuguese bread served at Easter. The recipe varies from region to region and it may be sweet or savory. During Easter festivities, godchildren usually bring a bouquet of violets to their godmother on Palm Sunday and this, on Easter Sunday, offers him a folar. Folar is sometimes served with a boiled egg, that symbolically represents rebirth and the Resurrection. Folar de Chaves, popular in the north-eastern Portuguese regions of Chaves and Valpaços, is stuffed with pork, ham, salpicão and linguiça. There are also sweet folar like the folar from Olhão, that consists of seven layers with melted sugar and cinnamon, and the more common folar with anise and cinnamon.

Pão de Ló is a Portuguese sponge cake made of eggs, sugar, and wheat flour. Unlike other cakes or breads, yeast or baking powder is generally not used. Rather, to provide volume, air is suspended into the cake batter during mixing. The first record of pão de ló, written as "pãoo de llo", was indicated in the manuscripts of Infanta Maria of Portugal in the mid-1500s. Unlike the pão de ló seen today, it was a thick pudding made solely with ground almonds instead of wheat flour.

Portuguese sweet bread refers to an enriched sweet bread or yeasted cake originating from Portugal. Historically, these sweet breads were generally reserved for festive occasions such as Easter or Pentecost and were typically given as gifts. However, in contemporary times, many varieties are made and consumed year round. Outside of Portugal, Portuguese "sweet bread" transliterated as "pão doce" is often associated with Azorean "massa sovada" which are similar but traditionally prepared differently. Many traditional Portuguese sweet breads are defined by the associated region or by the convents, artisan bakers or religious confraternities (similar to a guild) that historically made them. Since many have deep historical and cultural significance to the area which they originate from, these breads are as well as other foods and ingredients are inventoried by the Portuguese governmental office Directorate-General for Agriculture and Rural Development (DGARD), which collaborates with a collective of independent confraternities known as the Portuguese Federation of Gastronomic Confraternities (FPCG) throughout Portugal.

=== Spain ===
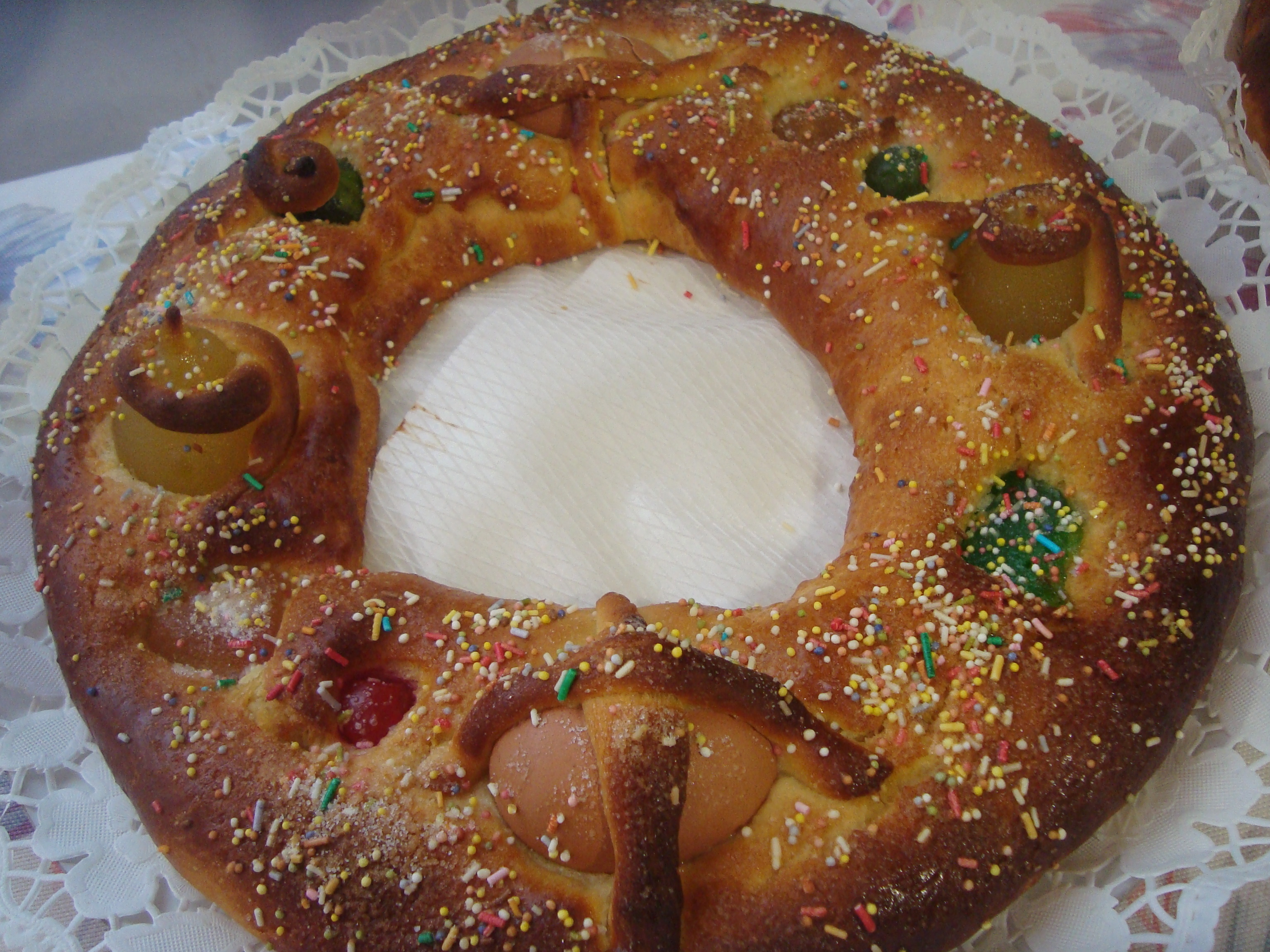
Easter mona

The Easter mona is a Spanish kind of cake that is especially eaten on Easter Sunday or Easter Monday in the Spanish regions of Catalonia, Valencia and Murcia. In other Spanish regions, these Easter cakes are common with variations in the recipe and name. According to the writing of Joan Amades, mentions of the mona date back to the 15th century, though in the Joan Lacavalleria's 1696 dictionary, Gazophylacium Catalano-Latinum, mona still has a purely zoological definition (meaning female monkey). The 1783 edition of the dictionary of the Royal Spanish Academy has the following definition: "Catalonia, Valencia and Murcia. Cake baked with eggs in their shell at Easter, known in other parts of the Iberian Peninsula as Hornazo".

Marañuela is a typical sweet from Asturias, Spain, made mainly by flour, sugar, eggs, clarified butter and lemon zest. Its origin is somewhat uncertain, although the closest history links it to the seafaring world. During Holy Week the boats used to return to port and stock up on them before leaving again. That is why traditionally they continue to be made on this time of the year. They are typical of coastal villages Candás y Luanco, although the elaboration in this two places is slightly different. Even though they can be made all year round, they are usually made on Resurrection Sunday and offered among family members, mainly among godparents and godchildren.

=== Eastern-slavic cultures ===
Preparations for Easter celebration in Ukraine begin weeks before the feast day, with Great Lent being part of it. The Ukrainian Easter eggs include pysanky, krashanky (edible, one-colour dyed eggs), driapanky (a design is scratched on the eggshell) etc. During the Easter Vigil a priest also blesses the parishioners' Easter baskets, which include Easter eggs, paska, butter, cheese, kovbasa, salt and a few other products. With this food, on their return home, people break their fast.

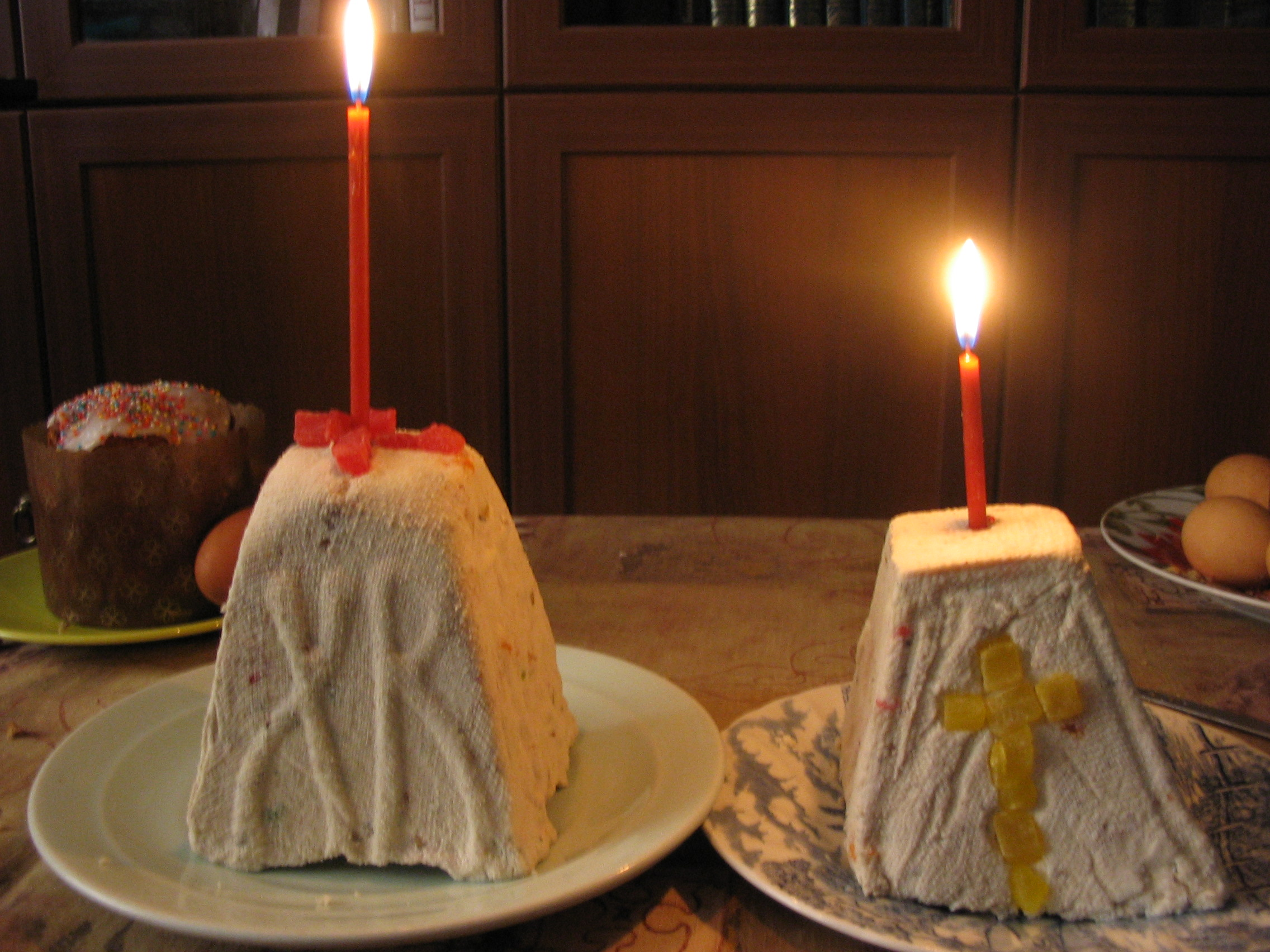
Two paskhas with candles (with a kulich and Easter eggs in the background)

Paskha (also spelled pascha, or pasha) is a Slavic festive dish made in Eastern Orthodox countries which consists of food that is forbidden during the fast of Great Lent. It is made during Holy Week and then brought to Church on Great Saturday to be blessed after the Paschal Vigil. The name of the dish comes from Pascha, the Eastern Orthodox celebration of Easter. Besides Russia, Ukraine, etc. Pasha is also often served in Finland. Cheese paskha is a traditional Easter dish made from tvorog (like cottage cheese, Russian: творог, romanized: tvorog), which is white, symbolizing the purity of Christ, the Paschal Lamb, and the joy of the Resurrection. It is formed in a mold, traditionally in the shape of a truncated pyramid which symbolizes the first Passover in Egypt, a nod to Christianity's early Jewish beginnings and a reminder that the Last Supper of Jesus was a Passover Seder. Others believe the pyramid is a symbol of the Trinity, the Church; Tomb of Christ). It is usually served as an accompaniment to rich Easter breads called paska in Ukraine and kulich in Russia (where the "paskha" name is also used in the Southern regions) and Poland "Pascha". The Easter foods; bread and cheese paska are very rich and made of many dairy items given up during Great Lent. They are brought to church on Easter to be blessed by the priest.

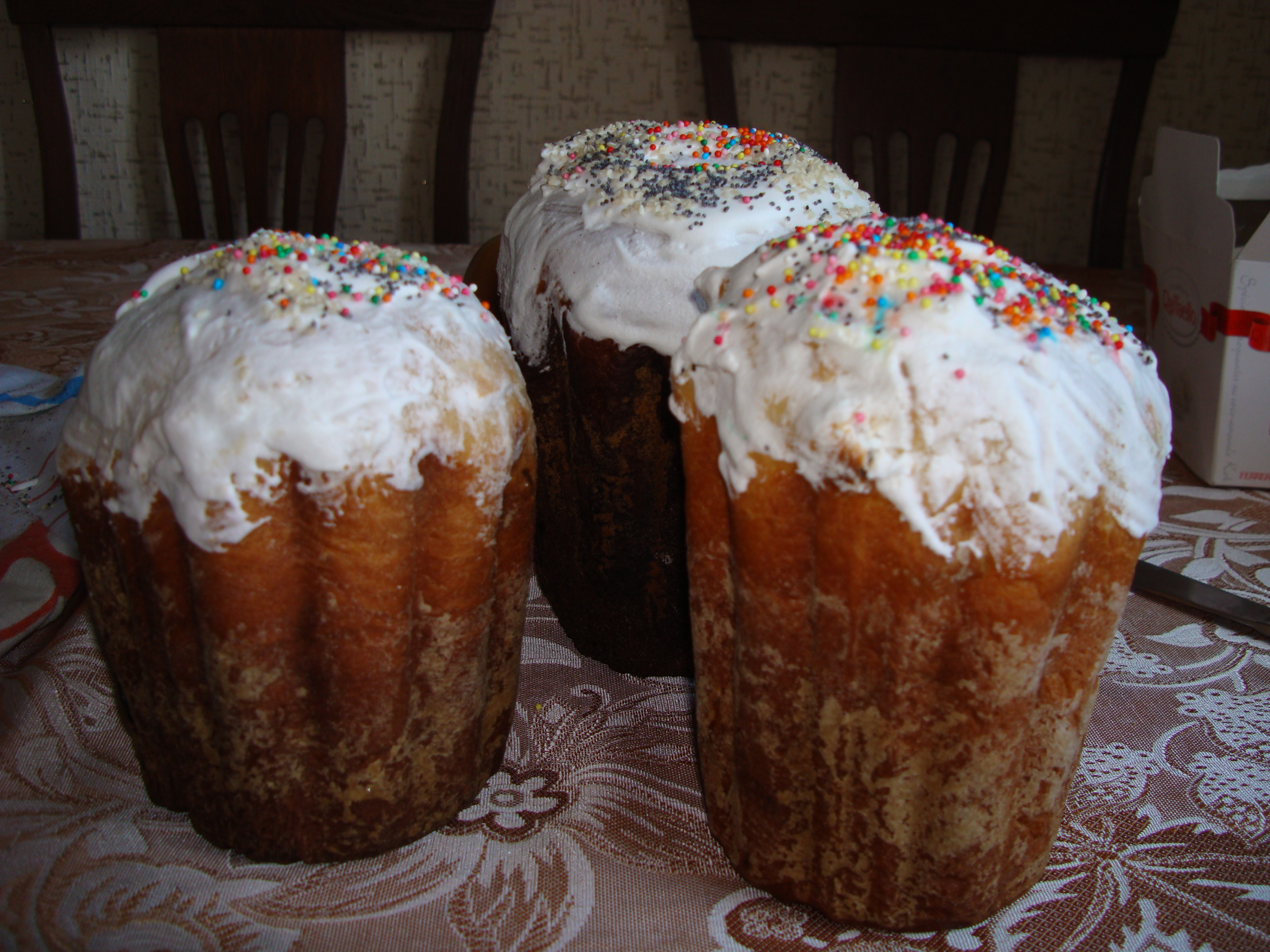
Kulich

Kulich is the Russian name for Easter bread. For the eastern Slavs, festive bread was round and tall, and dough decorations were made on top of it. The cylindrical shape of the cake is associated with the church practice of baking artos. The Paska bread tradition spread in cultures which were connected to the Byzantine Empire and is a traditional cultural part of countries with an Orthodox Christian population. It is eaten in countries like Russia, Belarus, Ukraine, Romania, Armenia, Georgia, Moldova, North Macedonia and Serbia. Kulich is a variant of paska Easter breads and represents not only Easter but also the spring. Easter is a very important celebration in Eastern European countries, even more important than Christmas.

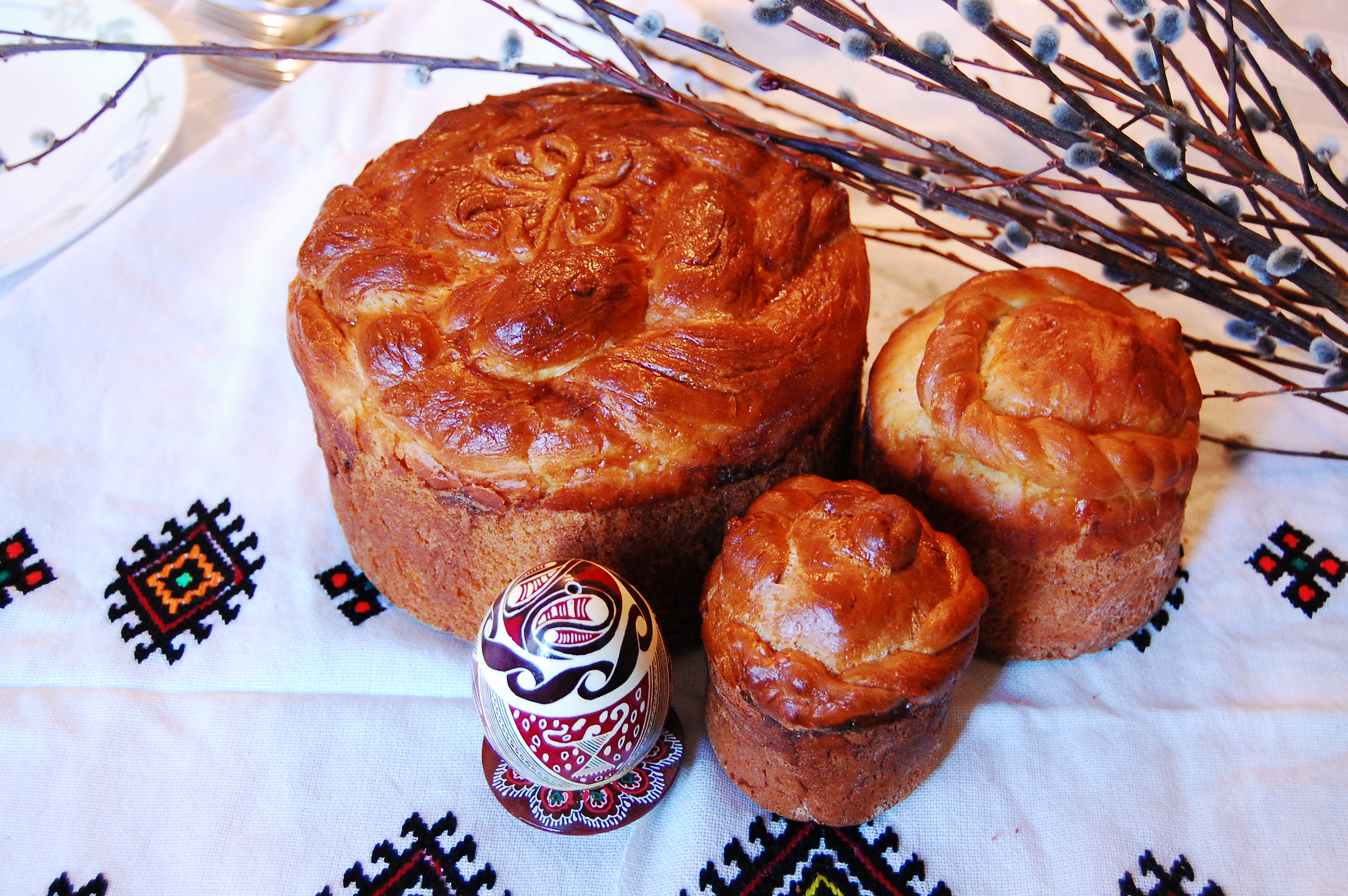
Traditional Ukrainian paska bread with a pysanka and willow switches

Paska is a sweet decorative bread native to Russia, Slovakia and Ukraine. It is a variation of Easter bread, a Christian tradition particularly spread in Central and Eastern Europe, and countries with cultural connections to the ancient Byzantine Empire, Eastern Orthodoxy or Eastern Catholicism. Easter breads are a traditional element in the Easter holidays of Armenia, Austria, Belarus, Bosnia and Herzegovina, Bulgaria, Croatia, the Czech Republic, Georgia, Germany, Greece, Hungary, Italy, Lithuania, Moldova, Montenegro, North Macedonia, Poland, Romania, Russia, Serbia, Slovakia, Slovenia, Switzerland and Ukraine. It is also a common tradition amongst the Assyrian diaspora. It is also eaten in countries with large immigrant populations from Central and Eastern Europe such as the United States, Canada and the United Kingdom.

== List of Easter foods ==
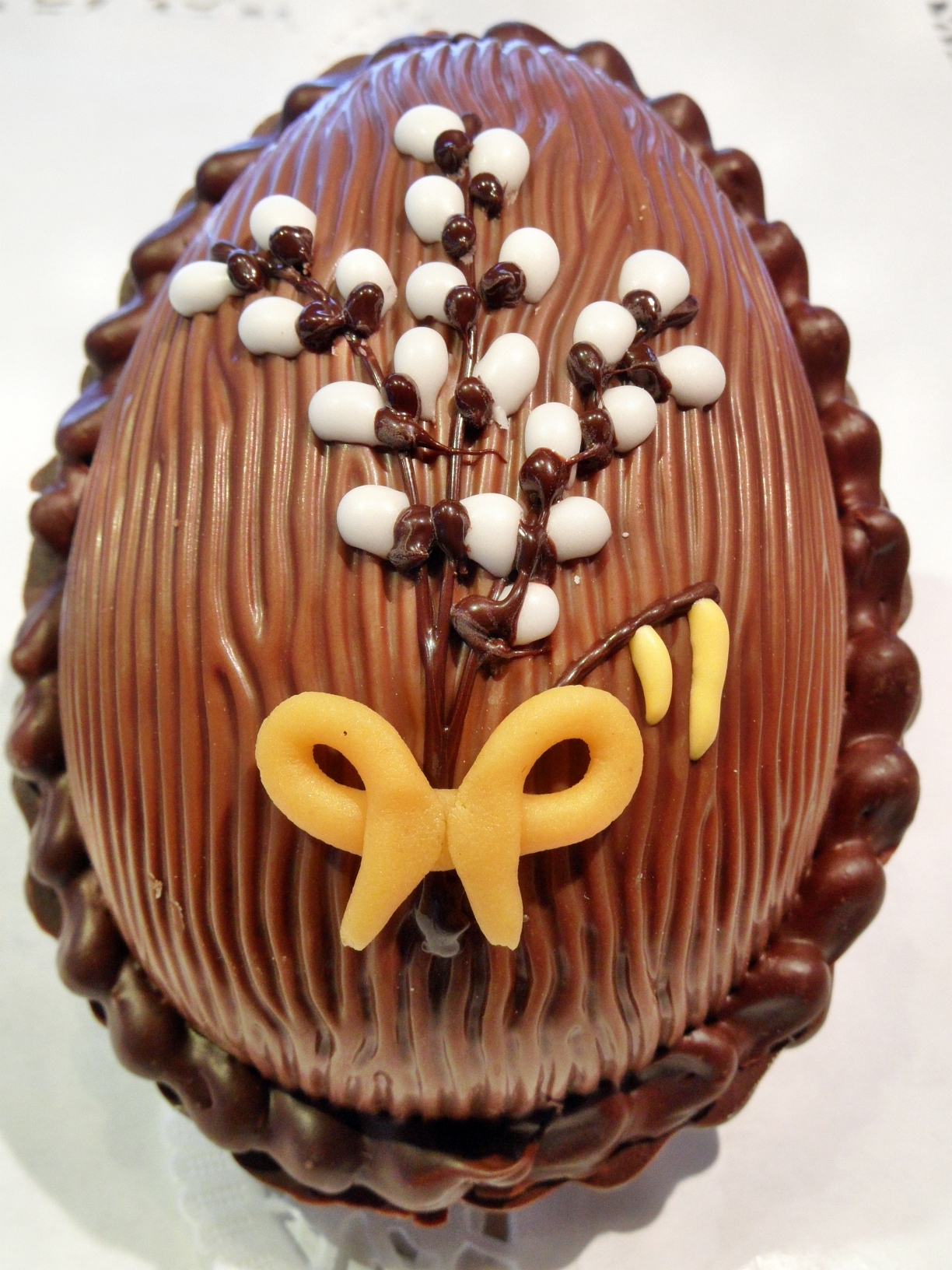
A chocolate Easter egg

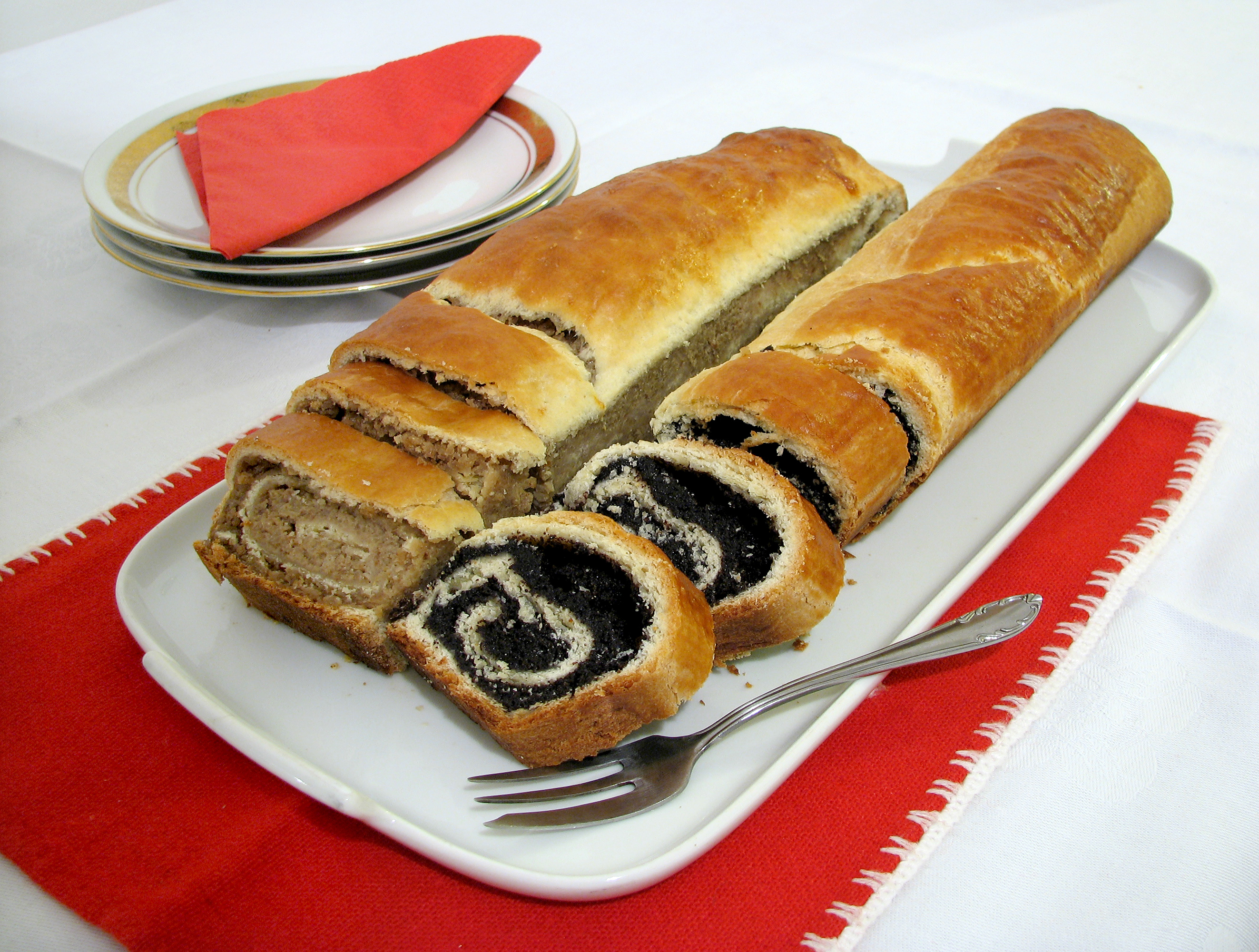
Poppy seed roll

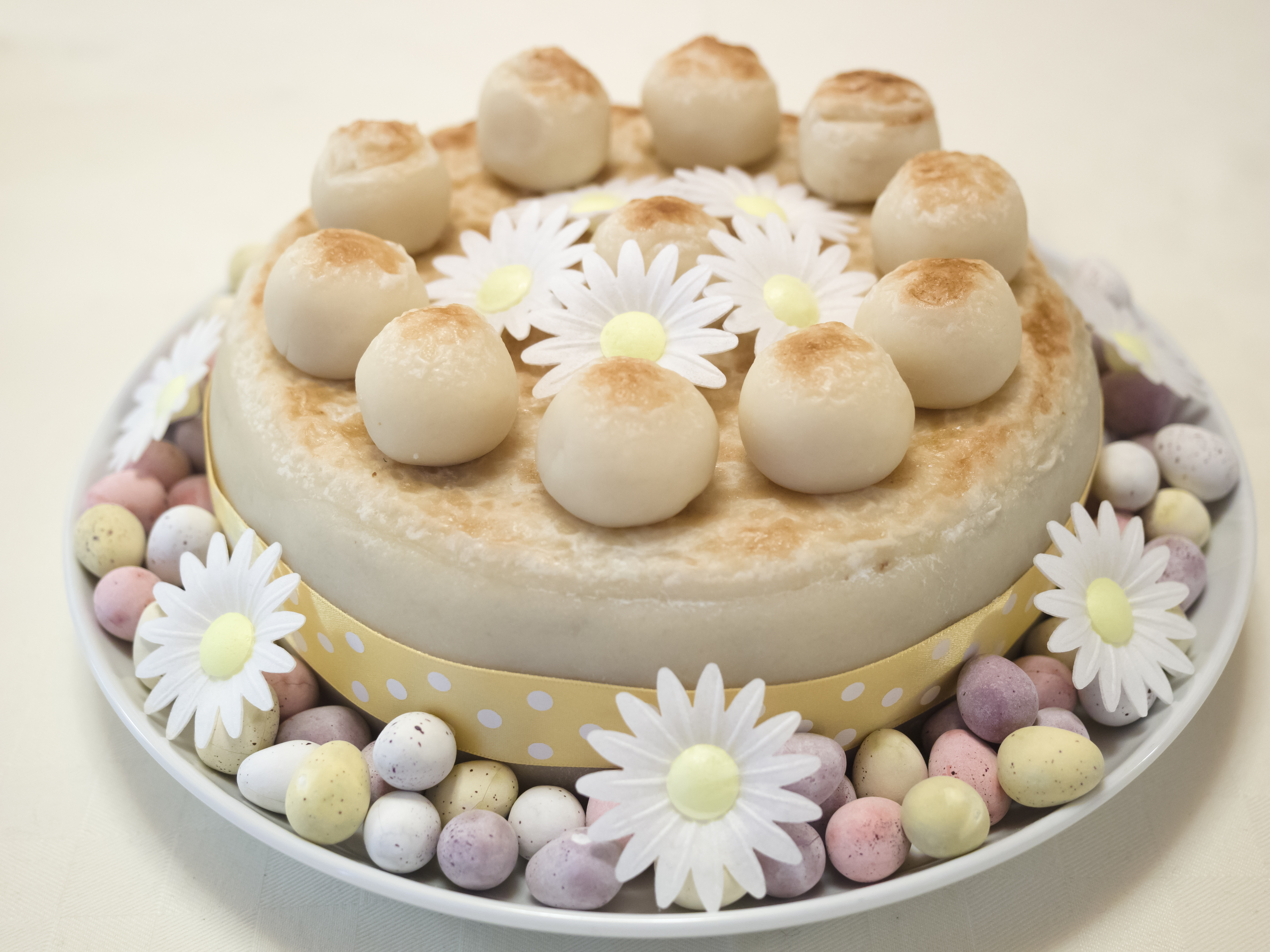
Simnel cake

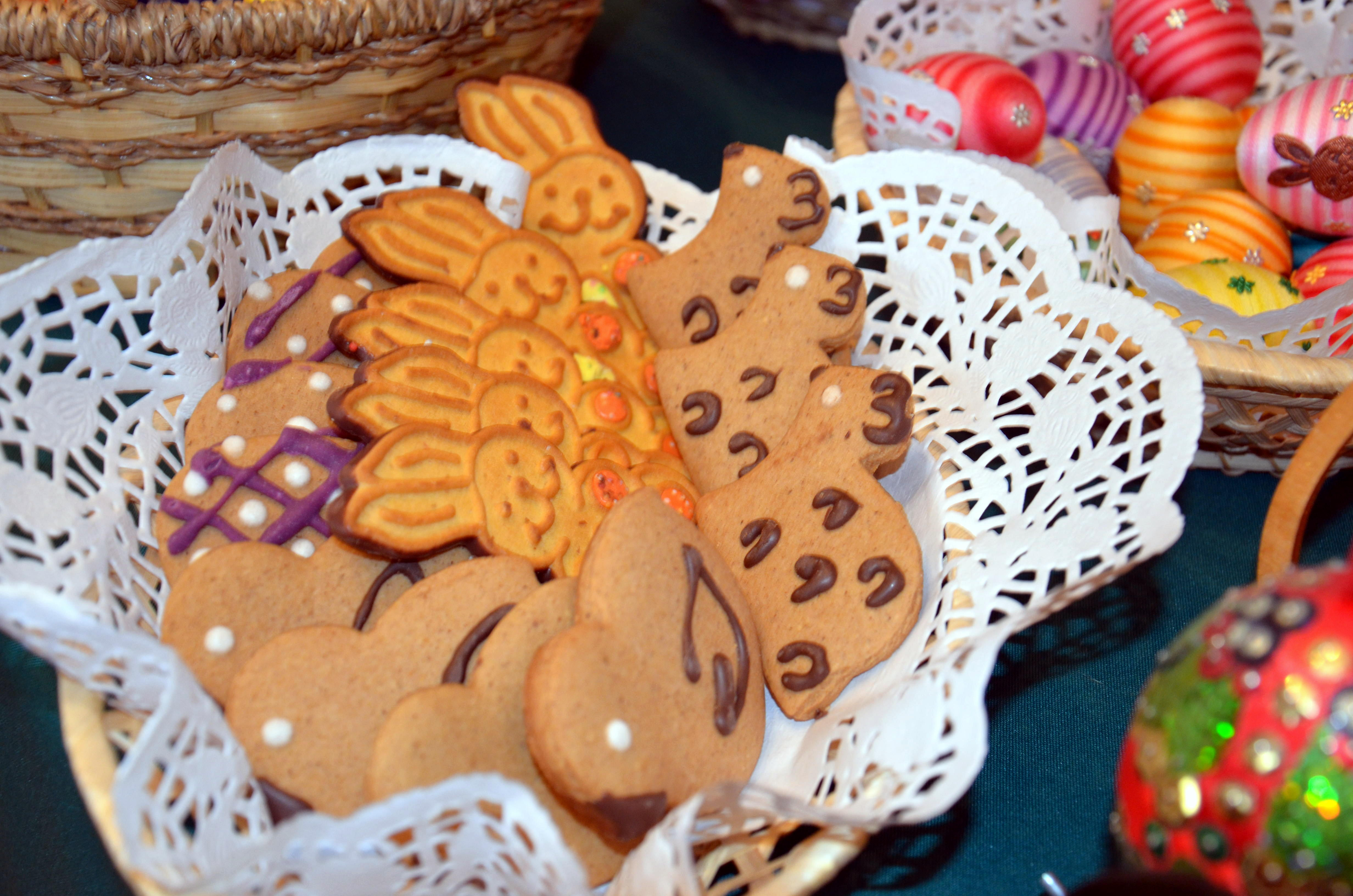
Easter biscuits

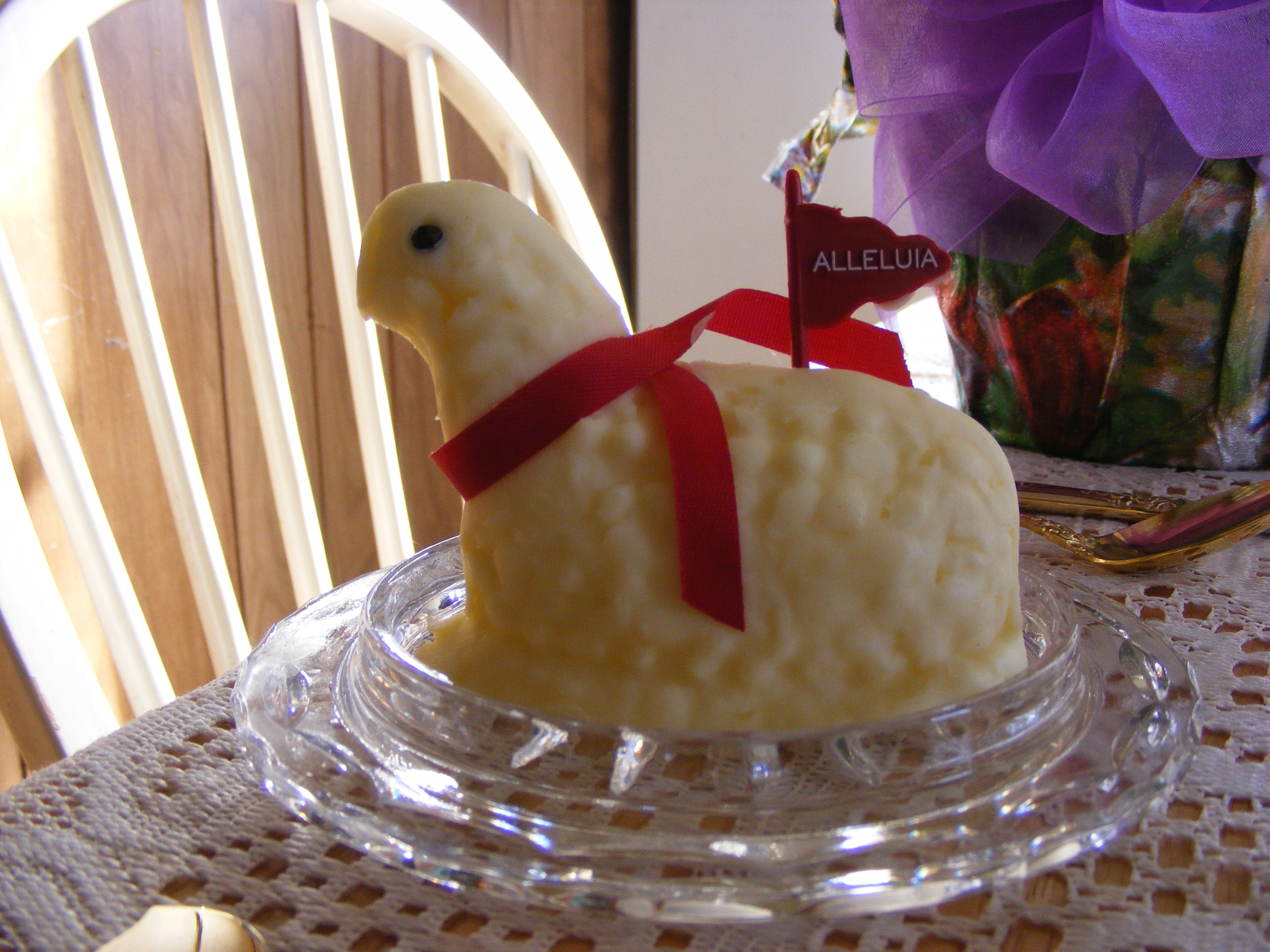
Butter lamb

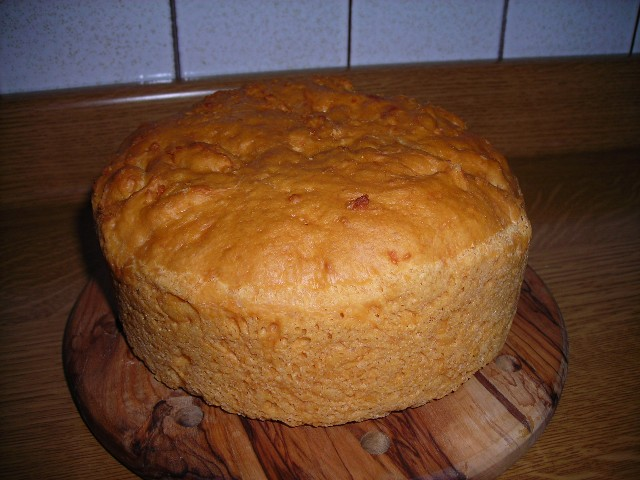
Pizza di Pasqua

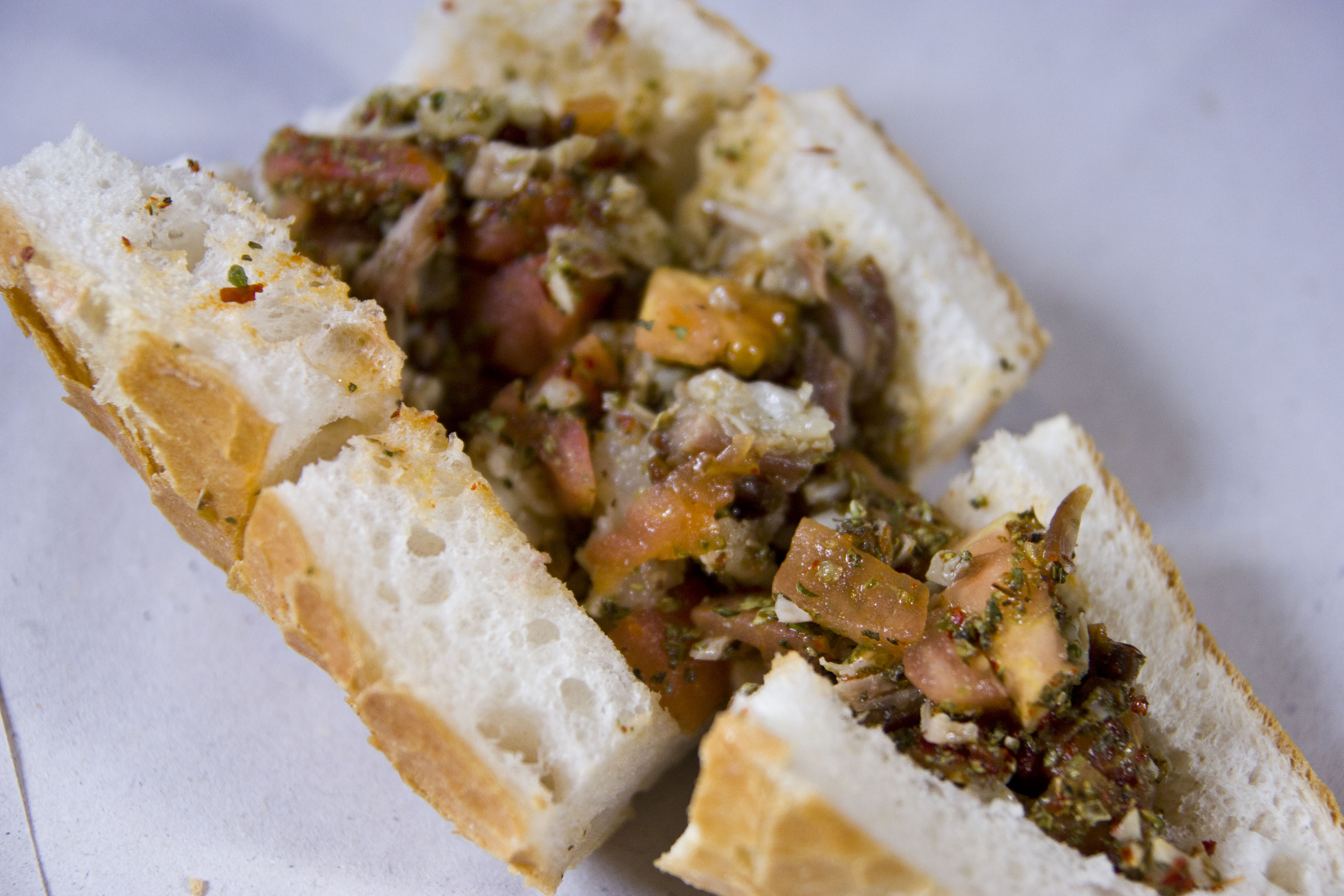
Kokoretsi

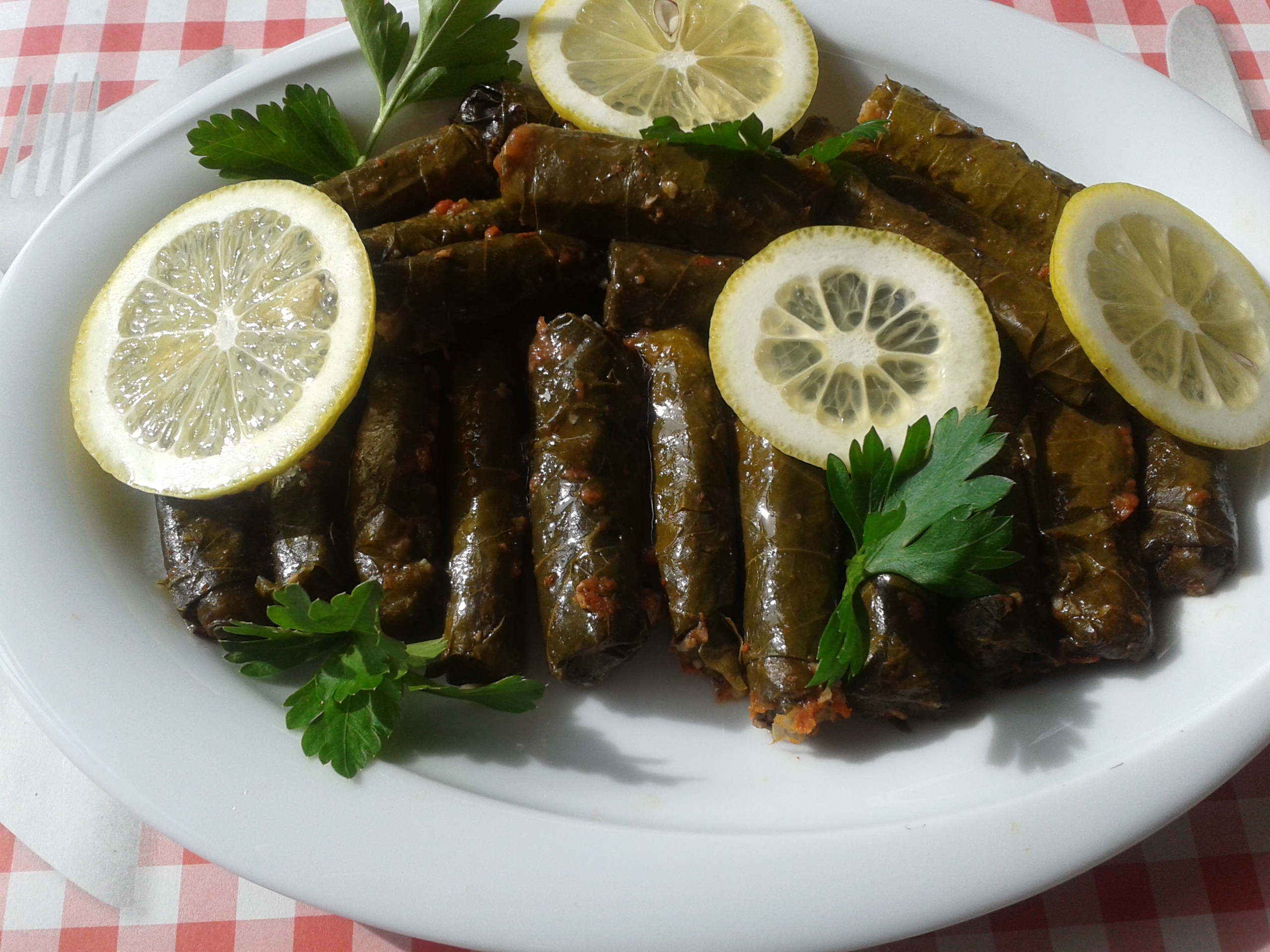
Sarma

Easter foods include:

- Abbacchio, in Italy
- Akvavit, in Scandinavia
- Artos, in the Eastern Orthodox and Byzantine rite catholic churches.
- Awara broth, in French Guiana
- Babka, in the Jewish communities of Poland and Ukraine.
- Bigos, in Poland
- Butter lamb, for many Russian, Slovenian and Polish Catholics.
- Cacavellu, in Corsica
- Campanile, in Corsica
- Canestru, in Corsica
- Capirotada, in Mexico
- Cappello del prete, in Italy
- Casatiello, in Italy
- Cascarón, in Mexico
- Challah, for Christian Jews
- Chocolate bunny, general diffusion
- Chocolate egg, general diffusion
- Carrot cake, general diffusion
- Chakapuli, in Georgia
- Colomba di Pasqua, in Italy
- Cozonac, throughout Southeastern Europe, Romania, Bulgaria and Serbia, North Macedonia, Greece, etc.
- Dock pudding, in England
- Drob, in Romania
- Easter basket, general diffusion
- Easter biscuit, in England
- Easter bread, general diffusion
- Easter eggs, general diffusion
- Easter mona, in Spain
- Fanesca, in Ecuador
- Feseekh, in Egypt
- Figolla, in Malta
- Flaouna, in Cyprus and Greece
- Folar, in Portugal
- Grasshopper pie, in the United States
- Habichuelas con dulce, in Dominican Republic
- Harees, in Armenia
- Hornazo, in Spain
- Hot cross bun, in the United Kingdom, Australia, New Zealand, South Africa, Canada, India, Pakistan, Malta, United States and the Commonwealth Caribbean.
- Lazarakia, in Greece and Cyprus
- Jansson's temptation, in Sweden and Finland
- Jelly bean, in the United States
- Kerststol, in the Northwestern Europe
- Kibbeh nayyeh, in Levant
- Kifli, general diffusion
- Knafeh, for Christian Arabs
- Kolach, in Albania, Belarus, Bulgaria, Hungary, Moldova, Poland, Romania, Russia, Serbia, Ukraine
- Kokoretsi, in Balkans and Anatolia
- Koulourakia in Greece and Pontos
- Kulich, in Russia
- Inuliata, in Corsica
- Mämmi, in Finland
- Ma'amoul, for Christian Arabs
- Magiritsa, in Greece
- Maqluba, for Christian Arabs
- Marañuela, in Spain
- Mazurek, in Poland
- Paas, in the United States
- Pão-de-Ló, in Portugal
- Paska, in Russia, Slovakia and Ukraine.
- Paretak pastries, in Bosnia and Herzegovina
- Paskha, in the Eastern Orthodox countries
- Pastiera, in Italy
- Peeps, in the United States
- Penia, in Italy
- Pesaha Appam, in India
- Pickled herring, general diffusion
- Pinca, in Croatia, Montenegro, Slovenia and Italy
- Pizza di Pasqua, in Italy
- Pizzelle, in Italy
- Pogaca, in the Balkans and Hungary
- Poppy seed roll, general diffusion
- Portuguese sweet bread, in Portugal
- Salted herring, general diffusion
- Sárgatúró, in Hungary
- Sarma, former Ottoman territories
- Simnel cake, in the United Kingdom
- Šoldra, in Poland, Germany and the Czech Republic
- Święconka, in Poland
- Tansy cake, in the medieval English cuisine
- Tsoureki, Armenia and Greece
- West Slavic fermented cereal soups, in the West Slavic countries

== See also ==
- Chiviri
- Fat Tuesday
- List of foods with religious symbolism
- Passover
- Pisanica (Croatian)
- Śmigus-Dyngus
