= Folar =

Portuguese bread

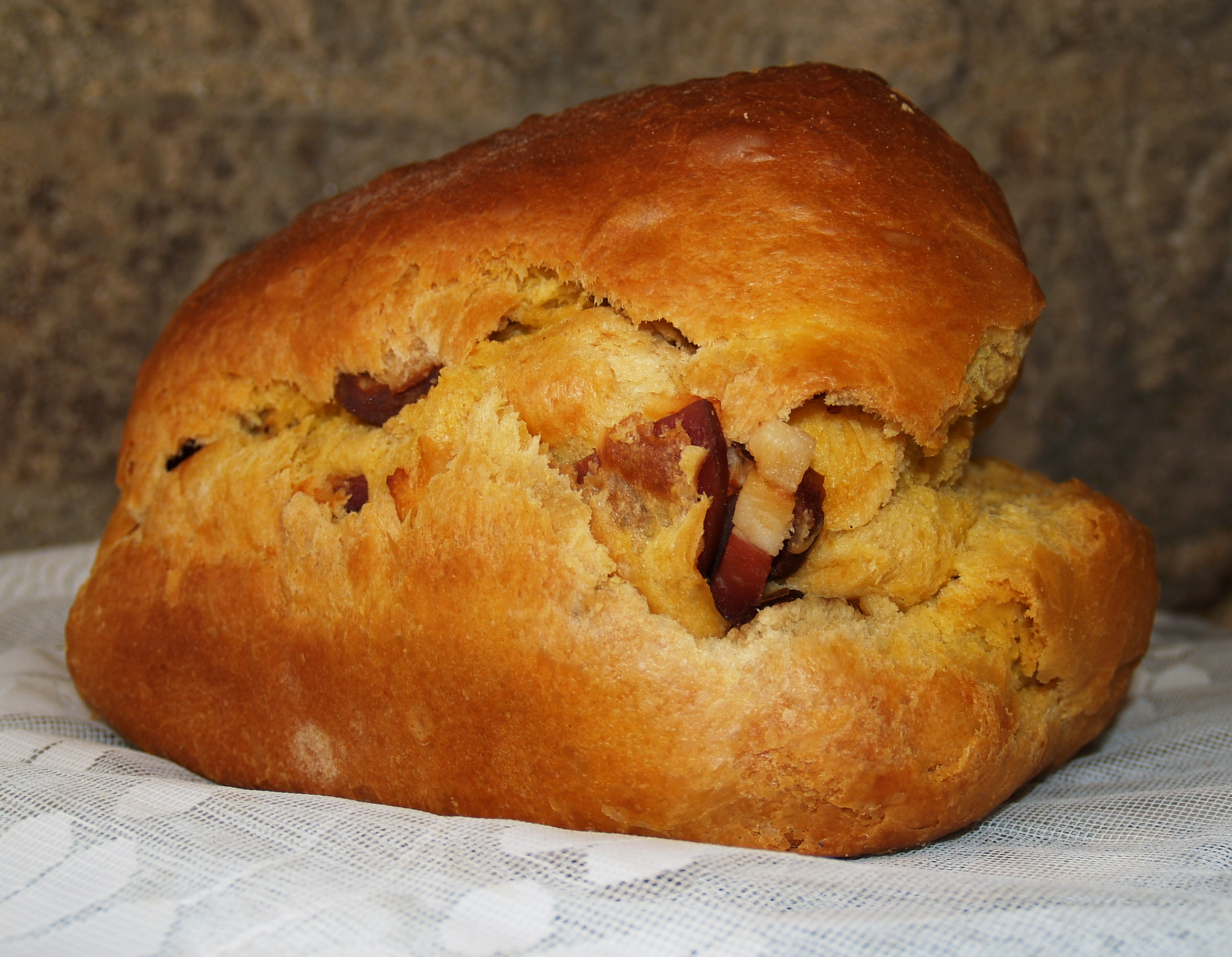
- Folar de Chaves
- Alternative names: Folar de Páscoa
- Type: Easter bread
- Place of origin: Portugal

Folar or folar de Páscoa is a traditional Portuguese bread served at Easter. The recipe varies from region to region and it may be sweet or savory.

During Easter festivities, godchildren usually bring a bouquet of violets to their godmother on Palm Sunday and this, on Easter Sunday, offers him a folar.

Folar is sometimes served with a boiled egg, that symbolically represents rebirth and the Resurrection.

Folar de Chaves, popular in the north-eastern Portuguese regions of Chaves and Valpaços, is stuffed with pork, ham, salpicão and linguiça.

There are also sweet folars like the folar from Olhão, that consists of seven layers with melted sugar and cinnamon, and the more common folar with anise and cinnamon.

== See also ==
- Šoldra, Silesian Easter bread stuffed with meat
- Easter foods
- Portuguese sweet bread
