= Butter lamb =

Butter sculpture associated with Easter

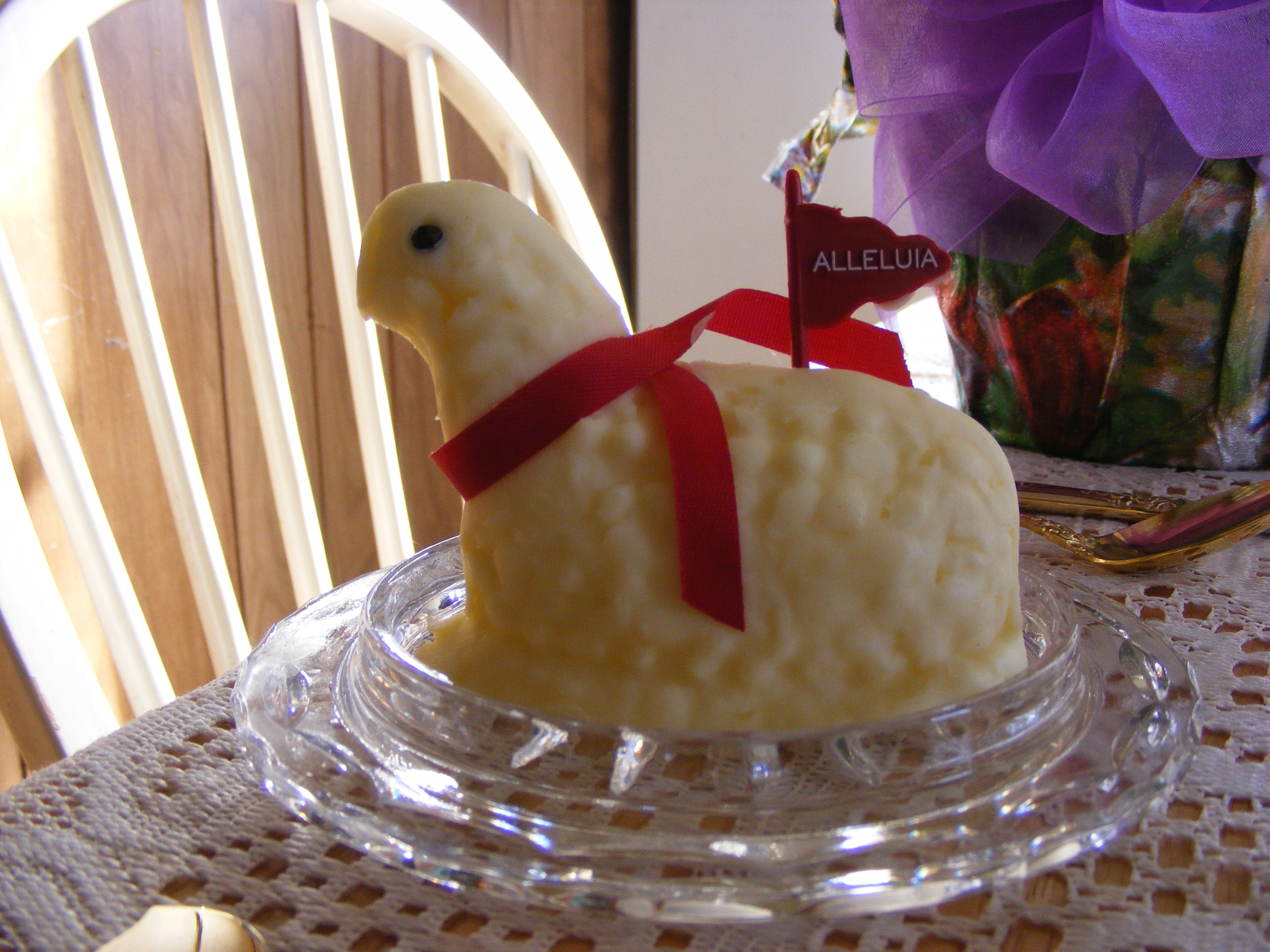
A butter lamb

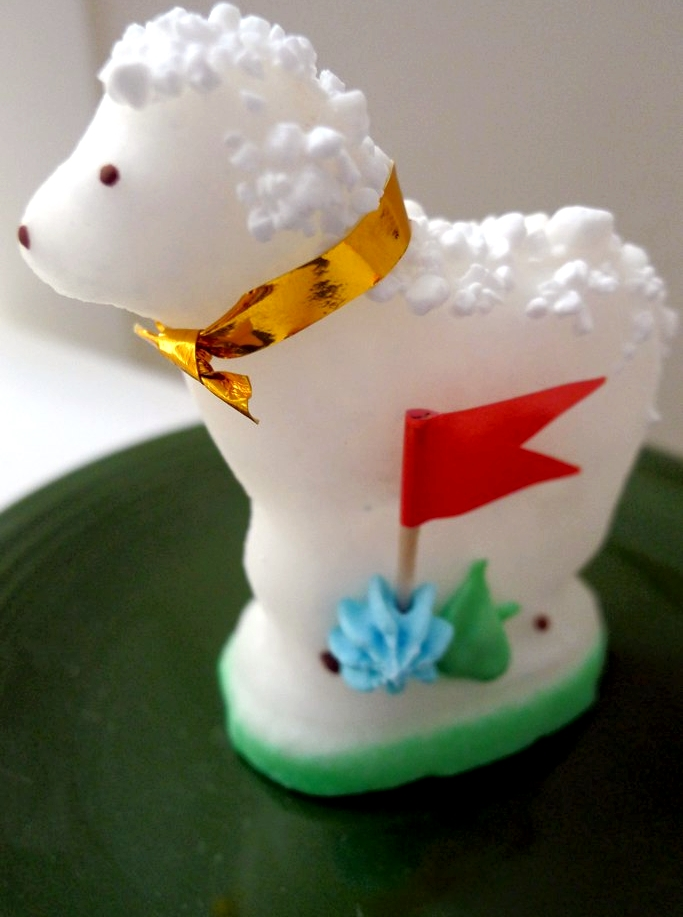
Sugar lamb for Easter celebrations, an alternative for butter lamb

The butter lamb, also known as a buttered lamb, is a traditional butter sculpture accompanying the Easter meal for many Russian, Slovenian and Polish Catholics. Butter is shaped into a lamb either by hand or in a lamb-shaped mold. The butter lamb represents the Paschal Lamb, Jesus, who sacrificed himself on Good Friday; as such, the sculpture may be shaped into a butter cross that "symbolizes Christ's goodness." It is also sold at delis, Polish specialty markets, and some general grocery stores at Easter time. The butter lamb is a particular specialty sold at Buffalo, New York's Broadway Market thanks to Malczewski's Butter Lambs who has kept the Polish tradition alive for decades. Many people flock to the famous market to buy butter lambs as an annual tradition signifying the start of Easter and spring. Also, every year during Holy Week, the county executive of Erie County, New York (which has Buffalo as its capital city) satirically gives a "pardon" to a butter lamb. This is a spoof of the National Thanksgiving Turkey Presentation shortly before Thanksgiving in which the incumbent President of the United States is presented with a turkey in the White House; the turkey is then satirically given a pardon by the President and the turkey (alongside a spare turkey that is used if the other one gets sick before the presentation) is then sent off to a farm where it will live out the rest of its life.

Frequently, the eyes are made with peppercorns or dried cloves and a white banner with a red cross on a toothpick is placed on its back.

Its name in Russian is Barashek Iz Masla (барашек из масла). The sugar lamb is also a popular variant.

== See also ==
- Easter foods
