= Magiritsa =

Greek lamb offal soup associated with Easter

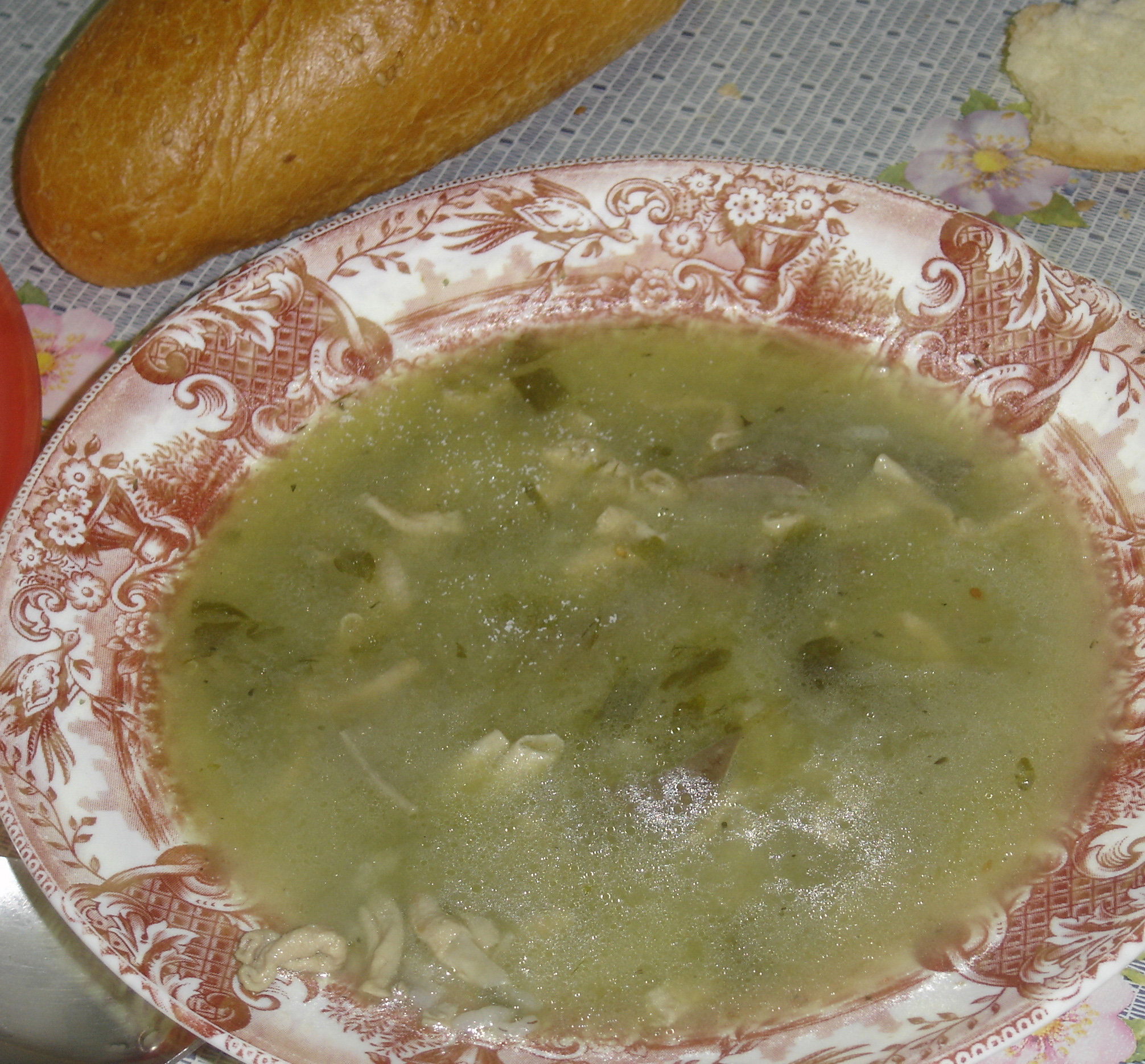
- Alternative names: Easter soup, Easter Sunday soup, Easter lamb soup
- Type: Soup
- Place of origin: Greece
- Main ingredients: Lamb offal

Magiritsa (Greek: μαγειρίτσα Greek pronunciation: [maɣiˈrit͡sa]) is a Greek soup made from lamb offal, associated with the Easter (Pascha) tradition of the Greek Orthodox Church. Accordingly, Greek-Americans and Greek-Canadians sometimes call it "Easter soup", "Easter Sunday soup", or "Easter lamb soup". In some parts of Greece, most notably Thessaly, it is not served as soup but rather as a fricassee, where it contains only offal and a large variety of vegetables, but no onions or rice, as in the soup.

== Traditional use ==
Magiritsa is eaten to break the fast of the Greek Orthodox Great Lent, the 40 days before Easter. Its role and ingredients result from its association with the roasted lamb traditionally served at the Paschal meal; in its traditional form, magiritsa consists of the offal removed from the lamb before roasting, flavored with seasonings and sauces. Prepared on Holy Saturday along with the next day's lamb, magiritsa is consumed immediately after the midnight Divine Liturgy.

When eaten on Easter morning after church, magiritsa is sometimes accompanied by salad and cheese, tsoureki sweet bread, and hard-boiled eggs dyed red.

== See also ==
- List of soups
