= Easter biscuit =

Traditional British cuisine

- Type: Biscuit
- Place of origin: England
- Region or state: West Country
- Main ingredients: Flour, butter, egg yolk, baking powder, sugar, currant

Easter biscuits are a traditional British cuisine gift, given to guests on Easter Sunday.

Originating from the West Country, they are made from flour, butter, egg yolk, baking powder, and sugar. Lightly spiced, the currant-studded soft and round biscuits have a soft, biscuity, sugary crunch. Some traditional recipes originating from the Somerset-area include Cassia oil, in the belief that it was used in the embalming process used to clean Jesus's body after his crucifixion.

Most often, they are slightly bigger than traditional British biscuits, at up to 4 inches (10 cm) in diameter.

== See also ==
- Koulourakia Greek Easter biscuits
