= Lazarakia =

Sweet spice breads made on Lazarus Saturday

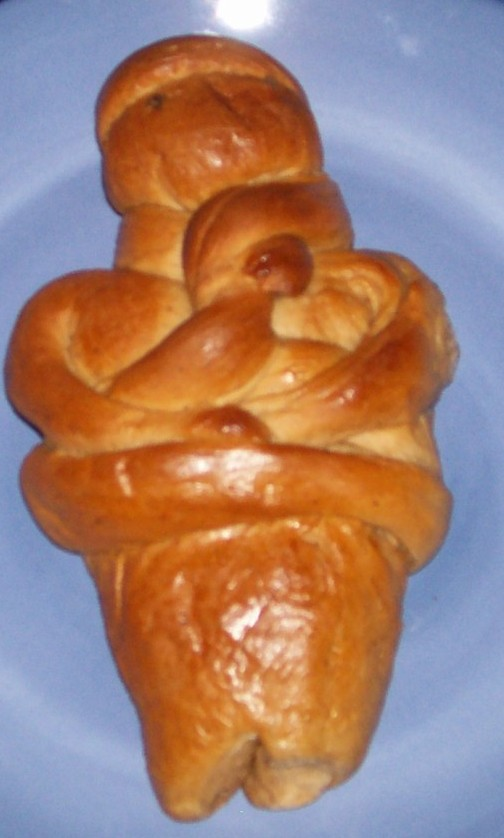
- Lazarakia on a plate
- Type: Sweet bread
- Place of origin: Greece and Cyprus
- Main ingredients: Sweet spices

Lazarákia (Greek: Λαζαράκια, "Little Lazaruses") are small, sweet spice breads made in Greece and Cyprus by Orthodox Christians on Lazarus Saturday, the Saturday that begins Holy Week. They are eaten to celebrate the miracle of Jesus raising Lazarus from the dead. They are shaped like a man wrapped in a shroud, supposedly Saint Lazarus of Bethany, with cloves for eyes. They contain several sweet spices and are a fasting Lenten food, meaning that they do not contain any dairy products or eggs. For that reason, unlike the tsourekia, they are brushed with olive oil instead of egg or butter for a gloss finish.

Women in Lipsi were symbolically equated with the Virgin Mary and part of the symbolism of Holy Week was that of death experienced through motherhood. Though in modern times lazarákia are mostly purchased at the bakery, in past times women would knead the dough for the lazarákia, shaped in human form, as the symbol of life overcoming death. One of the lazaráki would be kept in the home for the entire year and either eaten the following year or thrown into the sea to be eaten by fish.
