= Koulourakia =

Easter biscuit from Greece

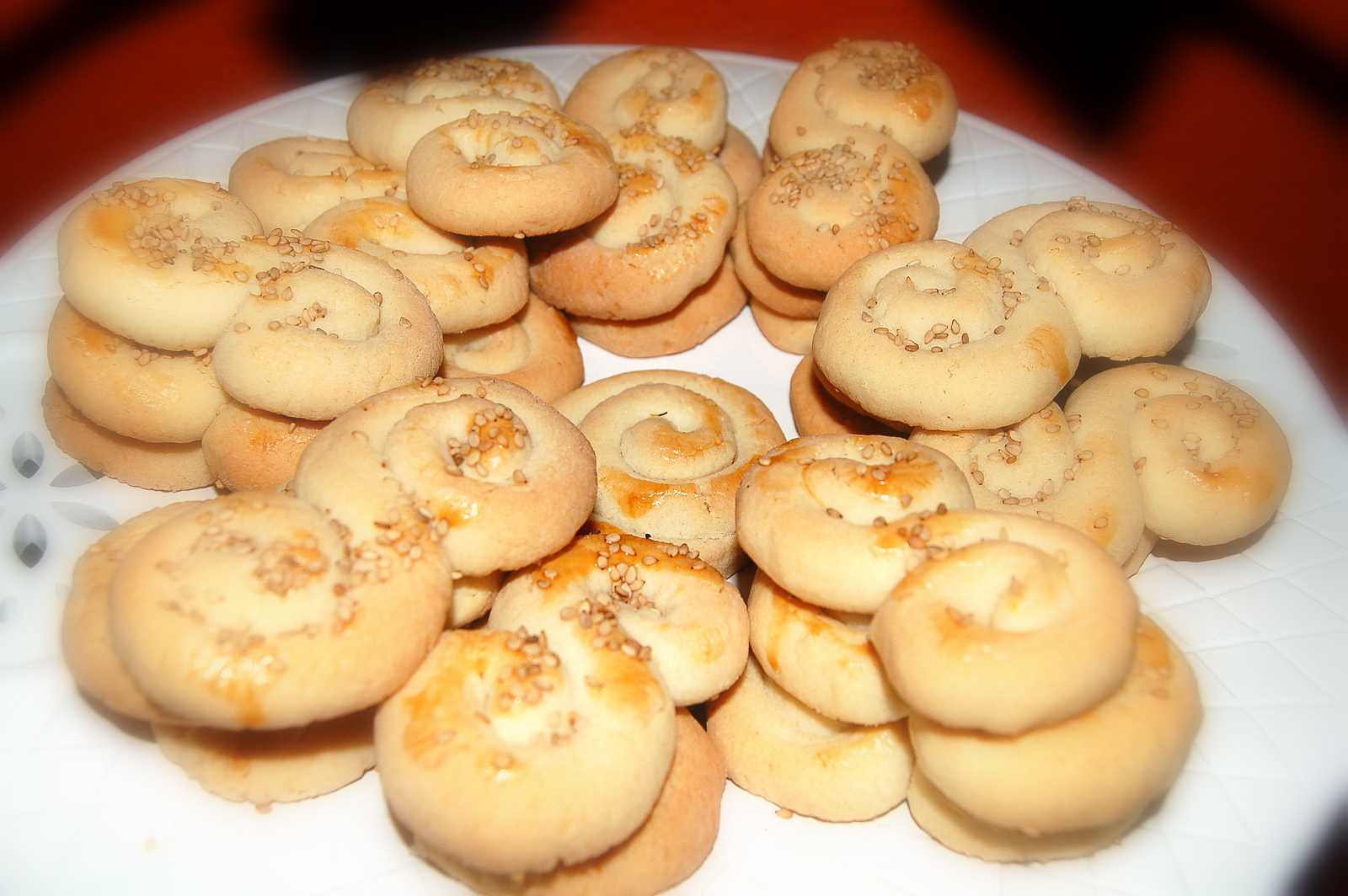
- Koulourakia
- Alternative names: Easter biscuits
- Type: Pastry
- Course: Dessert
- Place of origin: Greece
- Region or state: Greece, Cyprus, Pontos
- Serving temperature: Hot or cold
- Main ingredients: Butter

Koulourakia (Note: (Greek: Κουλουράκια, IPA: [Kuluˈraca]; singular: Greek: Κουρουλάκι, romanized: Koulouráki)) or Koulouria, (Note: (Greek: Κουλούρια, IPA: [Kuluˈra]; singular: Greek: Κουλούρι, romanized: Kouloúri)) or kerkele in Pontic Greek, are a traditional Greek dessert, typically made around Easter to be eaten after Holy Saturday.

They are a butter-based pastry, traditionally hand-shaped, with egg glaze on top. They have a sweet delicate flavor with a hint of vanilla. Koulourakia are well known for their sprinkle of sesame seeds and distinctive ring shape. In fact, the word is the diminutive form for a ring-shaped loaf or roll.

The pastries are traditionally shaped into spirals, but can be shaped into braided circles, hairpin twists, figure eights, twisted wreaths, horseshoes or Greek letters. Often, a clove is added atop the center of the pastry for added flavor. They are commonly eaten with morning coffee or afternoon tea. Like all pastries, they are normally kept in dry conditions in a jar with a lockable lid.

== History ==
Koulourakia have been prepared since at least the time of the Minoan civilization. The Minoans sometimes prepared the pastries like small snakes, because they worshiped the snake for its healing powers.

== See also ==
- Easter biscuit – An English Easter treat
- Biscotti
