= Paas (dye) =

Brand of Easter egg dye made since 1893

Paas (/ˈpɑːz/; trademarked as PAAS) is an American brand of Easter egg dye that is owned by Signature Brands, LLC.

== History ==
The original Paas Easter egg dye was invented by American William Townley, the owner of a drug store in Newark, New Jersey, where he concocted recipes for home products. In 1893, he figured out how to concentrate dye in tablet form and launched the modern Easter egg dyeing kit. The original price of each tablet was five cents, and customers would make the dye by combining the tablets with water and vinegar. Townley eventually renamed his business the Paas Dye Company. "Paas" comes from Passen, Pennsylvania Dutch for Easter.

In 1901, according to a State of New Jersey inspection report, seven men and twenty women were employed in Townley's production facility at 60 Shipman Street in Newark. Paas eventually became the largest manufacturer of Easter egg dyes, and Philip B. Townley succeeded his father as head of the company.

== Products ==
- Traditional - with 5 dye tablets to mix with vinegar and water
- Beaded
- Hologram
- Crack & Color
- Stencil
- Zoo Fun
- CAMO
- Sports Fanatic
- Egg Scribblers
- Egg Heads
- Sparkling Glitter
- Speckled Eggs
- Tie Dye
- Eggs-A-Glow
- Tattoos
- Egg Splash
- EggArounds
- EGGspress Yourself
- Color Cups
- Grip 'n' Dip
- Color Snaps
- Active Volcanoes

== Popular culture references ==
- Comedian Patton Oswalt does a routine about the traditional dye kit.
- The Paas dye kit is prominently displayed in an episode entitled "Fantastic Easter Special" of South Park. The Marsh family are coloring eggs with a Paas dye kit, and Stan begins asking his father why people color eggs at Easter time.
- An animated Easter special Peter and the Magic Egg (1983) starring the voice of Ray Bolger was created as a tie-in to the product. Since its release, the four main animals from said special: Feathers the Duck, Cotton the Rabbit, Terrance the Turtle, and Lollichop Lamb would serve as the mascots for the product for years to come. In recent days, only the former two continued to serve as the mascots, while the latter two were eventually dropped.
- NBC television show 30 Rock (in season 7, episode 1, "The Beginning of the End") mentions the egg dyeing company as owning the market, asking "when was the last time you bought a non-PAAS egg dye kit?"
