= Sárgatúró =

Hungarian Easter delicacy

sárgatúró
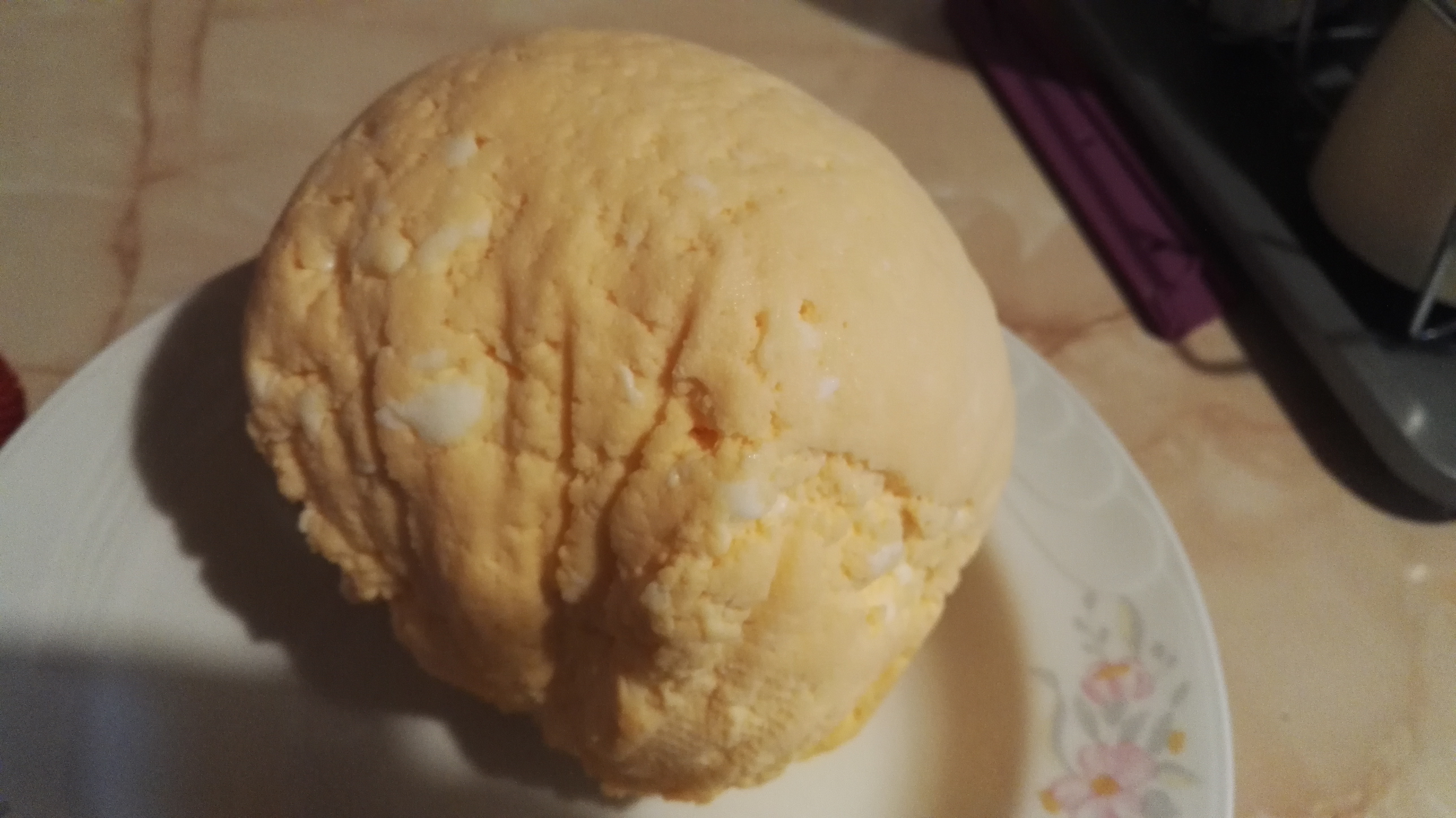
- Type: sweet dairy product
- Place of origin: Hungary
- Main ingredients: milk, chicken eggs, sugar, vanilla flavor

Sárgatúró (in literal translation: "yellow curd cheese") is a Hungarian Easter delicacy, prepared mostly in Eastern Catholic regions, notably in Szabolcs-Szatmár-Bereg County and in the Hajdúság.

== Preparation ==
It is made by combining milk, eggs and sugar and boiling the mixture, stirring often, until it begins to lump, much like curd cheese or quark. Vanilla flavor is then added. When the lumps have formed, the mixture is put into a strong cloth and squeezed to get extra moisture out. The top of the cloth is then tied with a ribbon and the sárgatúró hung outside to let it drip and stick together. It is served cold, with other Easter foods like ham, kalács and boiled eggs. Besides the basic recipe, family recipes may vary, adding raisins, and/or cinnamon or nutmeg as additional spices.

== Customs ==
Easter customs involving sárgatúró included bringing a food basket to the Easter mass, so that the priest would consecrate holiday food. In some villages, the consecrated basket was carried around the house to void off evil.
