= Marañuela =

Spanish sweet

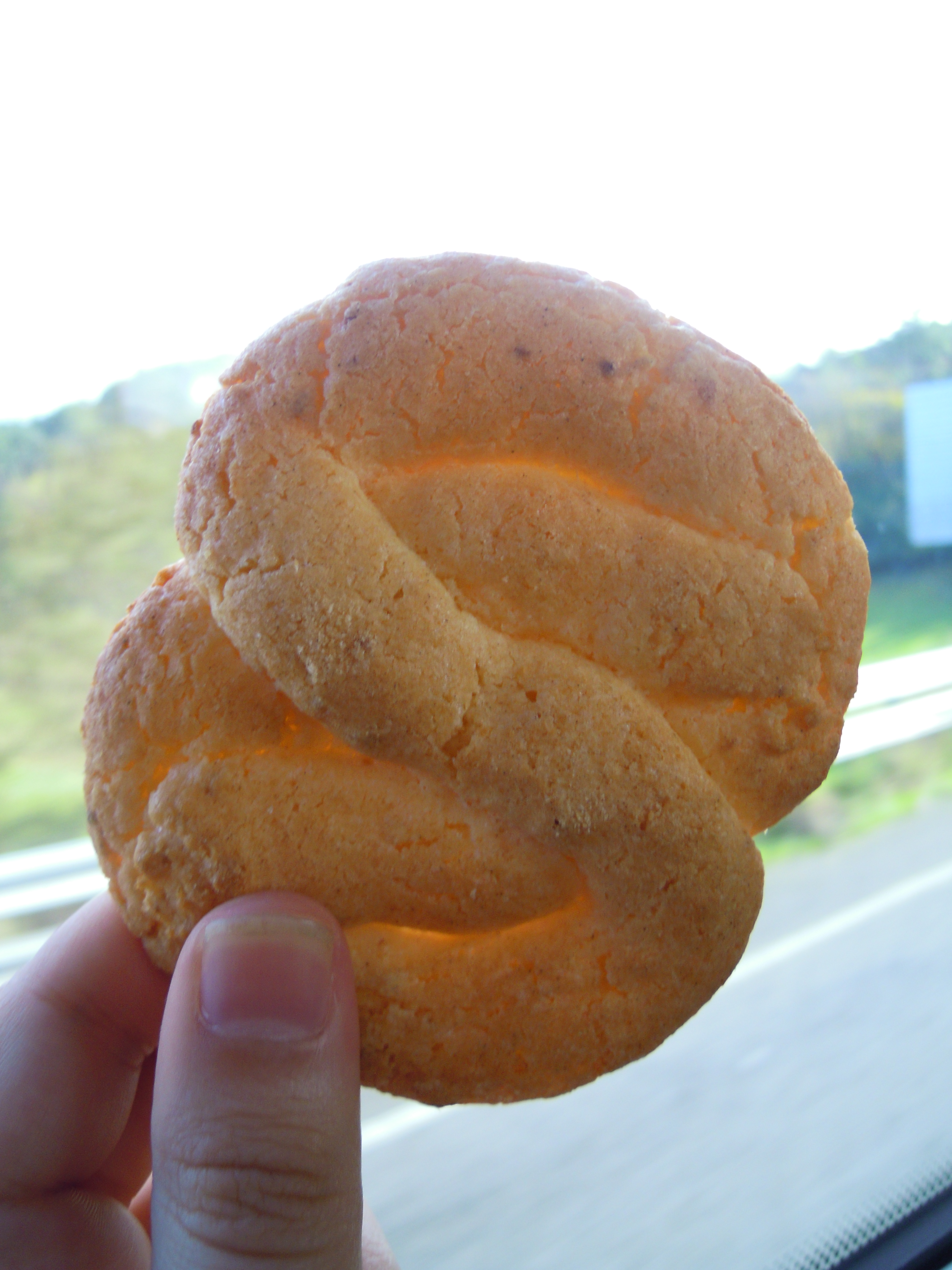
- Course: Sweet or dessert
- Place of origin: Candás and Luanco, Asturias
- Main ingredients: Flour, clarified butter, eggs, sugar, lemon zest

Marañuela is a typical sweet from Asturias, Spain, made mainly by flour, sugar, eggs, clarified butter, and lemon zest.

== Origin ==
Its origin is somewhat uncertain, although the closest history links it to the seafaring world. During Holy Week the boats used to return to port and stock up on them before leaving again. That is why traditionally they continue to be made during this time of year. They are typical of coastal villages Candás and Luanco, although the elaboration in these two places is slightly different.

Even though they can be made all year round, they are usually made on Resurrection Sunday and offered among family members, mainly among godparents and godchildren.

== Characteristics ==
Due to their history related to the sea, they used to be made in the shape of a sailor's knot, a tradition that still continues. Marañuelas are also made in a spiral shape, the so-called "marañuela biscuit", or in an intertwined form, the "marañuela bun". Sometimes in the shape of a four-cornered star, called for this reason, sometimes as a "horned bun": it is usually served as breakfast in thin slices, it being customary for the youngest to start by serving the four corners, usually the most toasted and crunchy. It is usually prepared on Resurrection Sunday, and on this occasion the godparents offer back the palm that the godchildren have given them on Palm Sunday. It is traditional to deliver this typical dessert together with a natural bird feather (mainly from birds typical of the area) and, in some councils, a small ceramic pitcher with homemade spiced wine.

== Other varieties ==
There is a variety of marañuela known as marañuela de Avilés, which is a kind of sweet bread. Both sweets are named the same but are completely different, both in shape and ingredients, since the marañuela from Avilés resembles a bread roll in shape and the marañuela from Luanco and Candás is more like a cookie.
