= Grasshopper pie =

Pie made with creme de menthe mousse

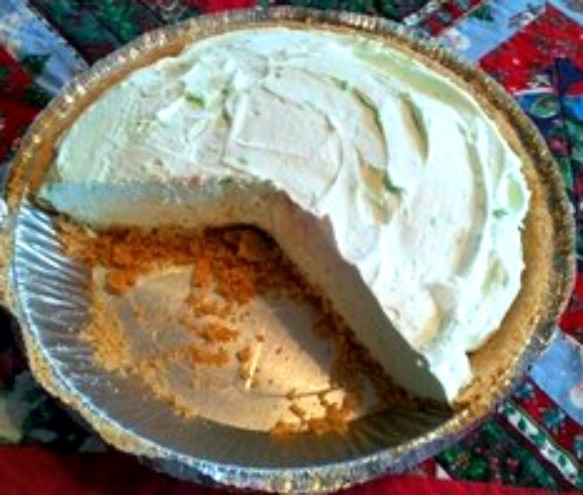
- Type: Pie
- Course: Dessert
- Place of origin: United States

Grasshopper pie is a no-bake mint-flavored mousse pie with a chocolate crumb crust. Typically light green in color, it is associated with spring, and especially with Easter celebrations in the United States. The pie takes its name from the Grasshopper cocktail.

== Preparation ==
Grasshopper pie filling is made by folding whipped cream into marshmallow or cream cheese. The cream cheese version is made by adding green food coloring to a mixture of condensed milk with cream cheese, then gently folding in chocolate-covered mint cookie crumbs and whipped topping. Alternately, melted marshmallows can be gently folded into fresh whipped cream. The filling is infused with creme de menthe and creme de cacao, which give the mousse its characteristic green coloring.

The crust is a chocolate cookie crumb crust, variations of which can be made with crumbled sandwich cookies, or by melting chocolate in a double boiler and stirring in crisped rice cereal, then pressing the mixture into a pie dish and allowing it to set in the refrigerator.
