= Simnel cake =

Layered fruit cake associated with Easter

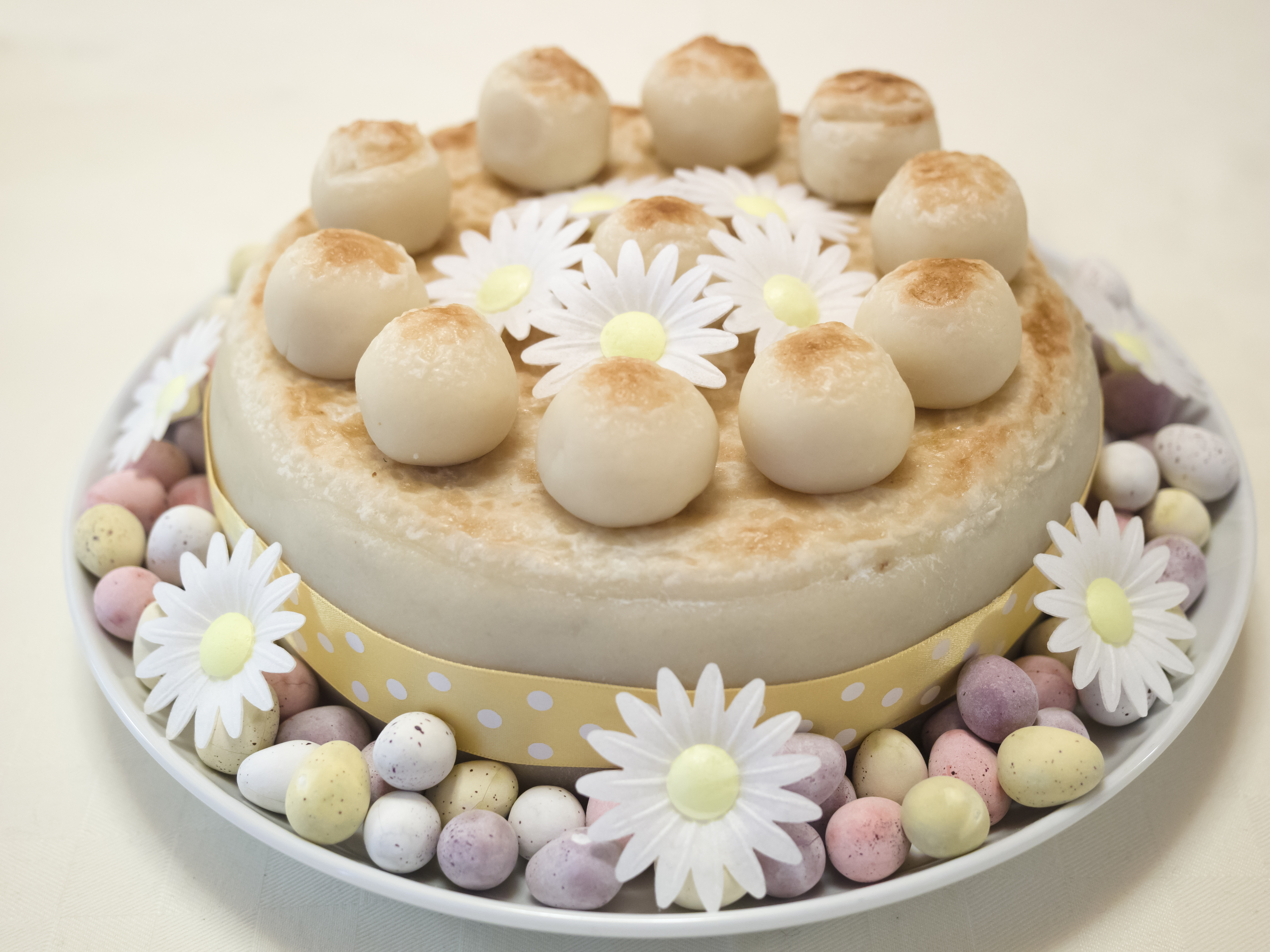
- Simnel cake (this one has ten balls around the edge and one in the centre, traditionally it would have all eleven around the edge)
- Type: Fruitcake
- Course: Dessert
- Place of origin: United Kingdom

Simnel cake is a fruitcake associated with Lent and Easter and widely eaten in the United Kingdom, Ireland and countries with patterns of migration from them. It is distinguished by layers of almond paste or marzipan, typically one in the middle and one on top, and a set of eleven balls made of the same paste. It was originally made for the fourth Sunday in Lent, also known as Laetare Sunday, the Refreshment Sunday of Lent (when the 40-day fast would be relaxed), Mothering Sunday, the Sunday of the Five Loaves, or Simnel Sunday. In the United Kingdom, it is commonly associated with Mothering Sunday and Easter Sunday.

== Decoration ==
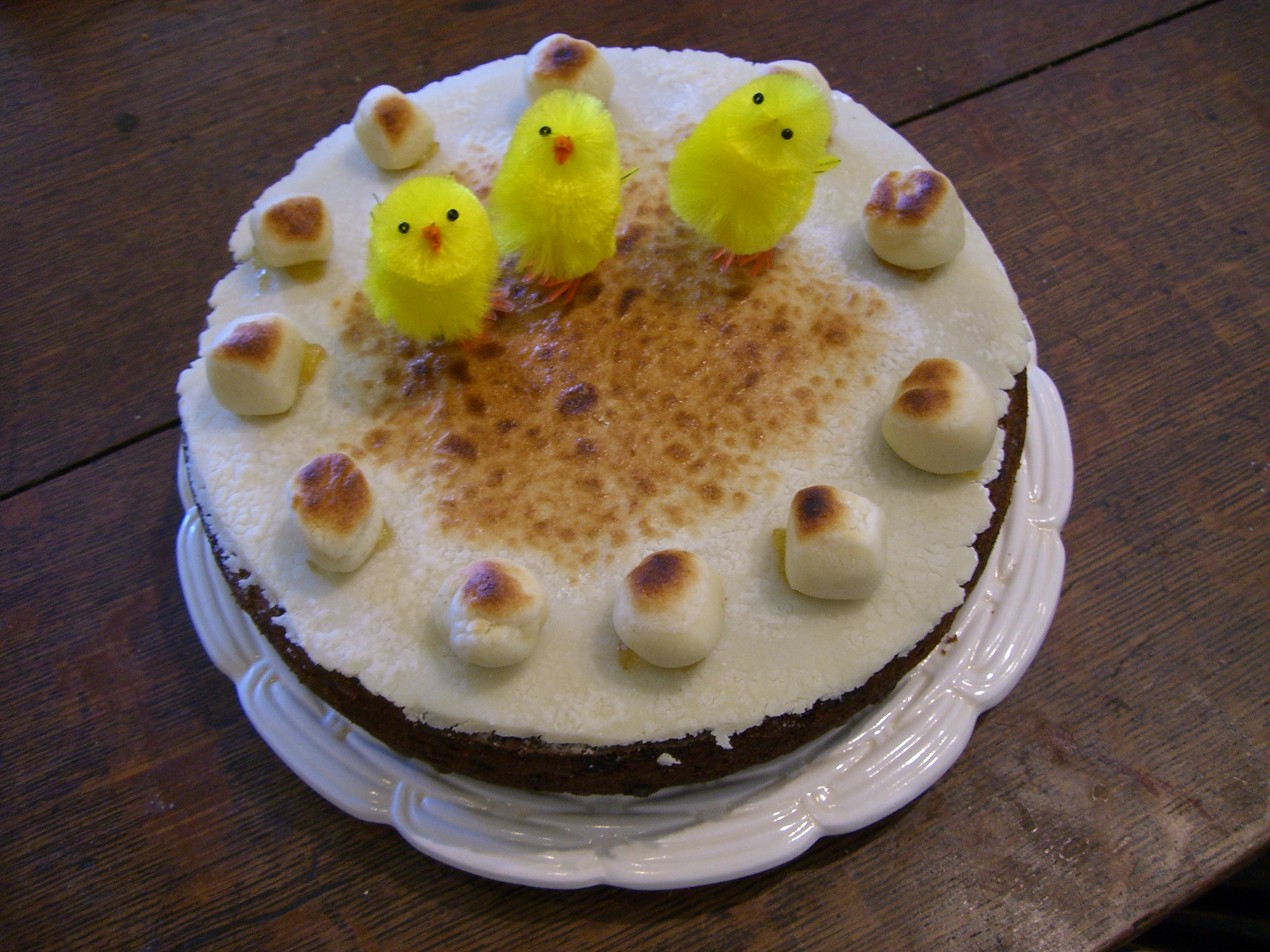
Simnel cake decorated with marzipan

Conventionally, 11 marzipan balls are used to decorate the cake, symbolising the 12 apostles minus Judas Iscariot. Occasionally, 12 are used, representing Jesus and the 11 apostles. An early reference to decorating with marzipan balls appears in May Byron's Pot-Luck Cookery, but with no mention of this symbolism, and her version may well be derived from earlier styles, which were sometimes crenellated.

== Ingredients ==
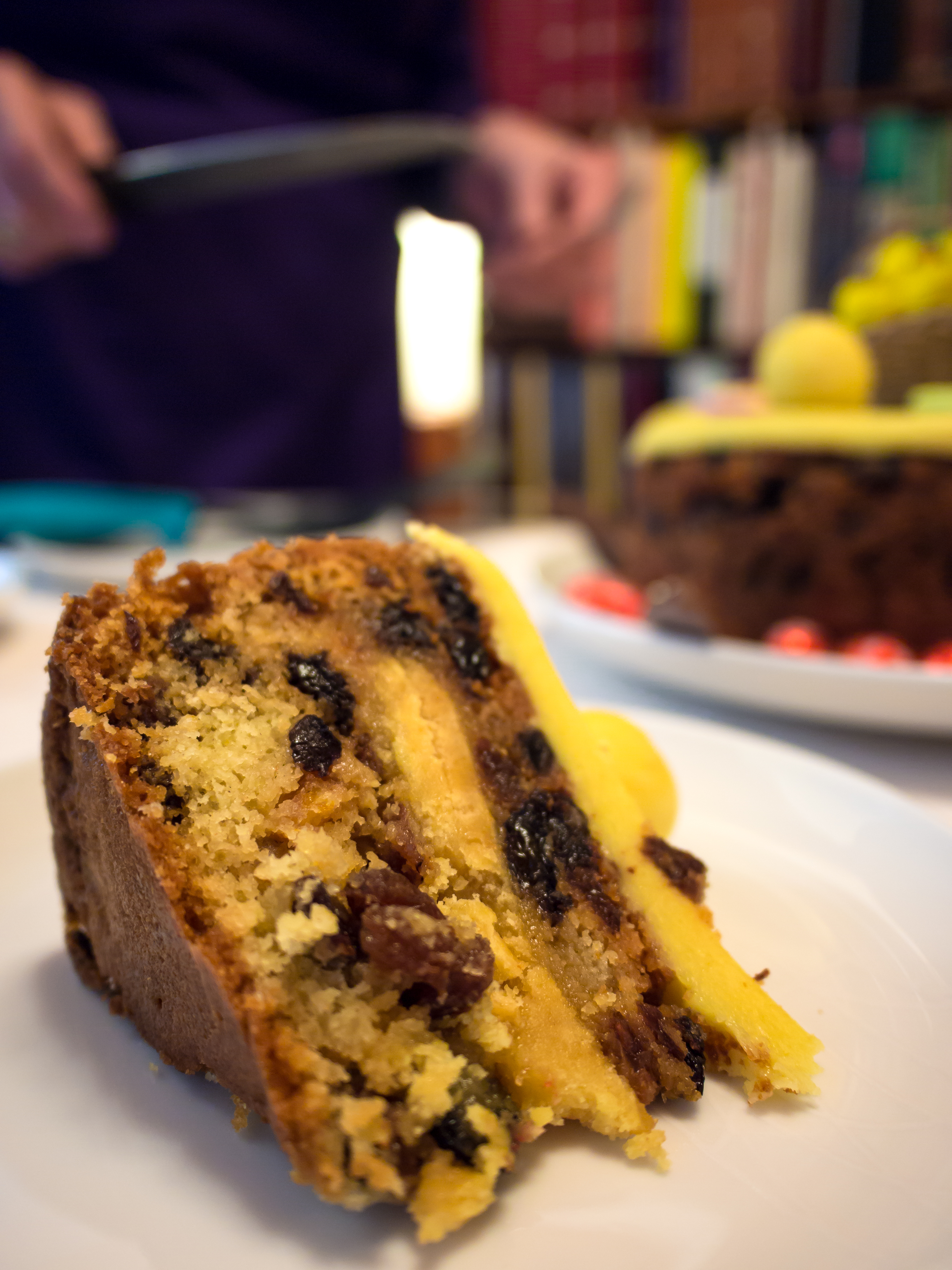
A slice of the cake showing dried fruits

Simnel cake is a light fruitcake, generally made from the following ingredients: white flour, sugar, butter, eggs, fragrant spices, dried fruits, zest and candied peel. Sometimes orange flower water or brandy is used, either in the cake batter or to flavour the almond paste. In most modern versions, marzipan or almond paste is used as a filling, with a layer laid in the middle of the mix before the cake is baked, and as decoration on top. Most recipes require at least 90 minutes of baking, and advise using several layers of baking parchment to line the tin, and sometimes brown paper wrapped around the outside to stop the marzipan burning.

== History ==
Simnel cakes have been known since at least medieval times. Bread regulations of the time suggest they were boiled and then baked, a technique which led to an invention myth, in circulation from at least 1745 until the 1930s, whereby a mythical couple, Simon and Nelly, fall out over making a Simnel. One wishes to boil it, one to bake it and, after beating each other with various household implements, they compromise on a recipe which uses both techniques.

In the United Kingdom, simnel cakes are often associated with Mothering Sunday, also known as Simnel Sunday, named after the cake. According to historian Ronald Hutton, the custom of live-in apprentices and domestic servants going home (their only day off in the year) to visit their "Mother Church" where they had been Christened, and visit their mothers (and family) on Mothering Sunday, checking that their families were well and taking food or money if needed, started in 17th Century Gloucestershire and Worcestershire. This was a time of year when food stocks were low, and the high-calorie simnel cake was useful nutrition. The cake later simply became an Easter cake.

The meaning of the word "simnel" is unclear: there is a 1226 reference to "bread made into a simnel", which is understood to mean the finest white bread, from the Latin simila, "fine flour" (from which 'semolina' also derives). John de Garlande felt that the word was equivalent to placenta cake, a cake that was intended to please.

=== Variations ===
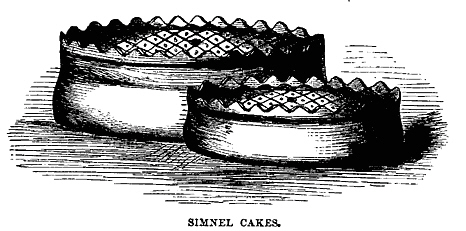
Shrewsbury simnel cake with pastry covering and crenellated decoration, 1869

Different towns had their own recipes and shapes of the simnel cake. Both Bury and Shrewsbury produced large numbers to their own recipes. Chambers Book of Days (1869) contains an illustration of the Shrewsbury Simnel cake:

It is an old custom in Shropshire and Herefordshire, and especially at Shrewsbury, to make during Lent and Easter, and also at Christmas, a sort of rich and expensive cakes, which are called Simnel Cakes. They are raised cakes, the crust of which is made of fine flour and water, with sufficient saffron to give it a deep yellow colour, and the interior is filled with the materials of a very rich plum-cake, with plenty of candied lemon peel, and other good things. They are made up very stiff; tied up in a cloth, and boiled for several hours, after which they are brushed over with egg, and then baked. When ready for sale the crust is as hard as if made of wood ... the accompanying engraving, representing large and small cakes as now on sale in Shrewsbury. The usage of these cakes is evidently one of great antiquity.

In Shrewsbury, as elsewhere in England, the Simnel cake is usually made with the Bury recipe.

== See also ==
- List of almond dishes
- List of foods with religious symbolism
- Mazurek (cake)
