= Carnival Parade of Maaseik =

Oldest carnival parade of Belgium

The Carnival Parade of Maaseik is Belgium's oldest carnival parade. The parade takes place yearly on Laetare Sunday in Maaseik, in the northeast of Belgium. The first official parade, then called Cavalcade, was in 1865.

Except during both World Wars there has been a parade every year since 1865. Since 1949 there has also been a prince carnival in the parade. It is a large parade with groups and floats from all over Belgian and Dutch Limburg as well as from North Rhine-Westphalia. The parade goes through the historical city of Maaseik and is about 2,5 km long.

== Gallery ==
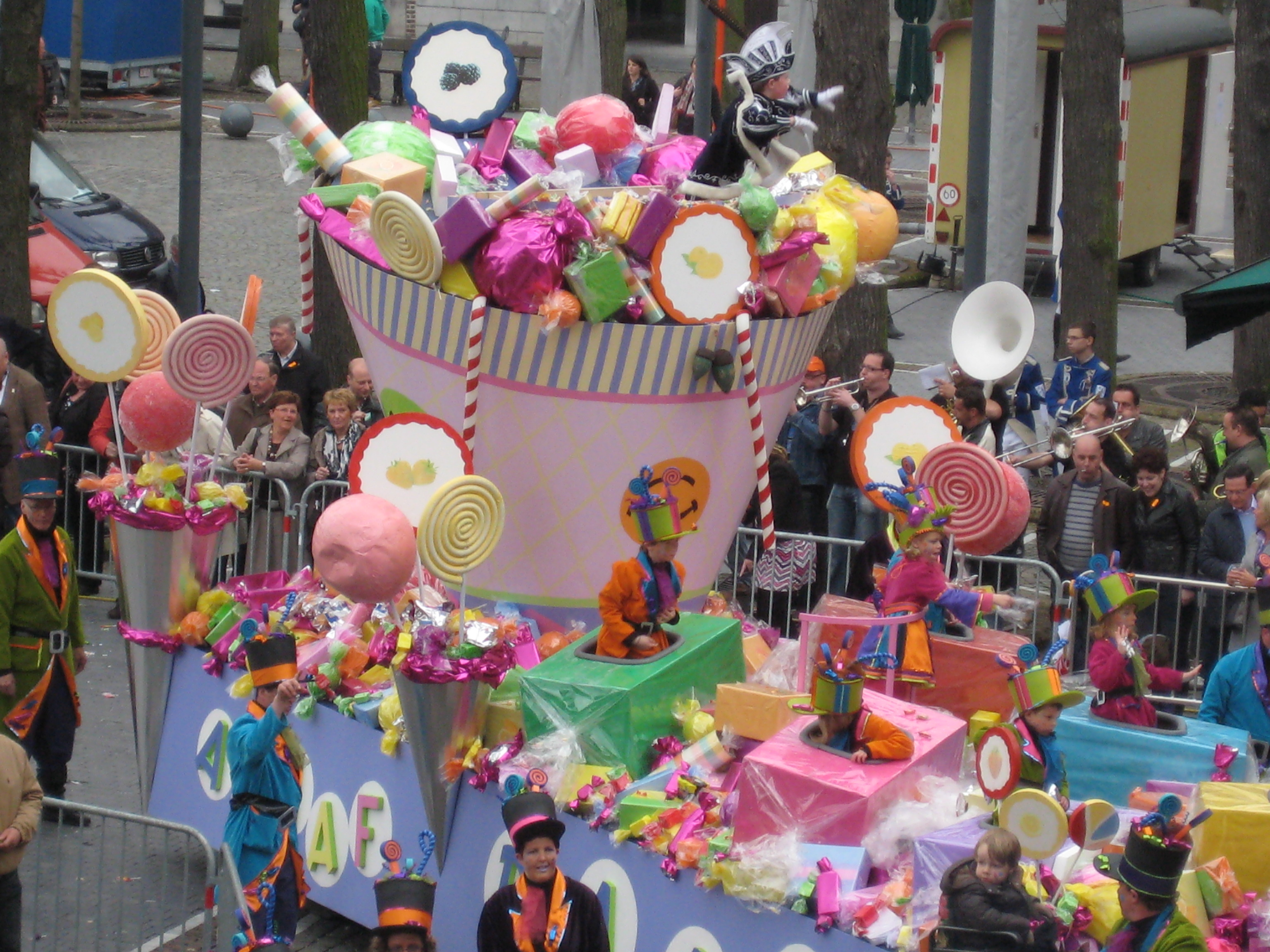
Little Prince wagon 2011

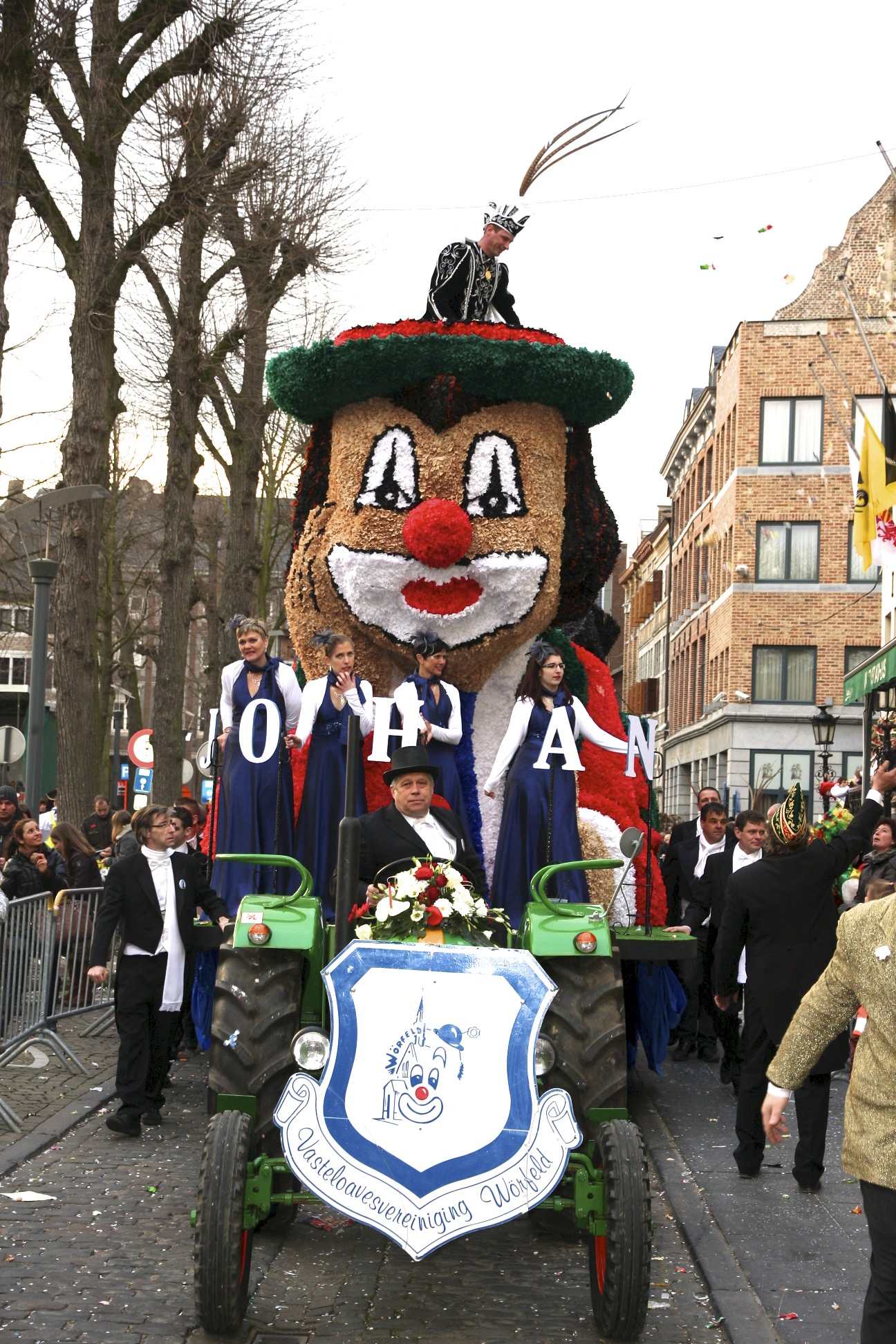
Prince wagon 2012

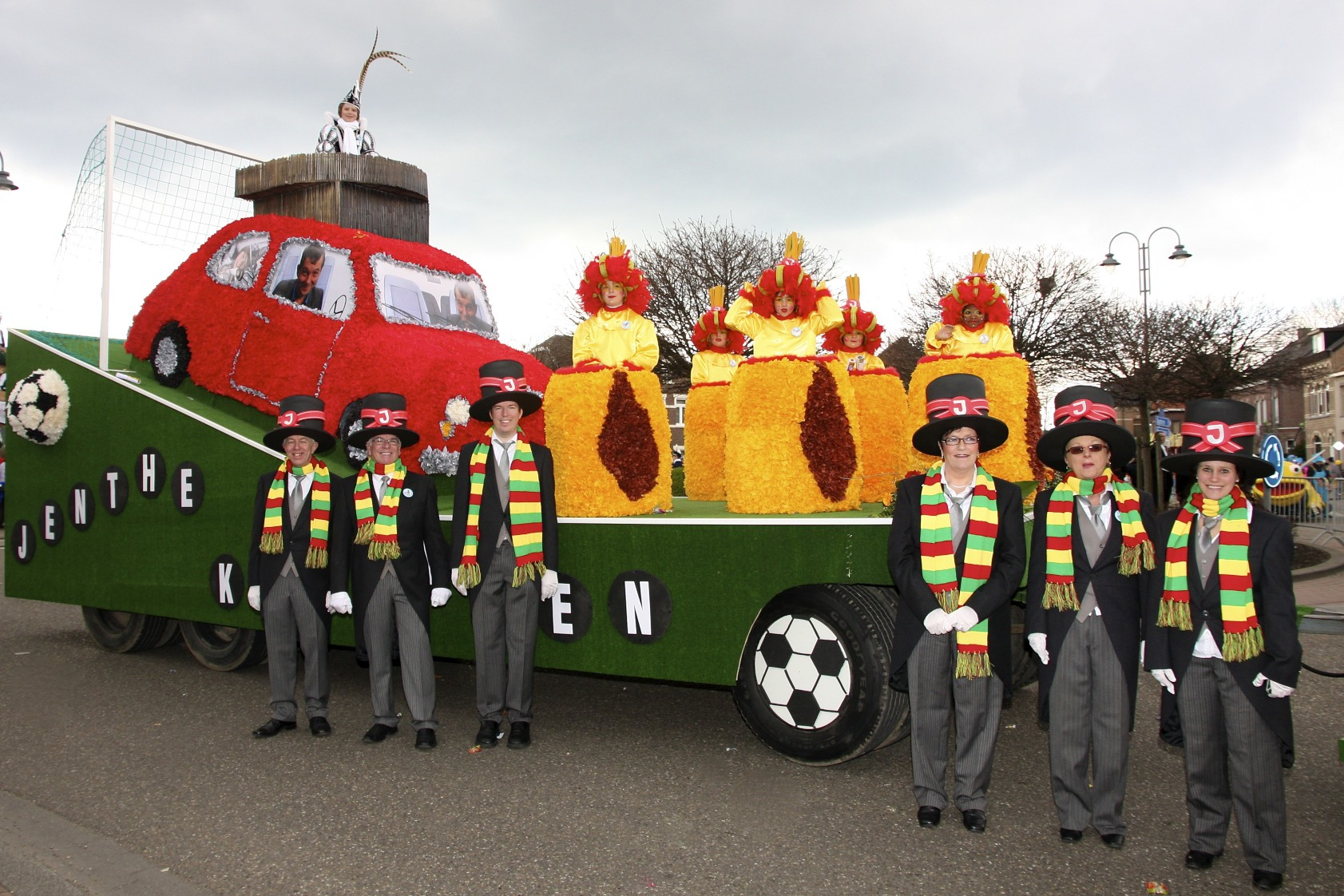
Little Prince wagon 2012

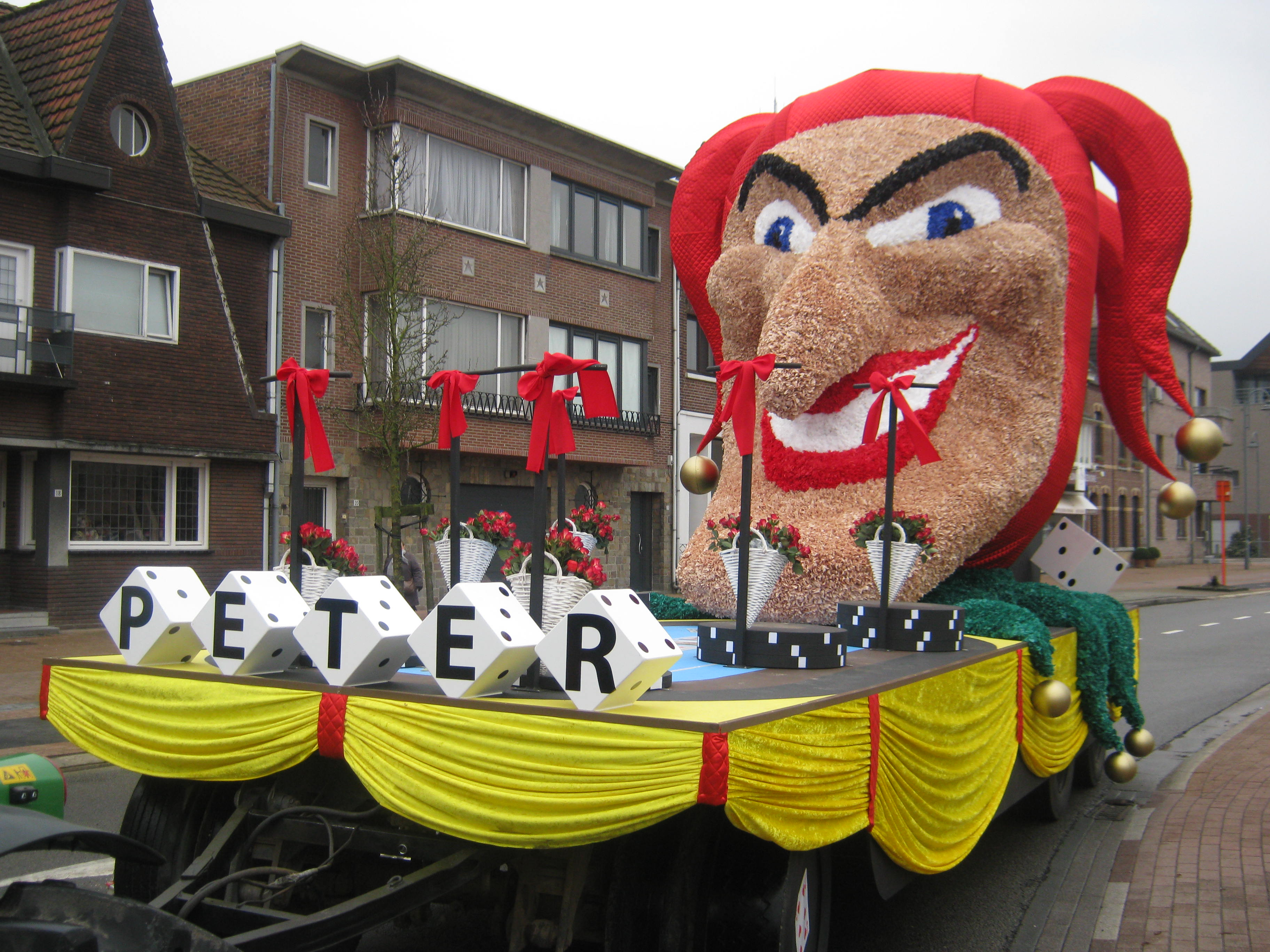
Prince wagon 2013

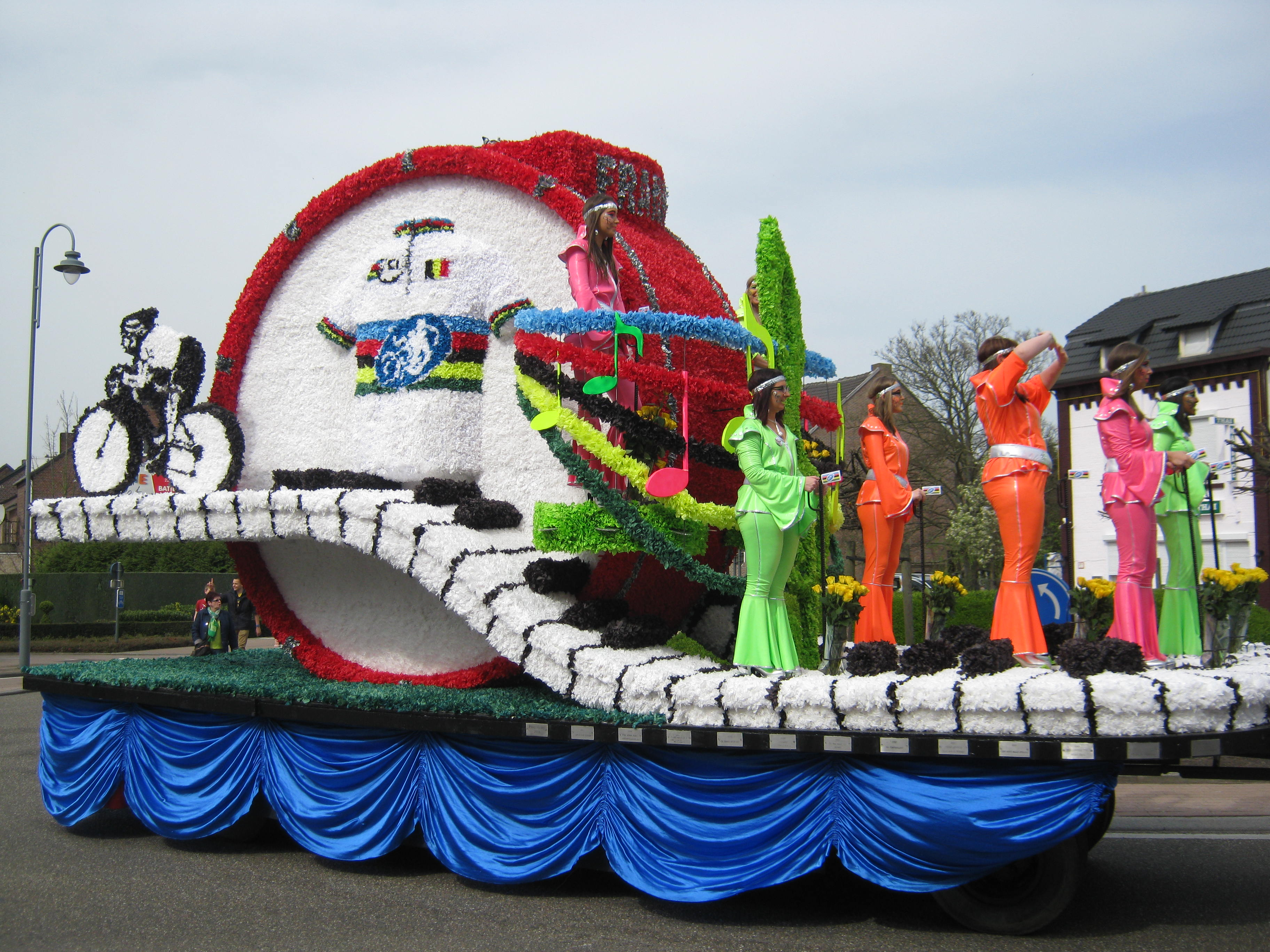
Prince wagon 2014

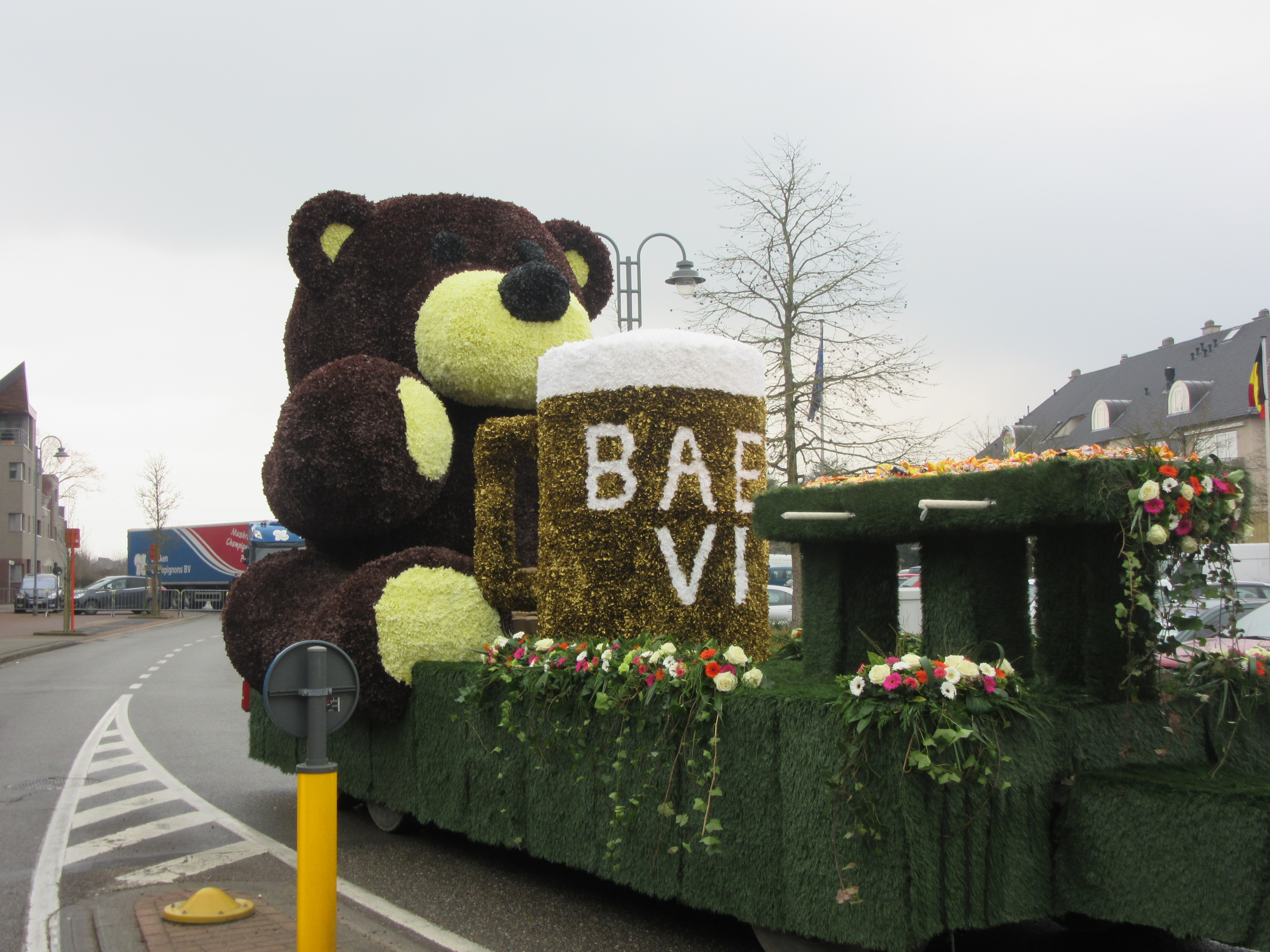
Prince wagon 2015

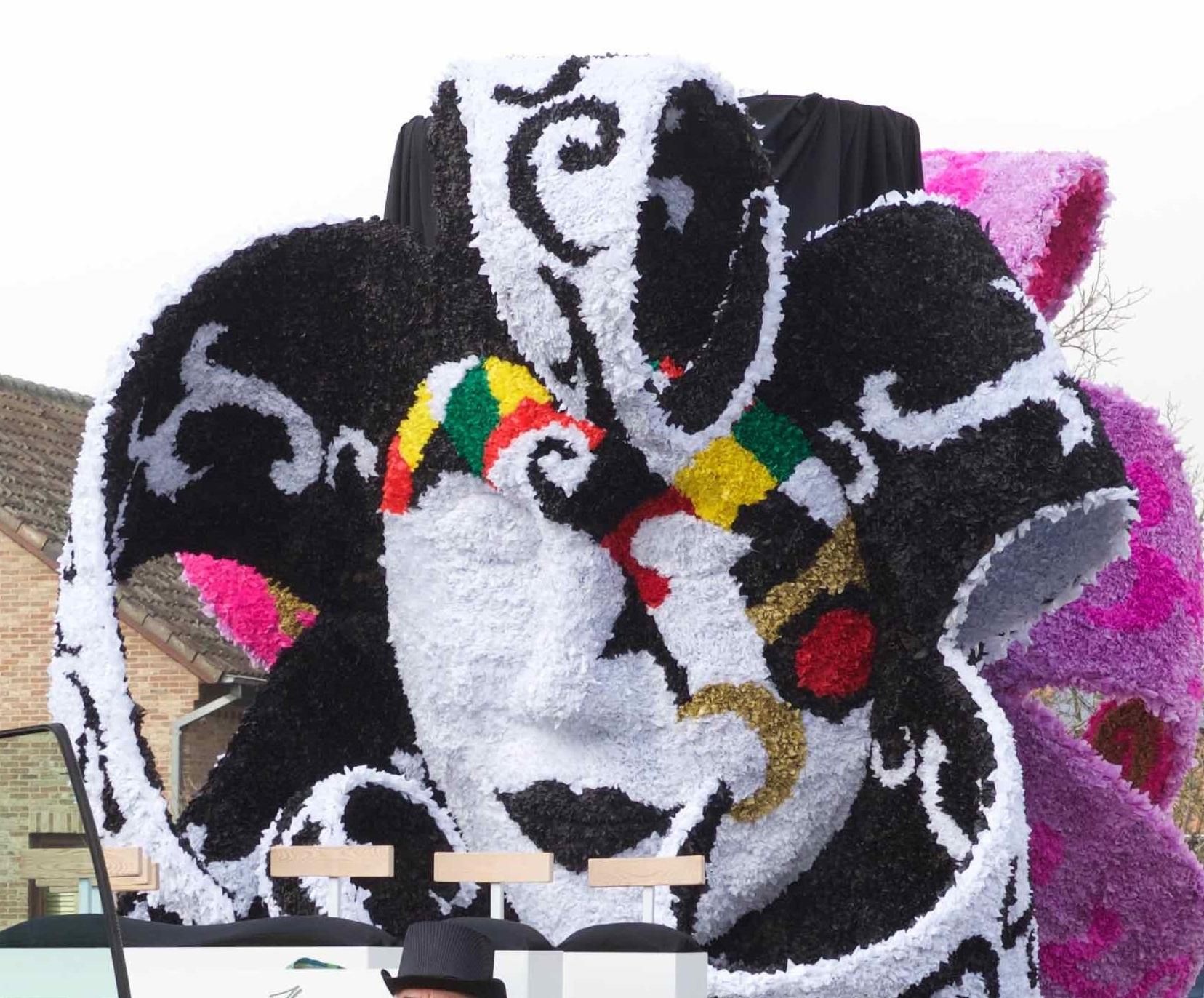
Prince wagon 2016, frontview

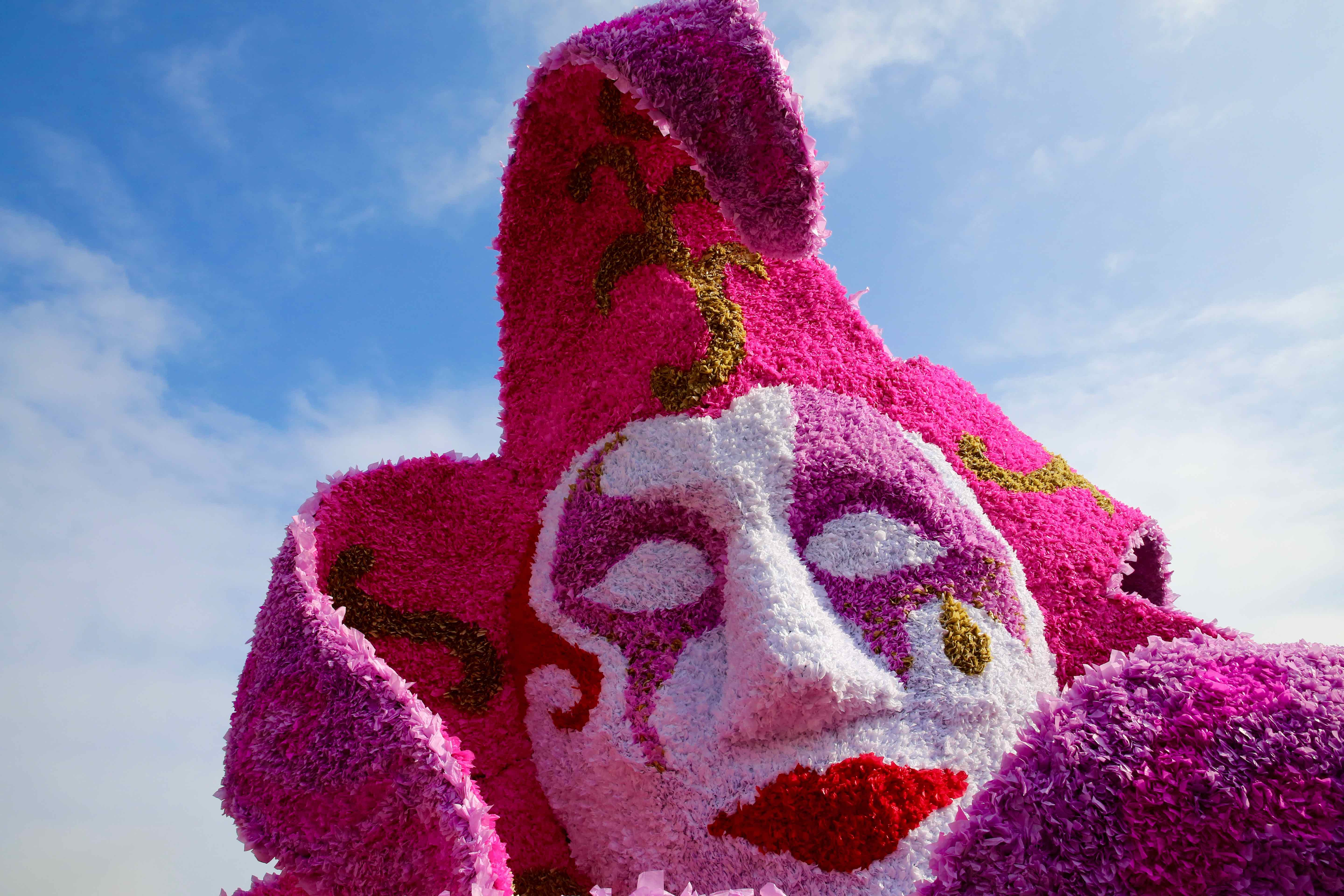
Prince wagon 2016, view from behind
