= List of foods with religious symbolism =

The list of foods with religious symbolism provides details, and links to articles, of foods which are used in religious communities or traditions to symbolise an aspect of the faith, or to commemorate a festival or hero of that faith group. Many such foods are also closely associated with a particular date or season. As with all religious traditions, some such foods have passed into widespread secular use, but all those on this list have a religious origin. The list is arranged alphabetically and by religion.

Many religions have a particular 'cuisine' or tradition of cookery, associated with their culture (see, for example, List of Jewish cuisine dishes). This list is not intended for foods which are merely part of the cultural heritage of a religious body, but specifically those foods that bear religious symbolism in the way they are made, or the way they are eaten, or both.

== Christianity ==
- St Agatha's Breasts (also Agatha Buns, or Minni di Virgini) - served on the feast day of St Agatha (5 February), the small round fruit buns are iced and topped with a cherry, intended to represent breasts. St Agatha was martyred by having her breasts cut off, for refusing to surrender her chastity and virginity to pagans. Due to this association, she has become the patron saint of bakers. Minne di Sant'Agata are a Sicilian version of the bun, made with a soft shortcrust pastry that holds a ricotta and chocolate mixture, and the same icing and cherry outer layer.
- Baklava - in Greece, it is supposed to be made with 33 dough layers, referring to the years of Christ's life.
- Bread - often (though not exclusively) unleavened bread; one of the two elements (with wine) of the Christian eucharist, the bread becomes Christ's body.
- Cattern cake - small individual cakes with caraway seeds, made on St. Catherine's Day (25 November) to celebrate St Catherine of Alexandria, and originating in Tudor times amongst the lace-makers of Nottinghamshire, England.
- Christmas carp - Associated with the Arma Christi.
- Christopsomo - a type of Tsoureki bread served at Christmas in Greece; Christmas symbols, and a cross, are traditionally incorporated into the loaf using dough shapes; it is flavoured with figs.
- Easter biscuit - associated with Easter, particularly in parts of England, often flavoured with oil of cassia as a symbol of the perfumes used in preparing Christ's body for burial.
- Easter egg - associated with Easter, as a symbol of new life.
- Fanesca - Soup eaten during Holy Week in Ecuador. It contains twelve types of beans representing the Apostles and salt cod representing Jesus Christ.
- Figs - Figs in the Bible are used prominently as symbols. In the New Testament, they are used in the parable of the budding fig tree and the parable of the barren fig tree.
- Galette des rois - a puff pastry pie filled with frangipane and commonly eaten at Epiphany in northern Europe, francophone Canada, and other locations; it is the origin of other forms of King cake (see below), and shares the same traditions, including a charm (representing an infant) baked into each pie.
- St George cake - individual fairy cakes with white icing, and a red icing cross, eaten on St George's Day (23 April).
- Hot cross bun - traditionally eaten on Good Friday after the Good Friday Liturgy, to break the fast required of Christians on that day.
- King cake - a cake or bread served at Epiphany in many Christian countries, usually having a single bean baked inside it; as the Three Kings discovered the infant Jesus after following a guiding star, so the person discovering the bean (symbolic of a swaddled infant, and in modern times sometimes replaced by a small plastic baby) figuratively shares the joy of the three kings, or symbolically becomes a king for the day.
- Koulourakia - pastry dessert served on Easter Day in parts of Greece.
- Kutia - a ceremonial grain dish with sweet gravy traditionally served mostly by Eastern Orthodox Christians and some Catholic Christians during the Christmas – Feast of Jordan holiday season or as part of a funeral feast and is an essential ritual dish at the Christmas Eve supper.
- Lammas loaf - ordinary bread, but baked using flour from the first cut of the new harvest, for the eucharist of Lammas Festival (1 August).
- Lampropsomo - a type of Tsoureki bread, flavoured with ground cherry stones, served at Easter in Greece; the name signifies the light of Christ, and red-painted hard boiled eggs are inserted as a symbol of Christ's blood (often three eggs, symbolic of the Holy Trinity).
- St. Lucia buns (St Lucy buns) - a saffron bun with raisins, also known as Lussekatter, associated with St Lucy's Day (13 December) celebrations, especially in the countries of Scandinavia.
- Michaelmas Bannock, St Michael's Bannock, or Struan Micheil is a Hebridean bread made from equal parts of barley, oats, and rye without using any metal implements.
- Michaelmas cake or St Michael cake - served at Michaelmas (29 September) this cake is identical to a butterfly cake, but the 'wings' represent angels rather than butterflies.
- Pancakes - traditionally eaten on Shrove Tuesday to symbolise the end of rich eating before Lent (which begins the following day).
- Paska - Polish and Ukrainian sweet bread baked and often blessed with other foods for consumption on Easter Sunday to mark the end of fasting.
- Pączki - eaten by Poles before Lent in order to use up all the lard, sugar, eggs and fruit in the house, because their consumption was forbidden by Christian fasting practices during the season of Lent.
- Pretzel - Southern France monks (610 AD) baked thin strips of dough into the shape of a child's arms folded in prayer. Also associated with Lent in some places.
- Religieuse - a type of éclair common in France, made to resemble a nun (which is the meaning of its name).
- St Sarkis Aghablit - salty biscuits eaten by Armenian youths (traditionally girls, but also now boys) on the eve of St Sarkis's Day to induce dreams of their future spouse, by the saint's blessing.
- St Sarkis Halva - a sweet pastry stuffed with fruit and nuts eaten in Armenian communities on St Sarkis's Day to symbolise the blessings brought by the saint.
- Simnel cake - symbolically associated with Lent and Easter and particularly Mothering Sunday (the fourth Sunday of Lent).
- Soul cake, soulmass-cake, or somas loaf - small bread-like cakes distributed on or around All Souls Day, sometimes known historically as soulmass or, by contraction, somas. The cakes commemorate the souls of the faithful departed. Once widespread in medieval England, the practice is now limited, but is also continued in a number of other nations.
- Stollen - a German fruit bread with marzipan, eaten during Advent; it recalls a special Advent tradition restricted to Germany, granted by the Pope in the so-called "butter letter" (1490).
- Święconka - a savoury meal, each element of which is symbolic, blessed in churches on Holy Saturday, and eaten on Easter Day, in Poland.
- Vasilopita - Saint Basil's or King's cake, traditionally eaten on New Year's Day in Greece. It is baked with a coin inside, and whoever finds the coin in their slice is considered blessed with good luck for the whole year.
- Wine - one of the elements of consecration used in the sacrament of the eucharist, the wine can be representative of or truly Christ's blood depending on the denomination.

== Hinduism and Buddhism ==
- Ghee - sacred food of the Devas. Burnt in the ritual of Aarti, offered to gods, and used as libation or anointment ritual.
- Modak - a sweet dumpling with a filling of fresh coconut and jaggery made specially during Ganesh Chaturthi and Vesak.
- Ghevar - a Rajasthani sweet traditionally associated with the Teej Festival.

== Islam ==
- Baklava - associated with the fasting month of Ramadan and Eid ul-Fitr by the Balkans and Ottoman Empire.
- Dates - traditionally dates are eaten at the Iftar meal to break the fast of Ramadan, symbolically recalling the tradition that the prophet Muhammad broke his fast by eating three dates.
- Halva - on the 7th and 40th days and first anniversary following the death of a Muslim, the semolina or flour helva is offered to visitors by relatives of the deceased; it is known in Turkish as “helva of the dead”. The ritual is also performed in Afghanistan, Turkey, Iran.
- Ketupat - packed rice wrapped in a woven palm leaf. Associated with Eid ul-Fitr among Muslims in Southeast Asia.
- Rendang - spicy meat dish of Minangkabau. The ingredients of the food contains symbolism of the Minangkabau culture: the chili symbolizes ulama and sharia, the meat symbolizes clan leaders, the coconut milk symbolizes teachers, spice mixture symbolizes the rest of Minangkabau society.
- Tumpeng - cone-shaped rice dish of Javanese tradition, associated with the slametan ceremony as well as the Mawlid ceremony. Syncretic in nature, also used in ceremonies of the Balinese Hindu people

== Judaism ==
- Apples and honey - eaten on Rosh Hashanah, to symbolize a sweet new year and also remind Jews of the manna provided by God to the Israelites as they wandered the desert for 40 years.
- Bread - two loaves of bread (lechem mishneh), usually braided challah, the blessing over which the Sabbath meals commence, symbolic of the double portion of manna that fell for the Israelites on the day before Sabbath during their 40 years in the desert after the Exodus from Egypt.
- Charoset - a sweet paste eaten at the Passover Seder, symbolically representing the mortar made by the Jews in Egyptian slavery.
- Cheese blintzes, cheese kreplach, cheesecake, cheese sambusak, atayef (a cheese-filled pancake), a seven-layer cake called siete cielos (seven heavens) and other dairy foods are traditionally eaten on Shavuot, and have various symbolic meanings all connected to the giving of the Torah on Mount Sinai celebrated on this holiday.
- Seven Species - Wheat, barley, dates, figs, grapes, pomegranates, and olives. They are listed in the Hebrew Bible as special agricultural products of Land of Israel and are eaten on Tu B'Shevat.
- Hamantash - a triangular pastry filled with fruit, nuts, or seeds (especially poppy seeds) and eaten at the festival of Purim, being symbolic of the ears of the defeated enemy.
- Latkes - potato pancakes, known as latkes in Yiddish, especially among Ashkenazi families, Sephardi, Polish and Israeli families eat jam-filled doughnuts (pontshkes), bimuelos (fritters) and sufganiyot, all of which are fried in oil, eaten on Hanukkah, to commemorate the miracle of a small flask of oil keeping the flame in the Temple alight for eight days.
- Maror - a bitter herb eaten at the Passover Seder meant to remind of the bitterness of slavery.
- Matzo - a type of unleavened bread eaten at the Passover Seder (and the following week), symbolically recalling the Jews leaving Egypt in too much haste to allow their bread to rise in the ovens.
- Sufganiyot - eaten on Hannukah, a fried pastry filled with sweet jelly symbolizing the miracle of oil.
- Wine (kosher) - for the recitation of kiddush at the beginning of Shabbat and Festival meals, at the Havdalah service at the conclusion of the Sabbath, and for the Seven Blessings of the wedding ceremony; also used at the Passover seder and in some other ceremonial acts, with several glasses of kosher wine required by the Haggadah ceremonial.

== Shinto ==
- Tofu - the abura-age (soybean curd) is a favourite food of the foxes associated with the deity Inari and is offered at shrines.
- Sake - It is called Omiki (Kami's Sake). It is offered together with an offering called shinsen.
- Mochi - the Kagami mochi is used in Japanese New Year ceremonies; in different traditions and regions it can symbolise good luck or long life.

== Taoism and Chinese Folk Religion ==
- Dumpling - symbolizes wealth because the shape is similar to money-related instruments such as the tael (Chinese weight measure) or Chinese ingots (especially the jau gok). They are eaten at midnight of Chinese New Year.
- Mooncake - Eaten for Mid-Autumn Festival. Dedicated to the Goddess Chang' E.
- Noodle - symbolizes longevity, usually served in the Chinese New Year’s Eve.
- Peach - Due to the Peaches of Immortality having an association with longevity, peaches are common decorations on pastries in China. In addition, Taoists have historically consumed peaches in elixirs of life in search of immortality.

== See also ==
- List of foods
