= Constance Adelaide Smith =

Reviver of Mothering Sunday (1878–1938)

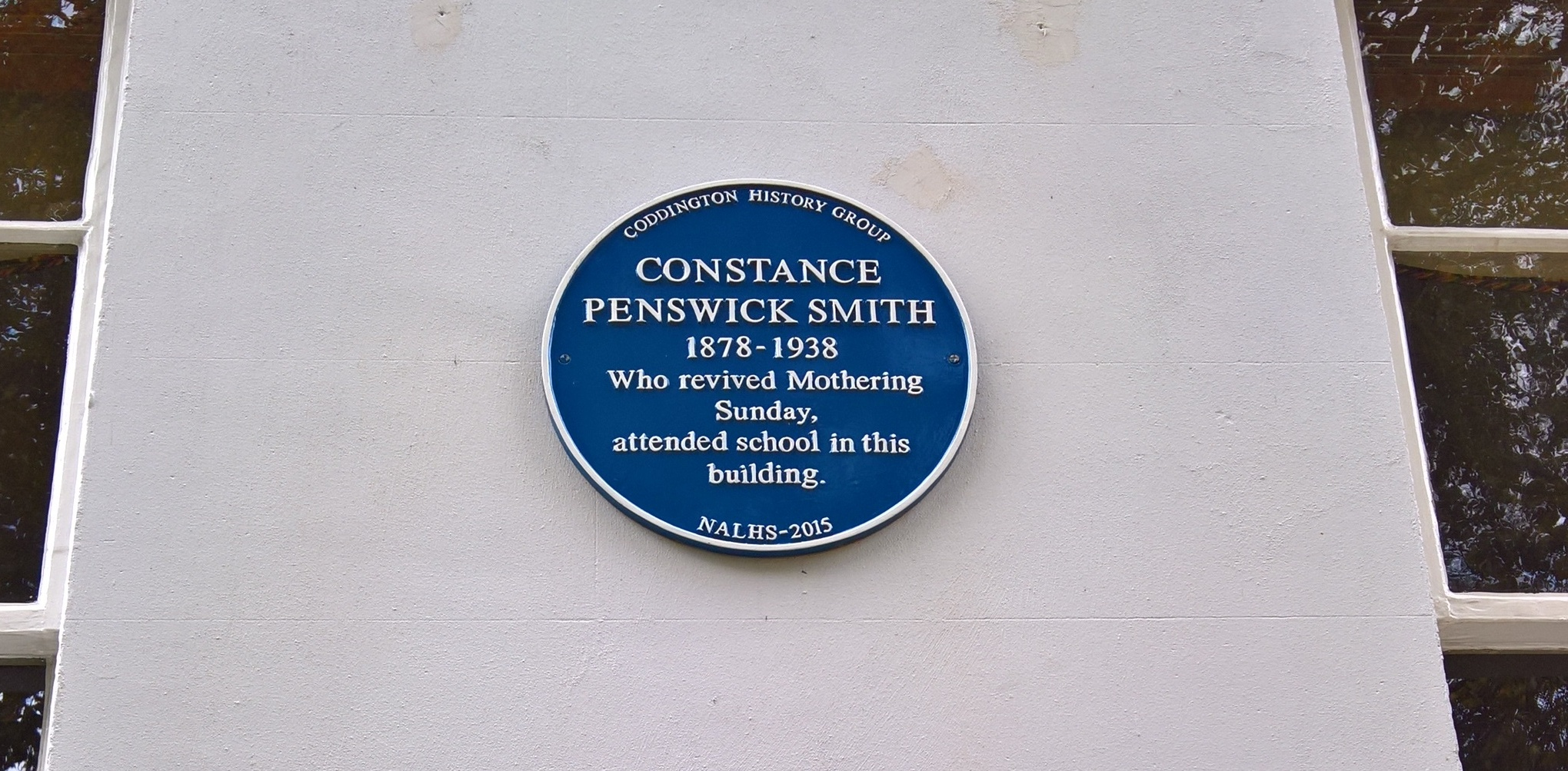
Blue Plaque for Constance Penswick Smith. Located on Church Walk, Newark on Trent, England

Constance Adelaide Smith (28 April 1878 – 10 June 1938, published under the pseudonym C. Penswick Smith) was an Englishwoman responsible for the reinvigoration of Mothering Sunday in the British Isles in the 1910s and 1920s.

== Biography ==
Smith was born in Dagnall, Buckinghamshire. She was one of seven children of the Anglican clergyman, Charles Penswick Smith, who was vicar of Dagnall at the time of her birth and was vicar of Coddington, Nottinghamshire from 1890 to his death in 1922. She was a High Church Anglican, and all four of her brothers became Anglican priests.

The details of her early life are not clear, but she worked as a governess in Germany in the late 19th century. By 1901 she was a dispenser of medicines at the Hospital for Skin Diseases in Nottingham. She was a dispenser at the Girls' Friendly Society lodge in Regent Street, Nottingham from 1909.

Smith was inspired by a newspaper article in 1913, on the plans of Anna Jarvis, an American woman from Philadelphia, who hoped to introduce Mother's Day in the USA. In 1914, US President Woodrow Wilson made a proclamation establishing the second Sunday of May as the official date for the observance of a national day to celebrate mothers.

Smith instead linked this concept to the Mothering Sunday, traditionally observed in the Anglican liturgical calendar on the fourth Sunday of Lent. She published a play, In Praise of Mother: A story of Mothering Sunday (1913), as well as A Short History of Mothering Sunday (1915), which went through several editions. Her most influential booklet was The Revival of Mothering Sunday (1921). She advocated for Mothering Sunday as a day for recognizing Mother Church, 'mothers of earthly homes', Mary, mother of Jesus, and Mother Nature, basing her work on medieval traditions.

With Ellen Porter, a colleague from the Girls' Friendly Society lodge, Smith established a movement to promote Mothering Sunday, collecting and publishing information about the day and its traditional observance throughout the UK. This included research into local traditions, such as the making of simnel and wafer cakes. The movement established Mothering Sunday as a widely observed day throughout the British Empire; by the time of her death, the day was said to be observed in every parish in Britain, and every country in the British Empire.

Smith never married and had no children. She died in Nottingham in 1938 from acute tonsillitis and streptococcal cellulitis of the neck. She was buried in Coddington churchyard beside her father on the left hand side of the main path walking up to the church. White marble crosses and bases hold their inscriptions and are easily visible. The lady chapel at All Saints', Coddington was dedicated to her memory in 1951.
