= Cassatella di sant'Agata =

Traditional pastry from Catania, Italy

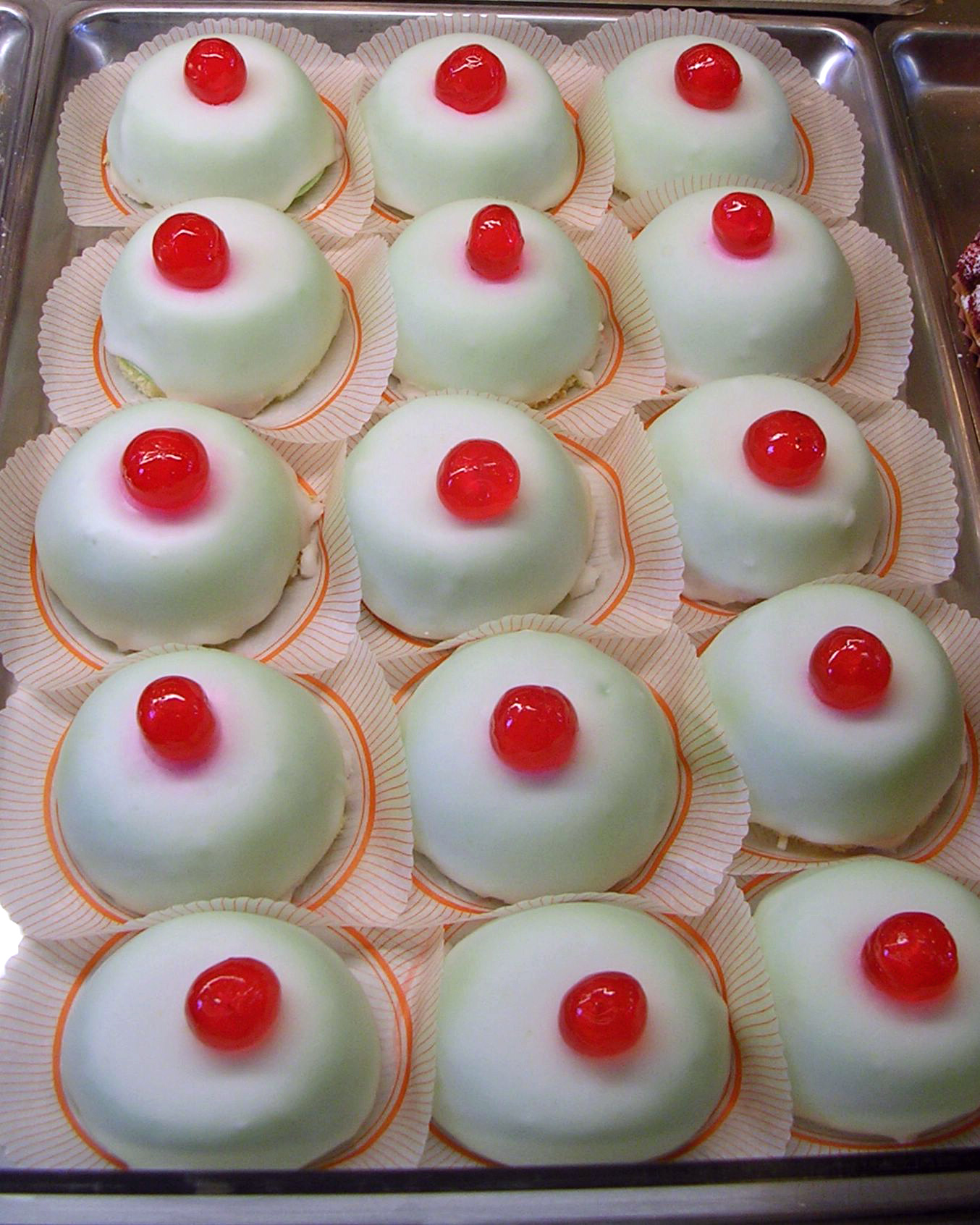
- Place of origin: Italy
- Region or state: Sicily
- Main ingredients: Sponge cake, fruit juice or liqueur, ricotta, candied peel, marzipan, icing

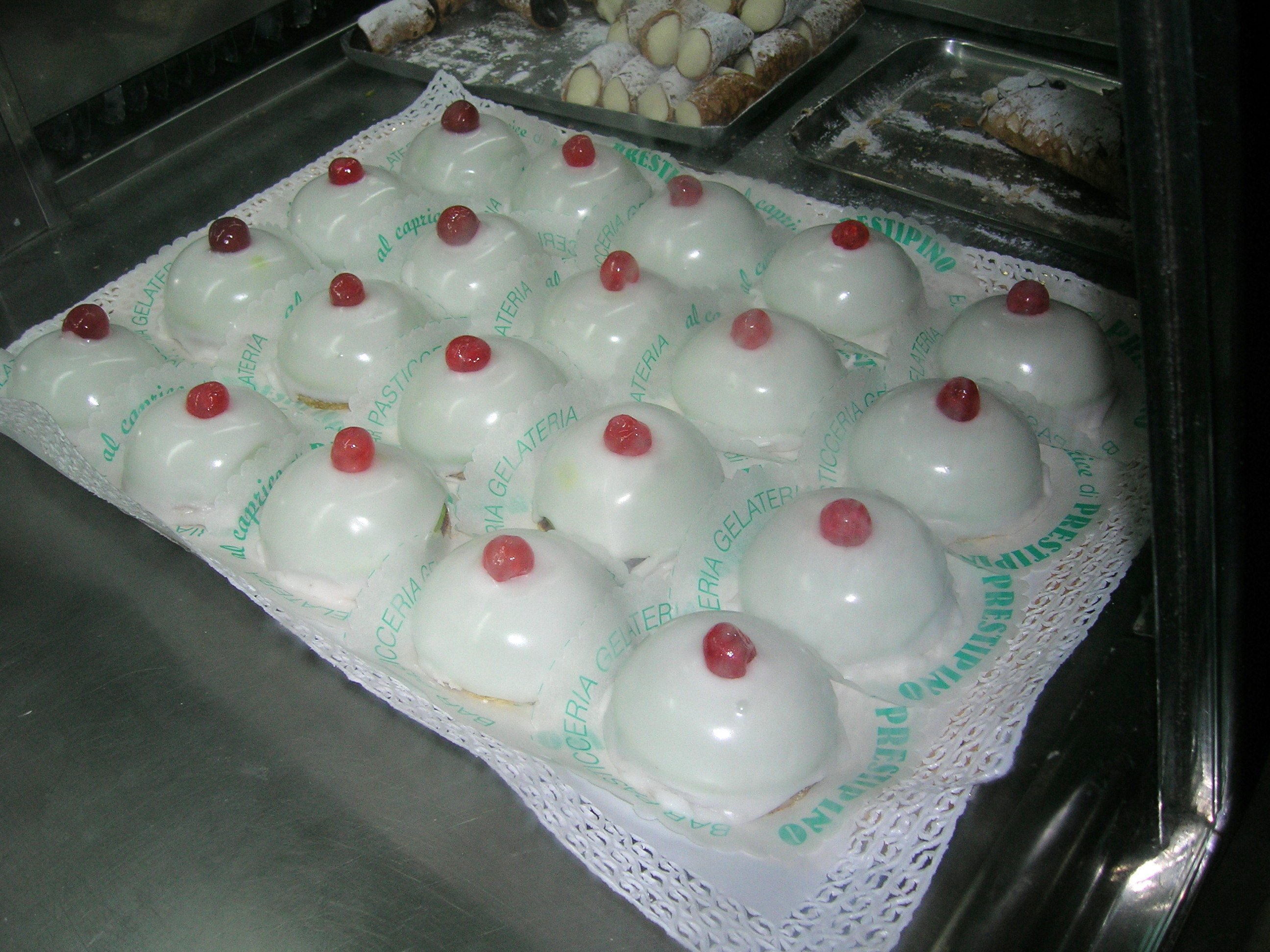
A tray of cassatelle di sant'Agata

Cassatella di sant'Agata (Sicilian: minnuzzi 'i sant'Àjita, lit. 'Saint Agatha's breasts') is a traditional Sicilian pastry from Catania made during the Festival of Saint Agatha, held from February 3rd to February 5th each year.

== Description ==
The cakes are shaped like breasts to honor Saint Agatha, the patron saint of Catania, a Catholic martyr who was tortured by having her breasts cut off with pincers. Saint Agatha had taken a vow of virginity and refused to marry the Roman prefect Quintianus, who reported her to the authorities for being a Christian during the Decian persecution.

Cassatelle di sant'Agata are round-shaped sweets made with sponge cake soaked in rosolio and filled with ricotta, chocolate drops, and candied fruit, such as oranges or citrons. The outside is covered in white icing and finished with a candied cherry on top. The ricotta is made strictly from sheep's milk.

== See also ==
- Sicilian cuisine
- List of Italian desserts and pastries
- List of foods with religious symbolism
- List of cakes
- Cassata
