= Saint Catherine's Day =

Religious feast day

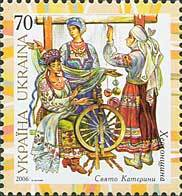
- Date: 25 November
- Next time: 25 November 2026
- Frequency: Annual

Saint Catherine's Day, also called the Feast of Saint Catherine or Catterntide, is 25 November. It has retained its popularity throughout the centuries. It commemorates the martyrdom of Saint Catherine of Alexandria, one of the Fourteen Holy Helpers.

== Historical meaning ==
According to traditional accounts, St Catherine was beheaded by Emperor Maximinus II around 305 AD in Alexandria. 25 November became the commemoration date in the 10th century, and many churches and particularly nunneries in Europe were dedicated to St Catherine. In Lutheran countries, this day has also been associated with Catherine of Aragon, the first wife of Henry VIII.

Like St Martin's Day on 11 November, St Catherine's Day also marks the arrival of winter. Also like St Martin's Day, St Catherine's Day is mainly a secular holiday. The two days differ in that St Martin's Day is primarily a holiday associated with men and St Catherine's Day is associated with women.

== Customs ==
=== Great Britain ===
During the medieval period, Saint Catherine's Day marked the beginning of Advent in England.

Catterntide was celebrated by lacemakers. A traditional celebration of St Catherine's Day, which has seen something of a revival in modern times, is the baking of symbolic 'Cattern Cakes' in honour of St Catherine. The rise of the internet has assisted in this process, as recipes have become more readily available. The key ingredients are bread dough, egg, sugar, lard or butter, and caraway seeds.

The custom of lighting a revolving pyrotechnic display (a 'Catherine Wheel firework') to celebrate the saint's feast day is assisted by the ready supply of such fireworks during the month of November, due to the secular celebration of Guy Fawkes Night earlier in the month.

=== Canada ===
In Quebec and elsewhere in French Canada, St. Catherine's Day is a special day celebrating "spinsters". Following French tradition, this celebration was seen as the last opportunity for women over 25 still single to present themselves to men still available to find themselves a suitable husband. The women would wear a certain distinctive headdress.

Over the centuries, as Quebec modernized, the age was increased to 30 years after the Quiet Revolution. According to the current tradition and rules of proper etiquette still in place today, French Canadian women passed 30 must forgo the idea of having a big wedding as many young Quebec girls dreamt of and must wear a sober dress covering arms and collarbones. Although a trend exists to raise the age to 35, it remains highly frowned upon for women over 30, and certainly those from good families, to hold large weddings and celebrations. This is also why today many Quebec women leave aside the tradition of a grand wedding and decide instead to buy a house and start a family as a sign of commitment to their partner.

St. Catherine's taffy is a candy made by French Canadian girls to honor St. Catherine, the patron saint of unmarried women on her feast day. St. Catherine's Day is sometimes known in among French-Canadians as "taffy day", a day when marriage-age girls would make taffy for eligible boys. Saint Marguerite Bourgeoys, a founder of the Notre-Dame de Montréal and an early teacher in Ville-Marie, the colonial settlement that would later become Montreal, is credited with starting the tradition as a way of keeping the attention of her young pupils by placing the taffy on the path in front of her school leading to the door way.

=== Estonia ===
In Estonia, five parish churches and at least as many chapels have been dedicated to St. Catherine. St. Catherine's Day (Estonian: kadripäev) is still widely celebrated in modern-day Estonia. It marks the arrival of winter and is one of the more important and popular autumn days in the Estonian folk calendar. It is a day of celebration for the women of the culture. The customs for the Estonian St. Catherine's Day are generally associated with the kadrisants (kadri beggars) or kadris, which give the whole day a unique quality, although it is similar to the traditions practised on St. Martin's Day. Both require dressing up and going from door to door on the eve of the holiday to collect gifts, such as food, cloth and wool, in return for suitable songs and blessings.

As with mardi eve (the evening before St. Martin's Day), when the village youth chose a mardiisa (father), the main player on kadri eve is kadriema (mother).

On Estonian farms, minding the herds and flocks were primarily the responsibility of women and therefore, St. Catherine's Day involves customs pertaining more to herd keeping than farming. In addition, both men and women may dress up as women. In comparison to the mardisants, who were generally dressed in a masculine and rough manner and often wore animal masks, the kadris wear clean and light-coloured clothing, which is in reference to the coming snow.

Regarding the songs for St. Martin's Day and St. Catherine's Day, the main content difference is that the former songs wished the visited families harvest luck and the latter songs luck with the herds and flocks, particularly with the sheep. Sheep shearing was not allowed from Martinmas to St. Catherine's Day, because then the sheep would not mature.

On St. Catherine's Day, in order to protect the sheep, shearing and weaving were forbidden and sewing and knitting were also occasionally banned.

St. Catherine's Day has retained its popularity throughout the centuries, including the half-century of Soviet occupation, during which no direct official obstructions to the celebrations were made, probably due to the apolitical nature of the holiday. Thus, St. Catherine's Day is still widely celebrated in modern-day Estonia. It is particularly popular among students and the rural population.

=== France ===
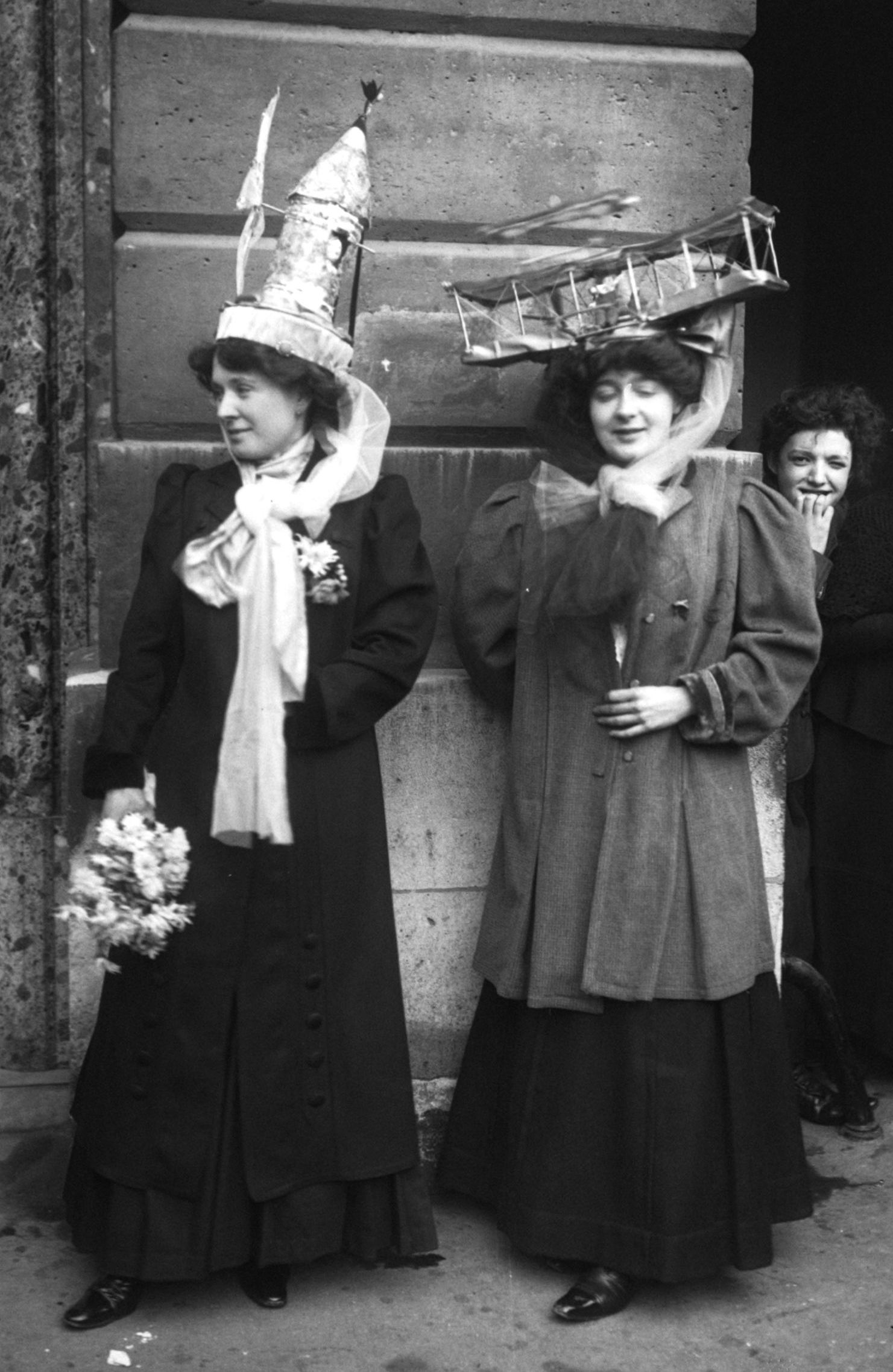
Two Catherinettes in Paris in 1909

On St Catherine's Day, it is customary for unmarried women to pray for husbands, and to honour women who have reached 25 years of age but have not married—called "Catherinettes" in France. Catherinettes send postcards to each other, and friends of the Catherinettes make hats for them—traditionally using the colours yellow (faith) and green (wisdom), often outrageous—and crown them for the day. Pilgrimage is made to St Catherine's statue, and she is asked to intercede in finding husbands for the unmarried lest they "don St. Catherine's bonnet" and become spinsters. The Catherinettes are supposed to wear the hat all day long, and they are usually feted with a meal among friends. Because of this hat-wearing custom, French milliners have big parades to show off their wares on this day.

The French say that before a girl reaches 25, she prays:

""Donnez-moi, Seigneur, un mari de bon lieu! Qu'il soit doux, opulent, libéral et agréable!"

(Lord, give me a well-situated husband. Let him be gentle, rich, generous, and pleasant!")

After 25, she prays:

""Seigneur, un qui soit supportable, ou qui, parmi le monde, au moins puisse passer!"

(Lord, one who is bearable, or who can at least pass as bearable in the world!")

And when she is approaching 30:

"Un tel qu'il te plaira Seigneur, je m'en contente!"

("Send whoever you want, Lord; I'll be happy!").

An English version goes, St Catherine, St Catherine, O lend me thine aid, And grant that I never may die an old maid.

And there is this, a fervent French prayer:

Sainte Mia, soyez bonne
Nous n'avons plus d'espoir
qu'en vous
Vous êtes notre patronne
Ayez pitié de nous
Nous vous implorons à genoux
Aidez-nous à nous marier
Pitié, donnez-nous un époux
Car nous brûlons d'aimer
Daignez écouter la prière
De nos cœurs fortement épris
Oh, vous qui êtes notre mère
Donnez-nous un mari

Saint Catherine, be good
We have no more hope
but in you
You are our protector
Have pity on us
We implore you on our knees
Help us to get married
For pity's sake, give us a husband
For we're burning with love
Deign to hear the prayer
Which comes from our overburdened hearts
Oh you who are our mother
Give us a husband

=== United States ===
In keeping with its French heritage, New Orleans has inaugurated a hat parade to celebrate the patron saint of milliners, seamstresses and single women. Inspired by the annual event of the same name in Vesoul, French city in the East of France, it is held the weekend before Thanksgiving.

== Media ==
A New Kind of Love (1963) references St. Catherine's day demonstrating the parades and millinery demonstrations in Paris, France.

Gene Wolfe's The Book of the New Sun makes reference to the Feast of Holy Katharine, as an annual banquet celebrated by the torturers' guild that includes allusions to the real-world holiday, including a "great spiked wheel".

The Blue Nile have a song called "St. Catherine's Day", released on the collector's edition of their début album, A Walk Across the Rooftops.
