= Cassata =

Type of sponge cake

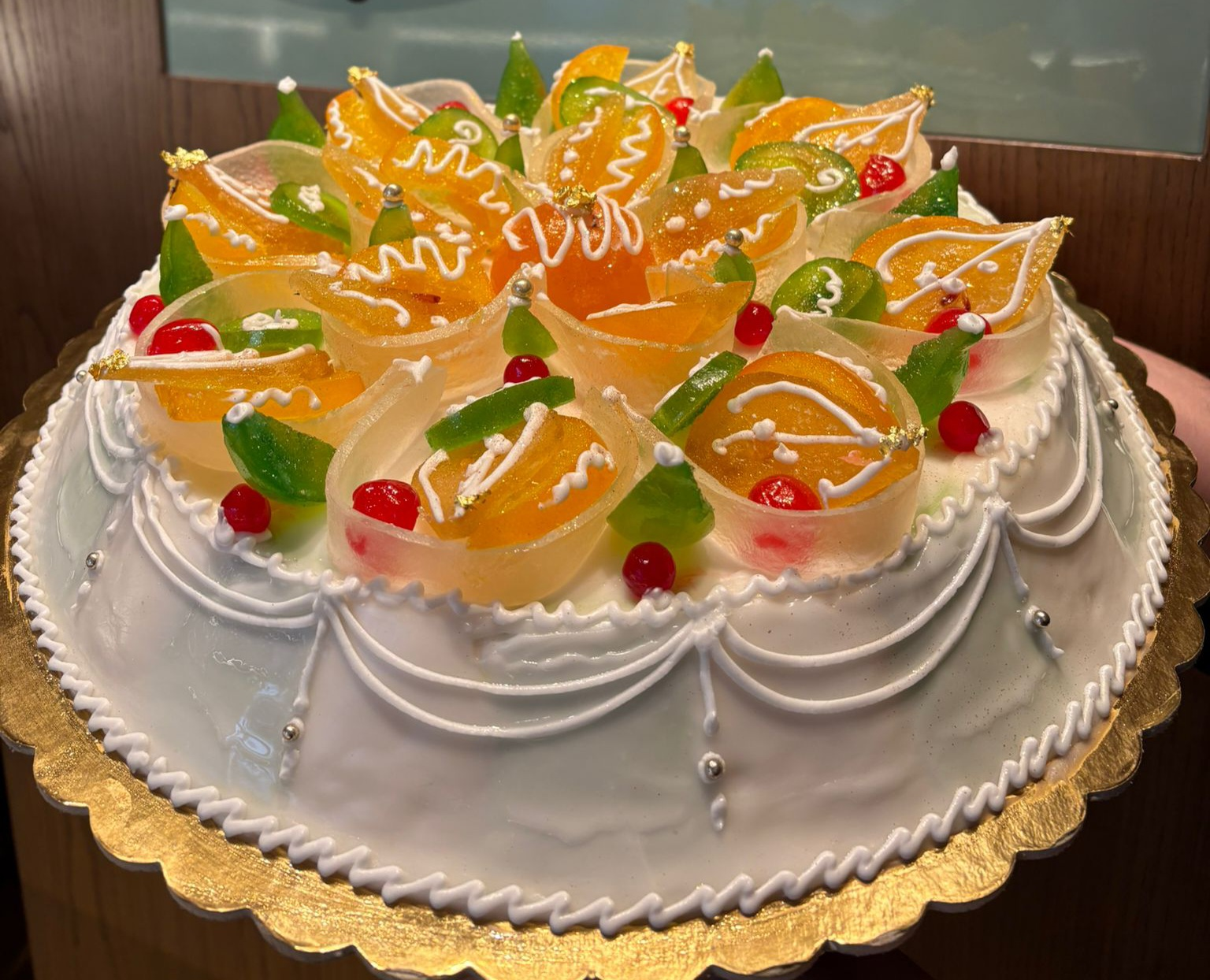
- Alternative names: Cassata siciliana
- Place of origin: Italy
- Region or state: Sicily
- Main ingredients: Sponge cake, fruit juice or liqueur, ricotta, candied peel, marzipan, icing
- Variations: Cassata al forno ('in oven'), cassatella di sant'Agata

Cassata (/kəˈsɑːtə/ kə-SAH-tə) or cassata siciliana (Italian: [kasˈsaːta sitʃiˈljaːna]; Sicilian: [ka(s)ˈsaːta sɪʃɪˈljaːna]) is an Italian cake originating in the Sicily region. It is typically composed of a round sponge cake moistened with fruit juices or liqueur and layered with ricotta cheese and candied fruit (a filling also used with cannoli). It has a shell of marzipan, pink and green colored icing, and decorative designs. Cassata may also refer to a Neapolitan ice cream containing candied or dried fruit and nuts.

== Origin ==
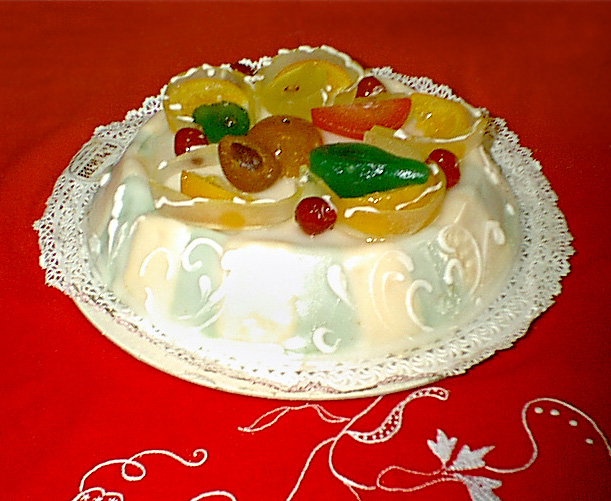
Cassata

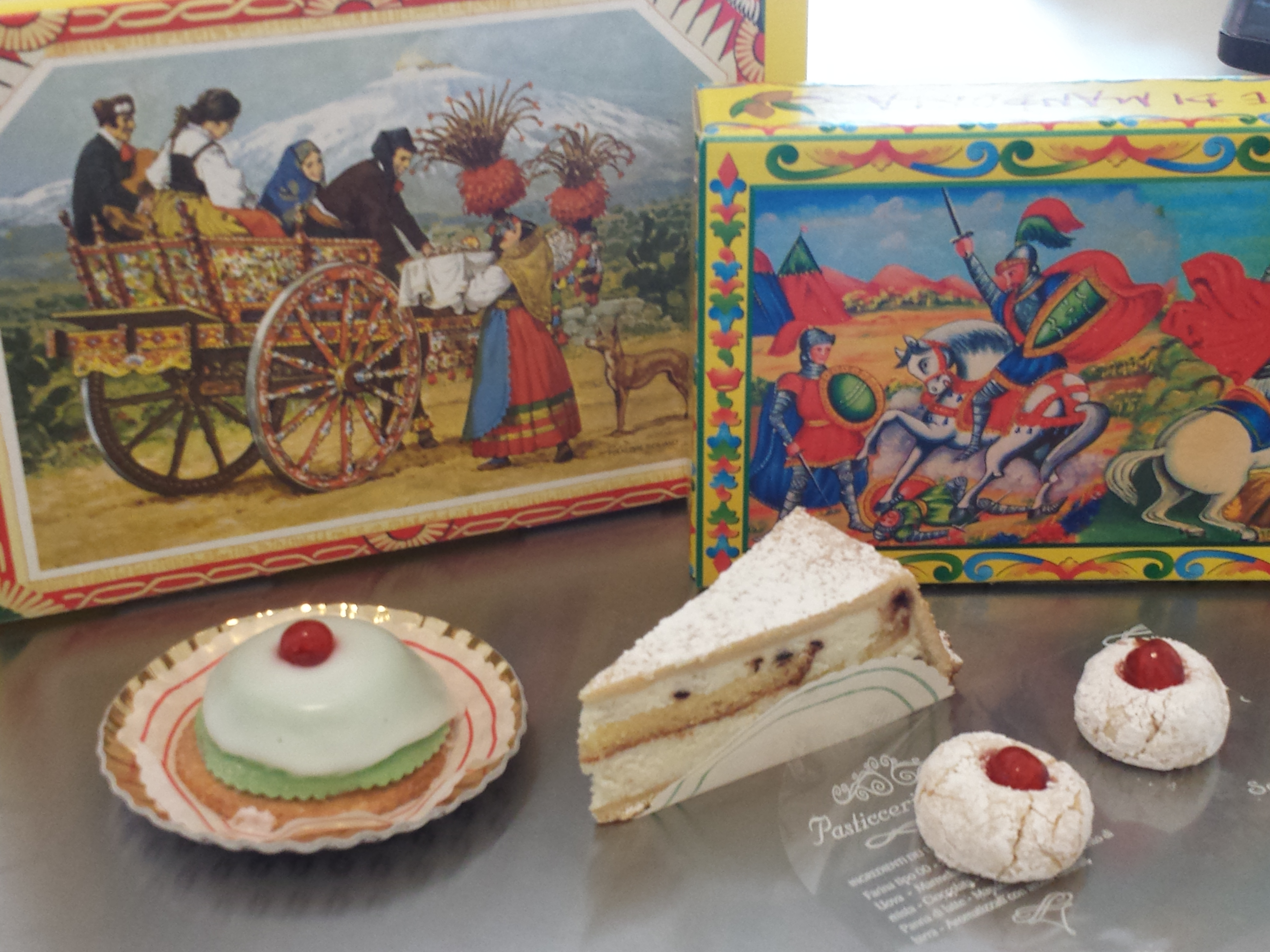
A slice of cassata al forno, almond pastries (right), and a cassatina siciliana (left)

Cassata is believed to have originated in Palermo in the 10th century, when under Emirate of Sicily. The word al-qaššāṭī—القشاطي (Arabic for 'the cassata-maker')—was first mentioned in Corleone in 1178.

The Arabic word qas'ah, from which cassata may derive, refers to the bowl that is used to shape the cake.

== Variations ==
=== In Italy ===
Unlike the round, traditional shapes of cassata are made in the form of a rectangle, square, or box. The word box in Italian is cassa, although it is unlikely that the word cassata originated from this term.

Cassata catanese, as it is often prepared in the Sicilian province of Catania, is made similar to a pie, containing a top and bottom crust, filled with ricotta cheese, and baked in the oven.

Cassatella di sant'Agata is a similar dessert, but made in a smaller, personal-serving size, with a candied cherry on top, and often a specifically green-colored marzipan. It is typically made in Catania for the festival of Saint Agatha. The allusion to the female breast relates the specific torture Saint Agatha faced as a Catholic martyr.

When a cassata is made, layers of gelato can be substituted for the layers of cheese, producing a dessert similar to an ice cream cake. The version of the recipe followed in Messina is less sweet than the one used in Palermo.

=== In the US ===
While there are bakeries in the US making cassata, in Cleveland, Ohio, and the surrounding region, the term "cassata cake" uniquely refers to a layered yellow sponge cake soaked in rum or rum syrup, filled with fresh strawberries and custard, and usually decorated with whipped cream and sliced strawberries. This Cleveland cake with the name cassata first appeared in the early 1920s at LaPuma Spumoni & Bakery.

In Utica, New York, the term cassata typically refers to cassata al forno, a baked ricotta cake.

=== In India ===
In India, the term cassata refers to a dessert with multiple layers of ice cream (similar to Neapolitan ice cream), on top of a layer of sponge cake, topped with nuts.

== See also ==
Media related to Cassata at Wikimedia Commons

- List of Italian desserts and pastries
- List of cakes
- Tipsy cake
- Trifle
- Cassatella di sant'Agata
