= Mazurek (cake) =

Polish Easter cake

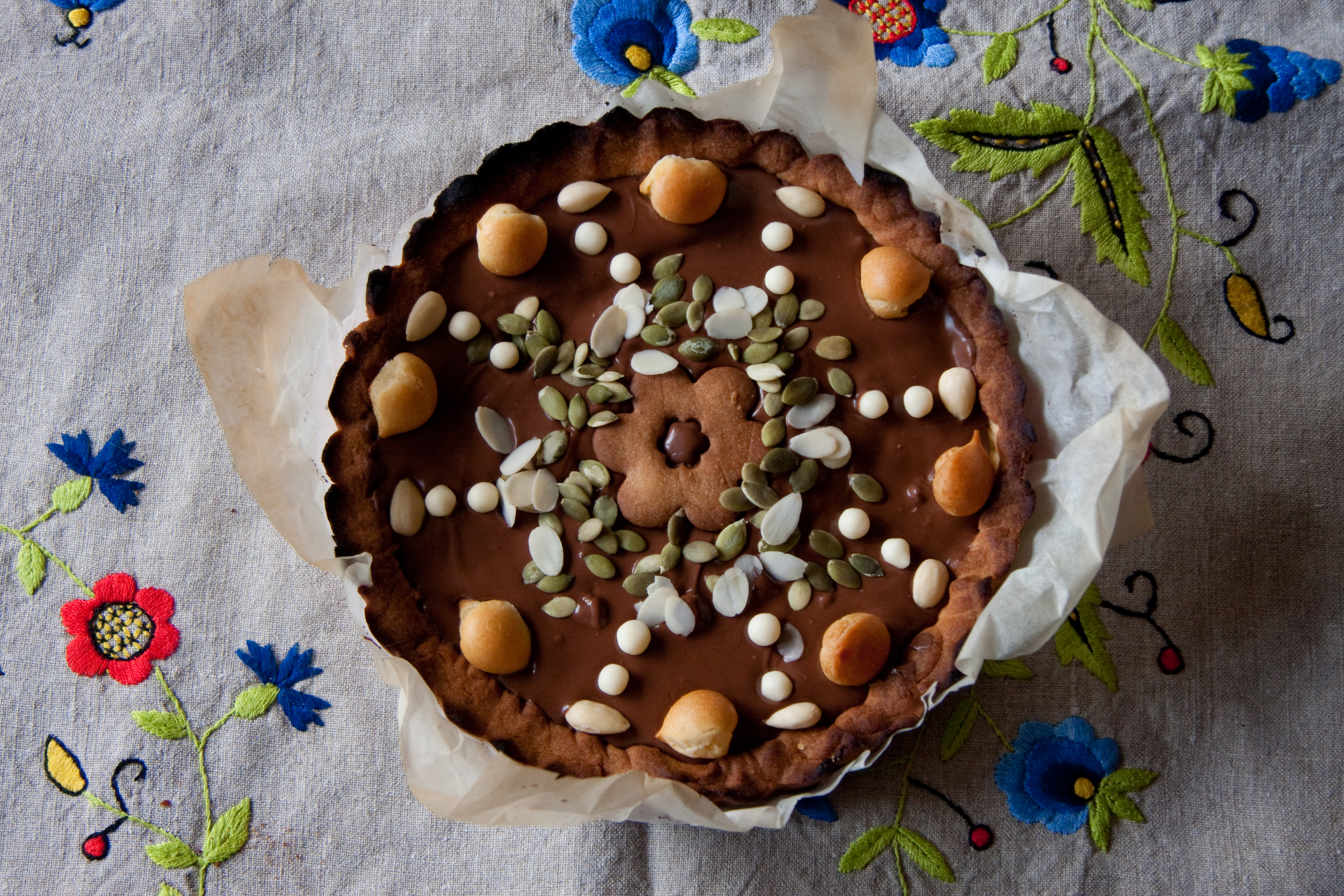
- Traditional home-made mazurek
- Alternative names: Easter shortcake
- Type: Pastry
- Place of origin: Poland
- Serving temperature: Room
- Main ingredients: flour, sugar, butter or margarine, eggs, icing, candied or dried fruits, nuts

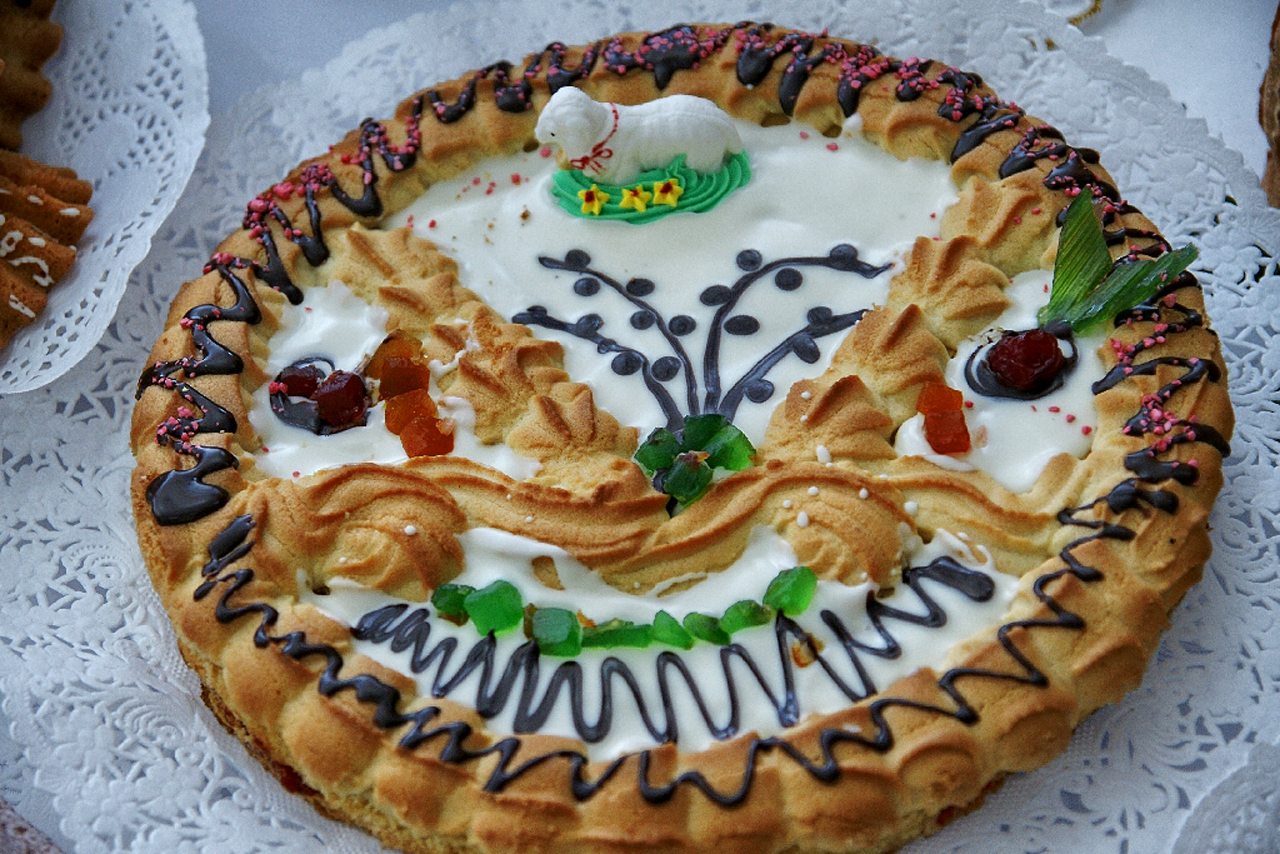
Mazurek decorated for Easter

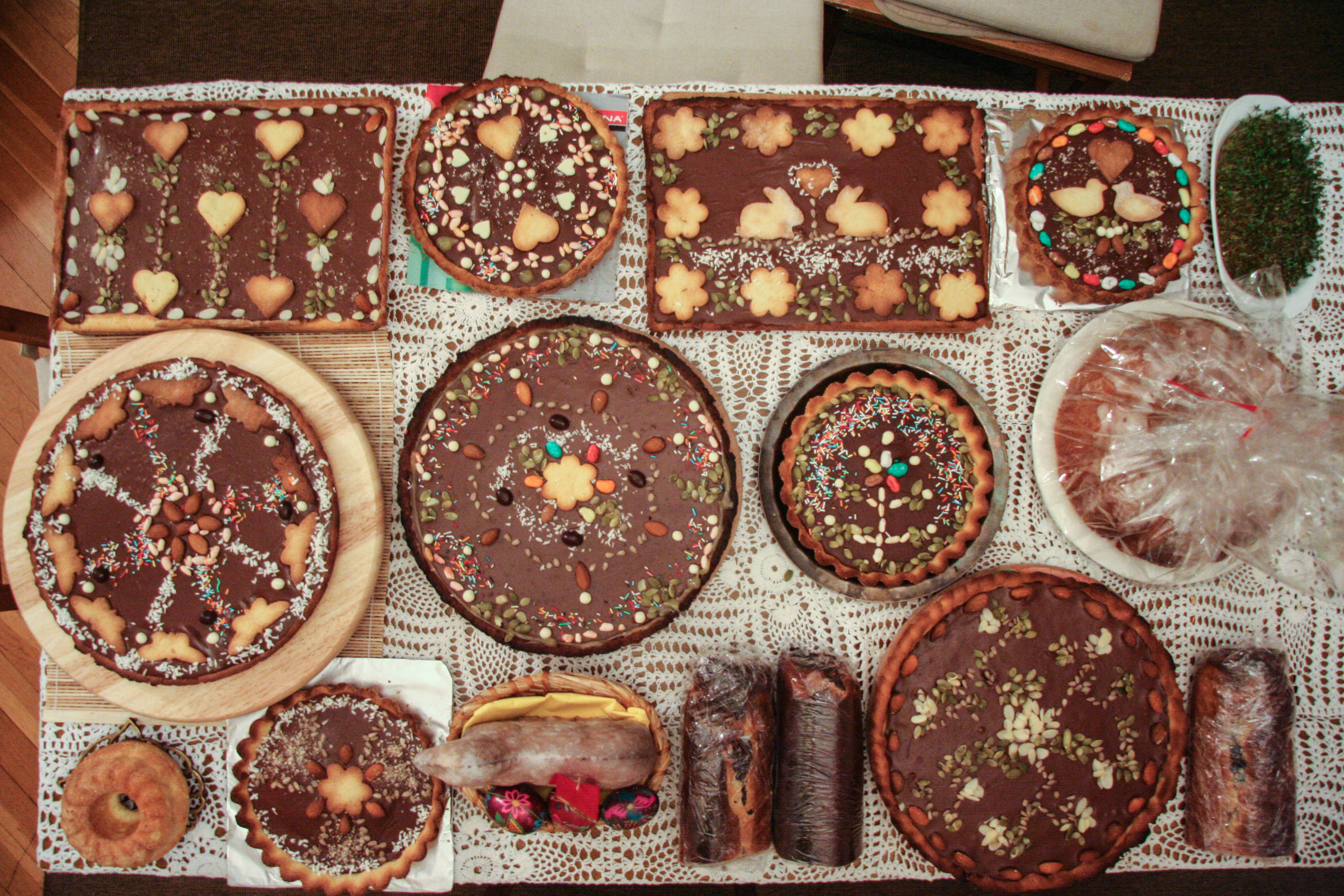
A selection of Mazurek cakes ready for Easter in Poland

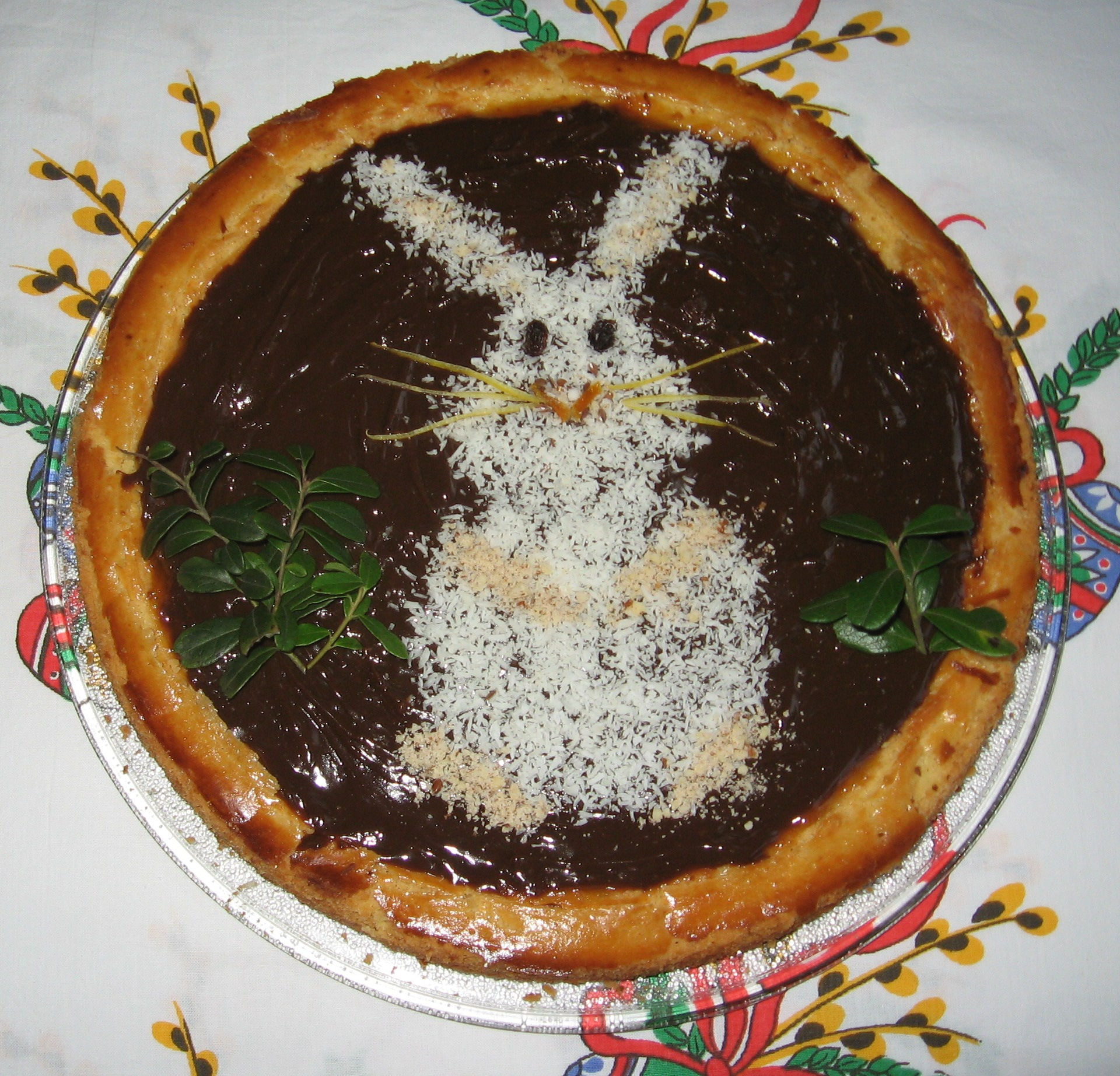
Mazurek Bunny cake

Mazurek (plural: mazurki) is a very sweet, flat cake baked in Poland for Easter.

In common with simnel cake, it is closely associated with Easter and eaten after the Christian festival of Lent.

== Preparation ==
Mazurki are made from any type of cake. They are often composed of two layers of different types of cake. The most typical mazurki are made from sheets of short pastry, sponge-fat pastry or nut-based pastry. Even in old Polish cuisine, mazurki were also made from macaroon and marzipan dough.

According to Polish gastronomy coursebooks, a standard mazurek can be made of one or two sheets of short (or half-short) pastry. The two sheets are fixed together with a help of a layer of marmalade, or as one sheet of short (or half-short) pastry covered with butter sponge cake. In the case of the one-sheet version, marmalade is skipped or goes on top, under a layer of icing.

The cake usually includes the borders made of rolled half-short pastry or the edges marked with nut or almond paste. In case of home-made cakes, the shortcrust base is sometimes crowned with a lattice made of half-short or macaroon pastry.

Mazurek is often layered with or covered with some kind of filling (e.g., nut, almond, kajmak, orange-apple), marmalade or jam. The top is usually finished with icing, glaze or jelly and decorated with fruit (dried, candied or from syrup) and nuts.

== Named variations ==
Among the traditional yet distinctive versions is the "gypsy mazurek" (mazurek cygański), which consists of a sheet of half-short pastry that is half-baked, covered with a layer made of dried fruit, almonds, egg yolks creamed with sugar and whipped egg white and baked again..

Another one is the "royal mazurek" (mazurek królewski) made of one sheet of almond short pasty made with hard-boiled egg yolks.

The "nutty Easter shortcake" (pol. mazurek orzechowy) which was entered onto the list of Polish traditional bakery and confectionery products for the Kuyavian-Pomeranian Voivodeship by the Ministry of Agriculture and Rural Development (MRiRW) on 3 November 2011, and described as having the shortcrust (half-short) base prepared with the addition of ground walnuts. The frosting being of walnut cream or, according to Polish Food magazine published by MRiRW, icing made of sugar, water and milk powder melted together. A thick layer of icing is spread over the baked cake which is finally decorated with dried fruit (raisins), almonds and walnuts.

== Appearance and symbolism ==
They are baked in various shapes – most often they are rectangular (including square ones). There are also mazurki in the shape of rhombuss, triangular, oval and round..

Decorative patterns may include Easter symbols like eggs, hares, pussy willows and Easter greetings. Richly decorated mazurki often serve an ornamental function.

The symbolism of mazurek is closely associated with the period of Lent, marking the successful completion of the festival. After a 40-day fast (although not a total abstinence from food), celebrated in Christian liturgy in memory of the Temptation of Christ, mazurek was supposed to be the rich reward for adherence to faith and tradition. What distinguishes it from other festive dessert cakes is the abundance of decoration with dried fruit and nuts, its overall sweetness, and chocolate icing, contributing to its prolonged freshness. Although today, the religious meaning of mazurek is virtually lost in Poland, the cake is closely associated with seasonal celebrations nevertheless.

News portal Wirtualna Polska insisted that mazurek must not resemble any other regular cake, and that very traditionally "there should be 12 mazurek cakes at Easter, each with a different flavour".

== Name and origin ==
The cake's name may have its origins in the Masovians (old Mazurzy) tribe inhabiting the Mazovia region of central Poland. Another theory says it might originate from the word mazurek (Polish for mazurka), traditional folk dance in triple metre from Poland. Mazurek is considered one of the primary desserts of Easter across Poland.

Although considered uniquely Polish, almost a seasonal national dessert, the recipe for Mazurek came to Poland most likely from the East, via the spice trade-route from Turkey in the early 17th century.

== See also ==
- Simnel cake
- List of Polish desserts
- Easter food
