= Tipsy cake =

Cake soaked in alcohol

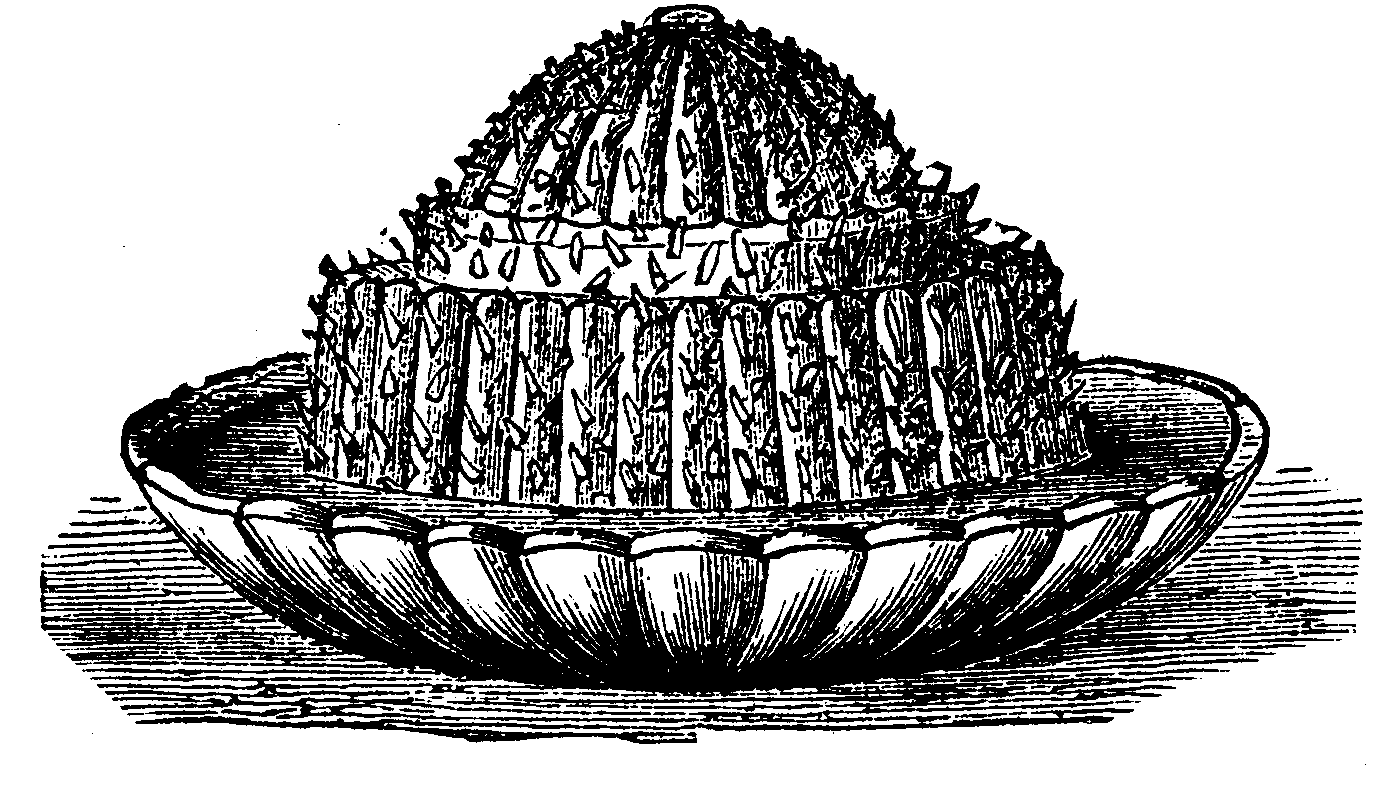
- A tipsy cake from Scammel's Cyclopedia of Valuable Receipts (1897)
- Type: Cake
- Place of origin: England
- Main ingredients: Sponge cake, sherry, brandy, sometimes bourbon or Tennessee whiskey

A tipsy cake is a sweet dessert cake, made originally of "fresh sponge cakes soaked in good sherry and good brandy". The dish as prepared in England would typically have several small cakes stacked together, with the cracks between bristling with almonds. As a variety of the English trifle, tipsy cake is popular in the American South, often served as a dessert or at church socials and neighbourhood gatherings. It was a well-known dessert by the mid 19th century and was included Mrs Beeton's Book of Household Management in 1861.

The tipsy cake originated in the mid-18th century. A recipe for cake or biscuits, alcohol, and custard combined in a trifle bowl came to the American colonies via the British, who settled in the coastal south. Its popularity remained with Southern planters who enjoyed sweet desserts. Tipsy cake was also humorously called Tipsy Parson, because it presumably lured many a Sunday-visiting preacher "off the wagon". The name refers to the amount of alcohol used in the dish's preparation.

One variety of the cake combines stale pound or angel food cake, fruit jam, one ounce whiskey, five ounces sherry, and warm vanilla pie filling or custard. All the ingredients save the pie filling are mixed together; then the warm pie filling/custard is poured over the top and the dish chilled. Whipped cream is poured over the top of the dish just before serving.

== See also ==
- Trifle
- Cuisine of the Southern United States
- Cassata
- List of custard desserts
