= Refreshment Sunday =

Christian celebration during Lent

The Refreshment Sundays or Rose Sundays are Sundays within the two major fasts observed in Western Christianity, Lent and Advent. On these days, the fast was allowed to be relaxed, hence the name "Refreshment Sunday". Correspondingly, the liturgical colours of the season are replaced with rose, hence the name "Rose Sunday".

The Refreshment Sundays are:

- Laetare Sunday, the fourth Sunday in Lent
- Gaudete Sunday, the third Sunday in Advent

Of these, the better known is Laetare Sunday, and if reference is made to a single "Refreshment Sunday" or "Rose Sunday" it is usually this Sunday that is meant. It is also called Mid-Lent Sunday, Mothering Sunday, Mother's Day, and Rose Sunday.

As noted, on both Refreshment Sundays, the colour of vestments and church hangings is changed to rose. On Gaudete Sunday, where churches are using an Advent Wreath with purple candles, the candle for the third Sunday in Advent is also rose instead of purple.

== See also ==
- Rosalia
