= Mothering Sunday =

Christian celebration during Lent

- Observances: Visiting the local mother church or the church in which one was baptised; honouring one's mother
- Date: 4th Sunday in Lent
- 2025 date: 30 March
- 2026 date: 15 March
- 2027 date: 7 March
- 2028 date: 26 March
- Frequency: Annual
- Related to: Laetare Sunday, Lent

Mothering Sunday is a day honouring mother churches, the church where one is baptised and becomes "a child of the church", celebrated since the Middle Ages in the United Kingdom, Ireland and some Commonwealth countries on the fourth Sunday in Lent. On Mothering Sunday, Christians have historically visited their mother church—the church in which they received the sacrament of baptism.

Constance Adelaide Smith revived its modern observance beginning in 1913 to honour Mother Church, 'mothers of earthly homes', the Virgin Mary (mother of Jesus), and Mother Nature. It gained popularity in response to the originally American Mother's Day. The holiday is often known as "Mother's Day" in the United Kingdom, and has become a secular celebration of mothers and motherhood.

== Medieval origin ==
Mothering Sunday coincides with Laetare Sunday, also called Mid-Lent Sunday or Refreshment Sunday, a day of respite from fasting halfway through the penitential season of Lent. Its association with mothering originates in the texts read during the Mass in the Middle Ages, appearing in the lectionary in sources as old as the Murbach lectionary from the 8th century. These include several references to mothers and metaphors for mothers.

The introit for the day is from Isaiah 66:10–11 and Psalm 122:1, using imagery of the New Jerusalem:

Rejoice ye with Jerusalem; and be ye glad for her, all ye that delight in her: exult and sing for joy with her, all ye that in sadness mourn for her; that ye may suck, and be satisfied with the breasts of her consolations. Psalm: I was glad when they said unto me, We will go into the house of the Lord.

Laetare Hierusalem et conventum facite omnes qui diligitis eam: gaudete cum laetitia, qui in tristitia fuistis, ut exsultetis et satiemini ab uberibus consolationis vestrae. Psalmus: Laetatus sum in his quae dicta sunt mihi: in domum Domini ibimus.

Commentators of the period associate this with the personification of the Church as the Bride of Christ or with the Virgin Mary.

The Epistle reading for the day is Galatians 4:21–31, Paul the Apostle's analysis of the story of Hagar and Sarah, speaking of 'Jerusalem ... which is the mother of us all.' While acknowledging the significance of motherhood, Paul understands the story as an allegory, advocating for an understanding of motherhood that transcends the material world and fertility through quoting Isaiah 54:1:

Rejoice, you childless one, you who bear no children, burst into song and shout, you who endure no birth pangs; for the children of the desolate woman are more numerous than the children of the one who is married.

The Gospel for the day is John 6:1–14, the story of the Feeding of the Five Thousand, which prompted the association between Mothering Sunday and the 'Gifts of Mother Earth'.

Inspired by the 'We will go into the house of the Lord' psalm, mediaeval people began to make processions to their local 'mother church' on the day, typically the local cathedral. These could sometimes become unruly, as recorded by Robert Grosseteste (Letter 22.7):

In each and every church you should strictly prohibit one parish from fighting with another over whose banners should come first in processions at the time of the annual visitation and veneration of the mother church. […] Those who dishonour their spiritual mother should not at all escape punishment, when those who dishonour their fleshly mothers are, in accordance with God's law, cursed and punished with death.

== Early modern continuation ==
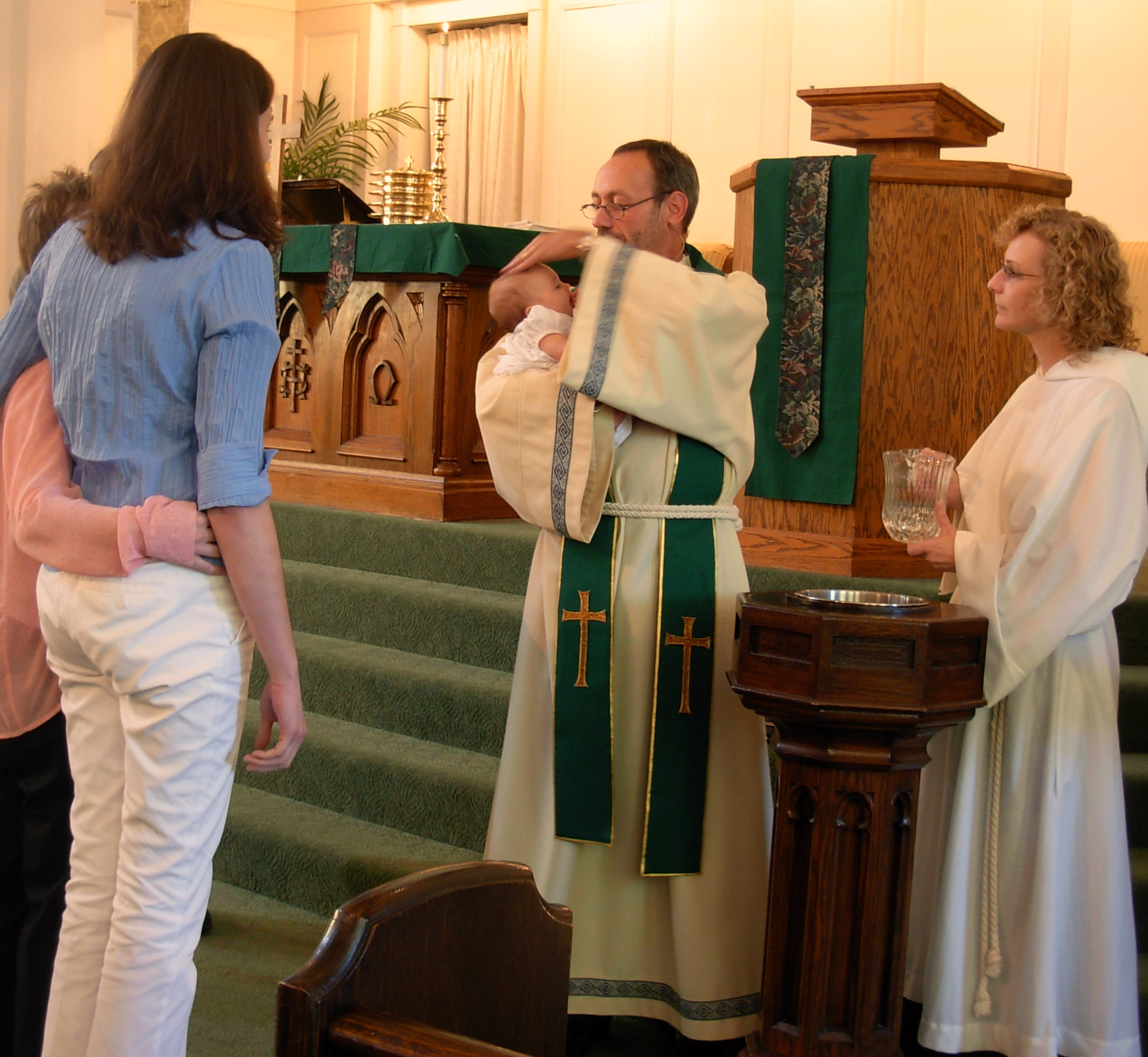
On Mothering Sunday, people historically have visited the church in which they received the Christian sacrament of baptism.

After the English Reformation, the Book of Common Prayer continued to assign the same readings. During the 16th century, Christians continued to return to their local mother churches for a service held on Laetare Sunday. In this context, one's mother church was either the church where one was baptised, the local parish church, or the nearest cathedral (the latter being the mother church of all the parish churches in a diocese). Anyone who did this was commonly said to have gone 'mothering', a term recorded by 1644:

Every Midlent Sunday is a great day at Worcester, when all the children and godchildren meet at the head and cheife of the family and have a feast. They call it the Mothering-day.

In later times, Mothering Sunday became a day when domestic servants were given a day off to visit their mother church, usually with their own mothers and other family members.

== Revival ==
Reacting to Anna Jarvis's efforts to establish Mother's Day in 1913, Constance Penswick Smith created the Mothering Sunday Movement.

Smith published a play, In Praise of Mother: A story of Mothering Sunday (1913), as well as A Short History of Mothering Sunday (1915), which went through several editions. Her most influential booklet was The Revival of Mothering Sunday (1921). This book has a series of four chapters outlining the different aspects of motherhood that the day should honour beyond a strictly biological one:

- 'The Church – Our Mother'
- 'Mothers of Earthly Homes'
- 'The Mother of Jesus'
- 'Gifts of Mother Earth'

By the 1950s, the occasion was celebrated across the United Kingdom and other Commonwealth countries.

The Church of England, as with other Christian denominations, invites people on Mothering Sunday to visit the parish church or cathedral in which they received the sacrament of baptism.

In modern Britain, 'Mother's Day' has become another term for Mothering Sunday in commercial contexts due to American influence, but it continues to be held during Lent. The holiday has also gained secular observance in Britain as a celebration of motherhood, following the American tradition, rather than its original religious meaning.

== Cakes, buns and violets ==
Reflecting the day's association with the story of the Feeding of the Five Thousand and the reprieve from fasting, various types of cakes and buns have long been made for Mothering Sunday, especially simnel cake, as gifts to parents. This is a traditional confection associated with both Mothering Sunday and Easter. In Bristol and some other parts of the world, mothering buns remain a speciality for Mothering Sunday: "plain yeast-leavened buns, iced, and sprinkled with hundreds and thousands, eaten for breakfast on that day".

Numerous newspapers across many decades attest to children gathering violets to present to their mothers on this day. In urban settings, churches supply the violets to the children.

== Dates ==
Mothering Sunday always falls on the fourth Sunday in Lent (Laetare Sunday), 3 weeks before Easter Sunday.

- 22 March 2020
- 14 March 2021
- 27 March 2022
- 19 March 2023
- 10 March 2024
- 30 March 2025
- 15 March 2026
- 7 March 2027
- 26 March 2028
- 11 March 2029
- 31 March 2030
- 23 March 2031
- 7 March 2032
- 27 March 2033
- 19 March 2034
