= Laetare Sunday =

Fourth Sunday in the season of Lent

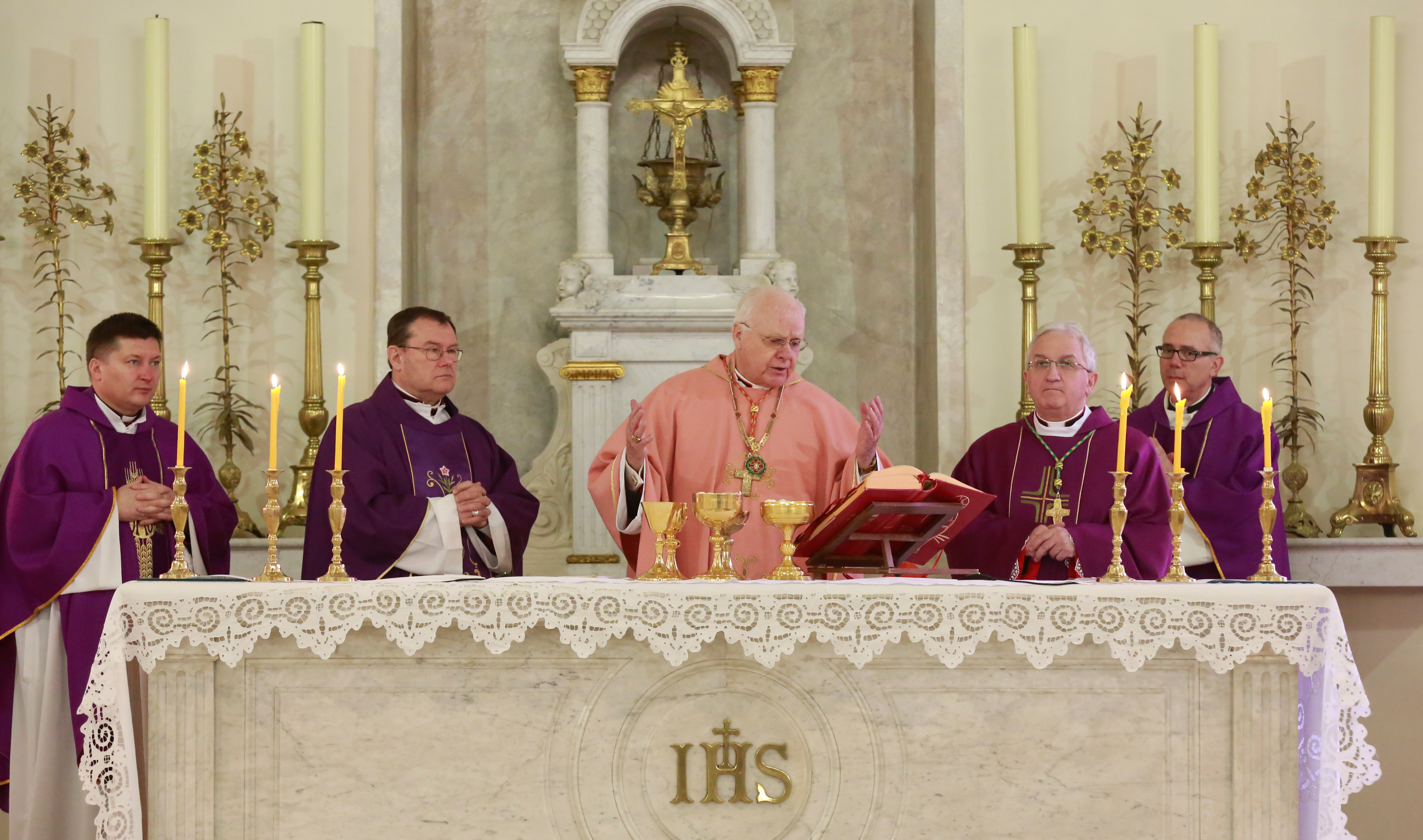
- Rose chasuble worn on Laetare Sunday (priest in middle) in contrast with dark violet worn on other Sundays of Lent (other priests around him) or in a situation where Rose is not available.
- Observed by: Western Christianity
- Liturgical color: Rose
- Type: Christian
- Observances: Church services; feasts/parties
- Date: Fourth Sunday of Lent (21 days before Easter Sunday)
- 2025 date: March 30
- 2026 date: March 15
- 2027 date: March 7
- 2028 date: March 26

The incipit for the Gregorian chant introit from which Laetare Sunday gets its name

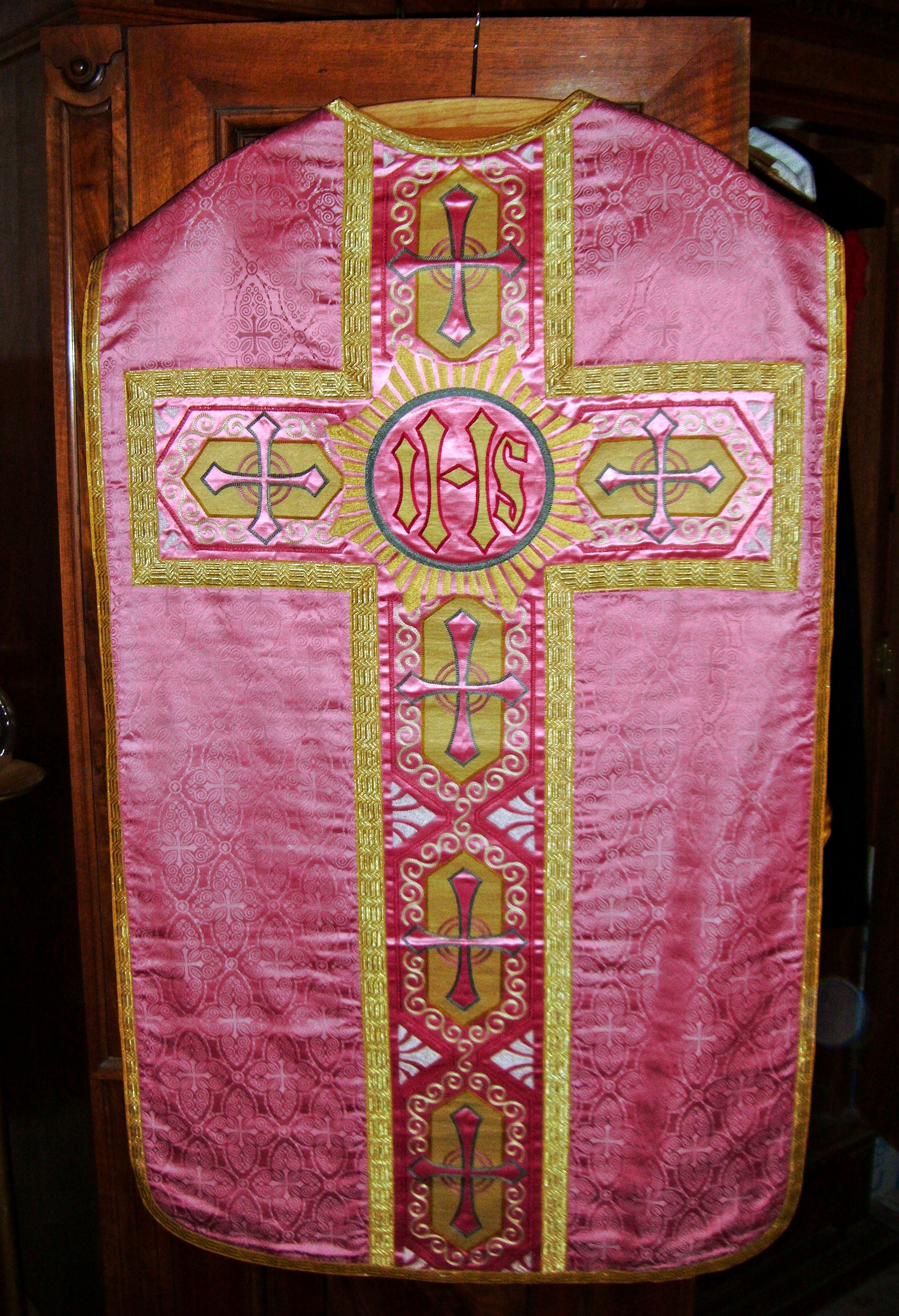
Rose chasuble (for Gaudete and Laetare Sundays), formerly Speyer Cathedral, now Stiftskirche Neustadt/Weinstraße

Laetare Sunday (Church Latin: [leˈta.re]; Classical Latin: [lae̯ˈtaːre]; English: /liːˈtɛəri/) is the fourth Sunday and "half-way point" in the season of Lent, in the Western Christian liturgical calendar. Traditionally, this Sunday has been a day of celebration within the austere period of Lent. This Sunday gets its name from the first few words (incipit) of the traditional Latin entrance verse (Introit) for the Mass of the day. "Lætare Jerusalem" ("Rejoice, O Jerusalem") is Latin from Isaiah 66:10.

The term Laetare Sunday is used by Catholics in the Latin Church, and some Lutheran, and Anglican denominations. The Latin laetare is an imperative: "rejoice!"

== Alternative names ==
This Sunday is currently also known as Mothering Sunday, Refreshment Sunday, mid-Lent Sunday (in French mi-carême) and Rose Sunday (either because the golden rose sent by Popes to Catholic sovereigns used to be blessed at this time, or because the use of rose-colored rather than violet vestments was permitted on this day).

Historically, the day was also known as "the Sunday of the Five Loaves", from the story of the miracle of the loaves and fishes. Before the adoption of the modern "common lectionaries", this narrative was the traditional Gospel reading for this Sunday in Roman Catholic, Lutheran, Anglican, and Old Catholic churches.

== Prayers ==
The full Introit reads:

Lætare Jerusalem et conventum facite omnes qui diligitis eam; gaudete cum lætitia, qui in tristitia fuistis, ut exsultetis et satiemini ab uberibus consolationis vestrae.
Psalm: Lætatus sum in his quæ dicta sunt mihi: in domum Domini ibimus.

Rejoice ye with Jerusalem; and be ye glad for her, all ye that delight in her: exult and sing for joy with her, all ye that in sadness mourn for her; that ye may suck, and be satisfied with the breasts of her consolations.
Psalm: I was glad when they said unto me, We will go into the house of the Lord.

The text of the chant comes from Isaiah 66:10–11 and Psalms 121:1.

== History ==
The station church at Rome for this day was Santa Croce in Gerusalemme, one of the seven chief basilicas; the Golden Rose, sent by Popes to Catholic sovereigns, used to be blessed at this time and for this reason the day was sometimes called Dominica de Rosa.

== Customs ==
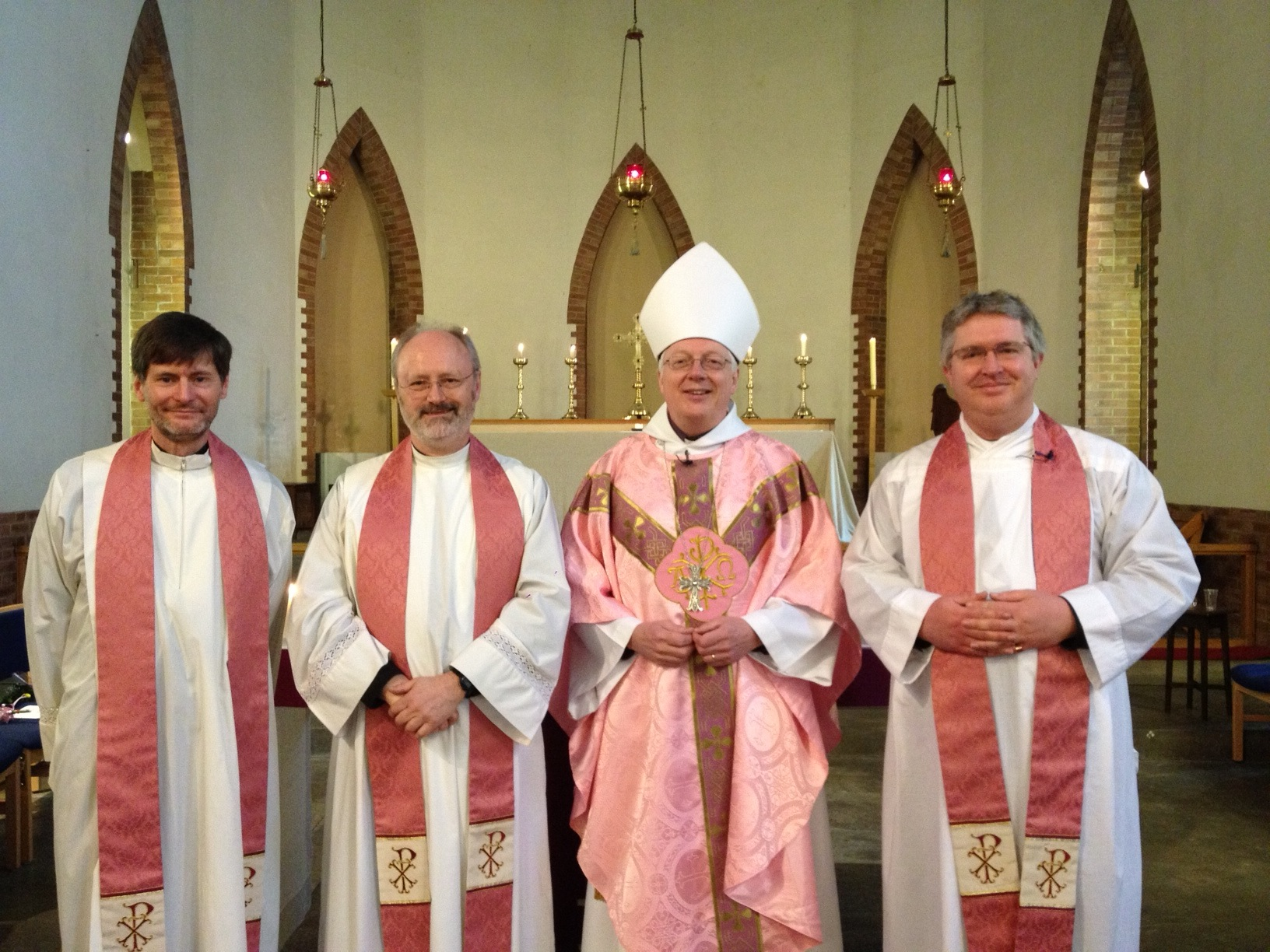
The Anglican Bishop of Willesden (London), wearing rose-pink vestments on Laetare Sunday, accompanied by three of his priests, also in rose-pink stoles, at North Acton parish church

On Mothering Sunday, Christians have historically visited their mother church—the church in which they received the sacrament of baptism.

In Roman Catholic, Anglican, Lutheran and Old Catholic churches flowers may appear on the high altar and the organ may be played as a solo instrument. Priests are given the option to wear rose-colored vestments at Mass held on this day in place of the violet vestments normally worn during Lent. The term "rose" is used to describe this lighter shade of the color violet in the Roman Rite.

The Sunday is considered a day of relaxation from normal Lenten rigours; a day of hope with Easter at last within sight. Traditionally, weddings (otherwise banned during Lent) could be performed on this day, and servants were released from service for the day to visit their mother church, the place in which they received the sacrament of baptism (hence 'Mothering Sunday').

Laetare Sunday is the date on which the recipient of University of Notre Dame's Laetare Medal is announced.

== Date ==
Laetare Sunday is exactly 21 days before Easter Sunday, a moveable feast based on the cycles of the moon. The date can be any between 1 March and 4 April inclusive; occurrence in April is considered to be uncommon; the last occurrence was on 3 April 2011 and the next will be on 4 April 2038, after which it will not occur again until 1 April 2057 – occurrences in April are printed in the below list in bold type. The earliest occurrence of Laetare Sunday in the twenty-first century was on 2 March 2008, and the latest will be on 4 April 2038.

Laetare Sunday occurs on these dates in the twenty-first century:

- 2001 – 25 March
- 2002 – 10 March
- 2003 – 30 March
- 2004 – 21 March
- 2005 – 6 March
- 2006 – 26 March
- 2007 – 18 March
- 2008 – 2 March
- 2009 – 22 March
- 2010 – 14 March
- 2011 – **3 April**
- 2012 – 18 March
- 2013 – 10 March
- 2014 – 30 March
- 2015 – 15 March
- 2016 – 6 March
- 2017 – 26 March
- 2018 – 11 March
- 2019 – 31 March
- 2020 – 22 March
- 2021 – 14 March
- 2022 – 27 March
- 2023 – 19 March
- 2024 – 10 March
- 2025 – 30 March
- 2026 – 15 March
- 2027 – 7 March
- 2028 – 26 March
- 2029 – 11 March
- 2030 – 31 March
- 2031 – 23 March
- 2032 – 7 March
- 2033 – 27 March
- 2034 – 19 March
- 2035 – 4 March
- 2036 – 23 March
- 2037 – 15 March
- 2038 – **4 April**
- 2039 – 20 March
- 2040 – 11 March
- 2041 – 31 March
- 2042 – 16 March
- 2043 – 8 March
- 2044 – 27 March
- 2045 – 19 March
- 2046 – 4 March
- 2047 – 24 March
- 2048 – 15 March
- 2049 – 28 March
- 2050 – 20 March
- 2051 – 12 March
- 2052 – 31 March
- 2053 – 16 March
- 2054 – 8 March
- 2055 – 28 March
- 2056 – 12 March
- 2057 – **1 April**
- 2058 – 24 March
- 2059 – 9 March
- 2060 – 28 March
- 2061 – 20 March
- 2062 – 5 March
- 2063 – 25 March
- 2064 – 16 March
- 2065 – 8 March
- 2066 – 21 March
- 2067 – 13 March
- 2068 – **1 April**
- 2069 – 24 March
- 2070 – 9 March
- 2071 – 29 March
- 2072 – 20 March
- 2073 – 5 March
- 2074 – 25 March
- 2075 – 17 March
- 2076 – 29 March
- 2077 – 21 March
- 2078 – 13 March
- 2079 – **2 April**
- 2080 – 17 March
- 2081 – 9 March
- 2082 – 29 March
- 2083 – 14 March
- 2084 – 5 March
- 2085 – 25 March
- 2086 – 10 March
- 2087 – 30 March
- 2088 – 21 March
- 2089 – 13 March
- 2090 – 26 March
- 2091 – 18 March
- 2092 – 9 March
- 2093 – 22 March
- 2094 – 14 March
- 2095 – **3 April**
- 2096 – 25 March
- 2097 – 10 March
- 2098 – 30 March
- 2099 – 22 March
- 2100 – 7 March

Laetare Sunday and other named days and day ranges around Lent and Easter in Western Christianity, with the fasting days of Lent numbered

== See also ==
- Gaudete Sunday

Sundays of the Easter cycle
Preceded by Third Sunday of Lent	Fourth Sunday of Lent; March 15, 2026	Succeeded by Fifth Sunday of Lent
