= Easter in Poland =

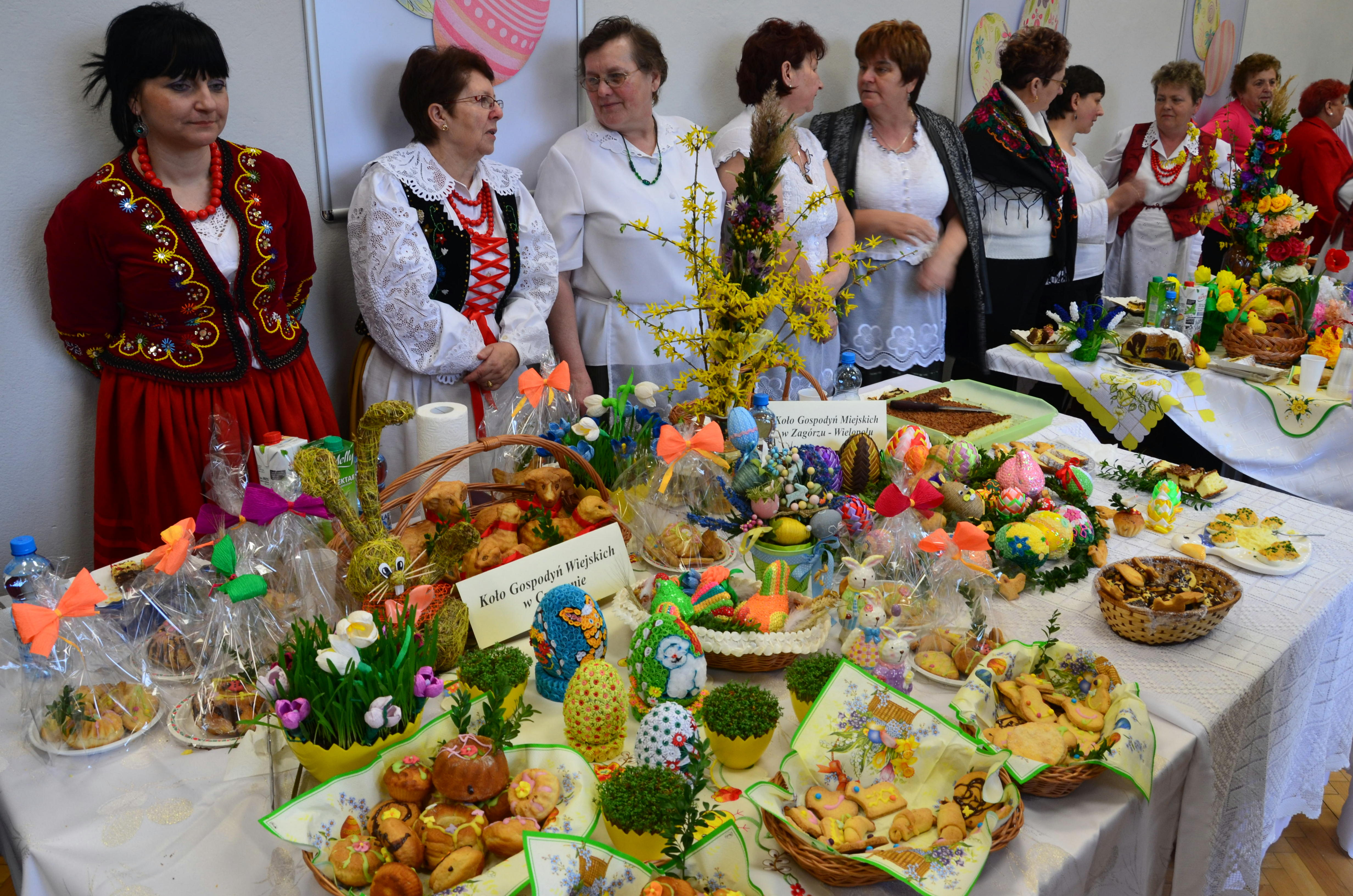
Easter foods, decorations, and traditional folk dress, 2014

Easter in Poland, a public holiday, is one of that country's major holidays, often compared in importance to Christmas. Associated with it are many specific customs and traditions.

Easter has been celebrated in Poland since the country's Christianization in the Middle Ages. During the period of Poland's partitions, it was also an important patriotic observance, reminding Poles of their culture.

Easter is also important to Polish-Americans and other Polish diasporans.

According to a 2012 survey, about 90% of Poles observe some Easter customs, and over 50% participate in Christian Easter observances.

== Traditions ==
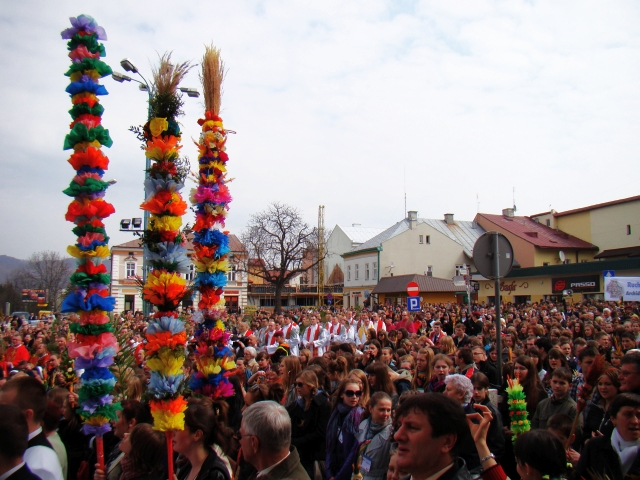
Palm Sunday, Easter palms

Some Polish Easter traditions reach back to earlier, pagan beliefs; some are fusions of pagan and adopted, Christian traditions. They include the Polish Easter basket (święconka), prepared on Holy Saturday, and Easter eggs (pisanki). During Easter, work, both occupational and domestic, is kept to a minimum. As Poland is predominantly Catholic, the Easter traditions are largely Catholic, though most religious minorities also observe their own customs associated with Easter.

A week before Easter, on Palm Sunday, Easter palms are displayed. Traditionally, Easter celebrations begin on Easter Sunday with an Easter Vigil, followed by a rezurekcja (Resurrection) procession. Often sung during the procession are a number of religious songs relating to Easter.

At home, people partake in an Easter breakfast, during which they gift and share eggs. The Easter table is decorated with Easter eggs and other symbols, such as a Lamb of God (a small figurine, often sculpted from edible substances such as sugar, bread, or butter), similar small figurines of chickens and rabbits (Easter Bunnies), and springtime flowers or twigs of plants such as buxus. Typical Easter foods include eggs, meats such as kiełbasa (sausage), soups such as żurek and barszcz, and cakes such as mazurek and baba.

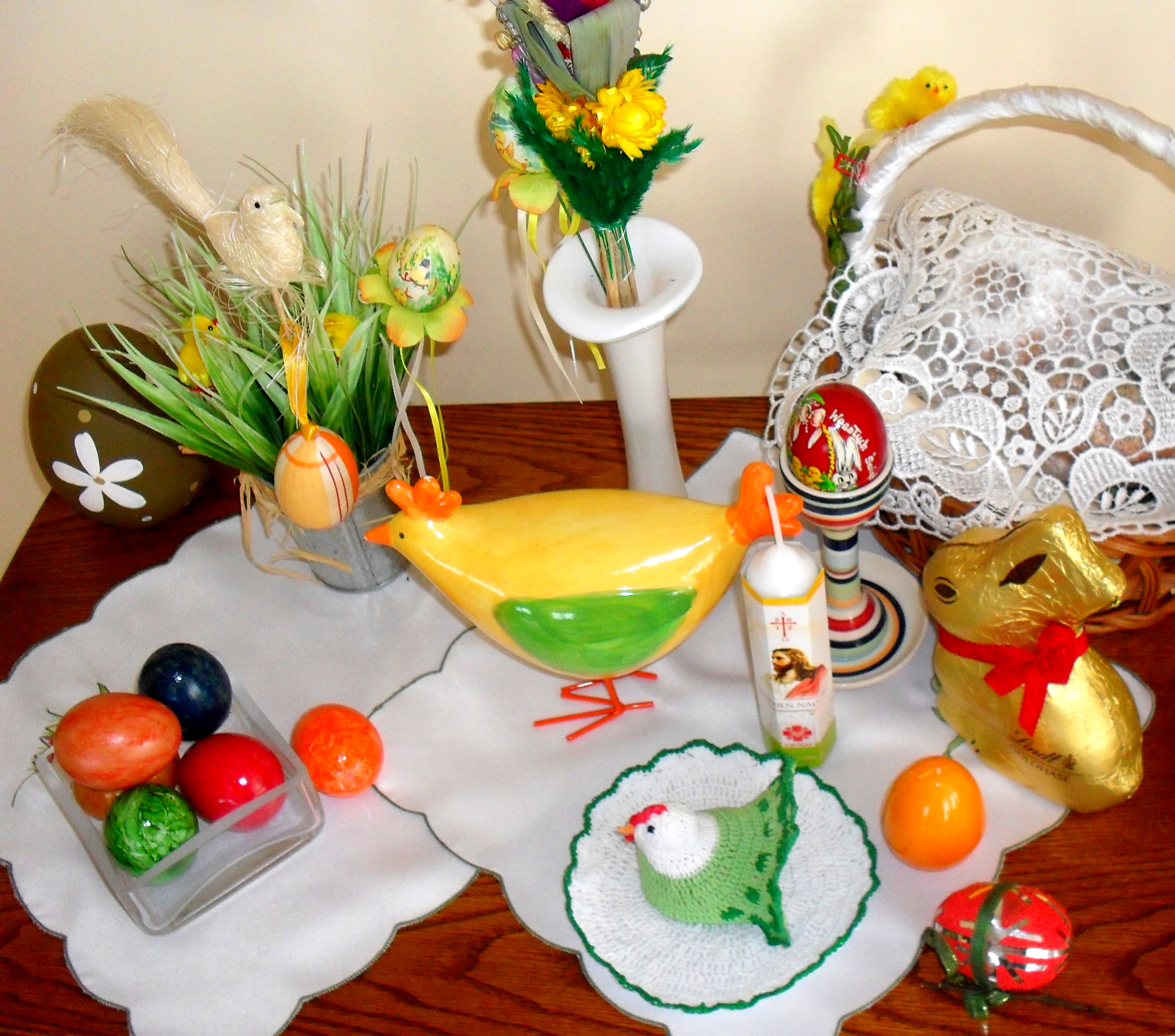
Easter decorations, including rooster, bunny, and Easter eggs (pisanki)

The second day of Easter, Easter Monday, features its own customs, such as śmigus-dyngus, involving the spraying of other persons with water. There are also other games, many involving eggs, such as egg tapping.

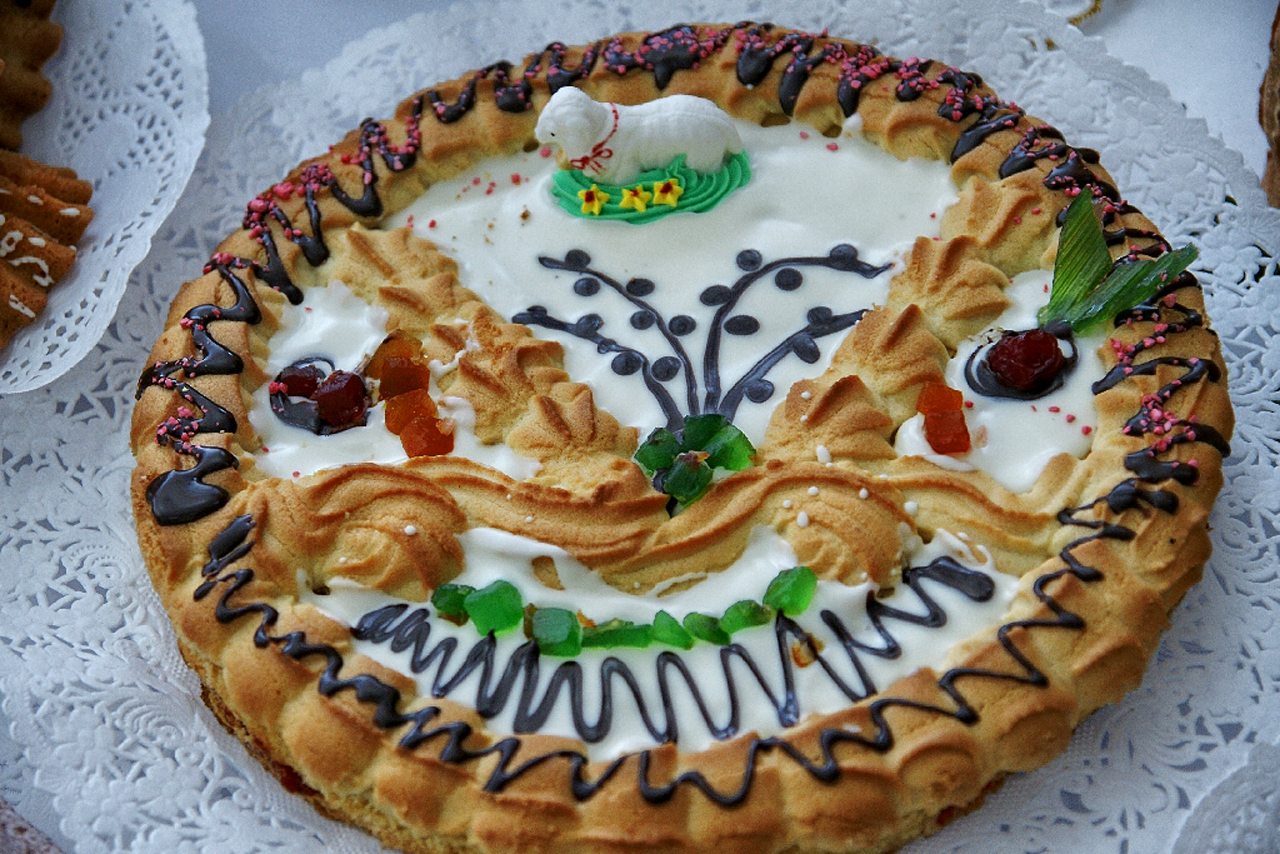
Easter mazurek cake, with edible lamb-of-God figurine

Polish Easter traditions, some varying regionally, include:

- Burning of Judas
- Dziady śmigustne
- Easter palm
- Easter Bunny
- Emaus (festival)
- Fat Thursday
- Funeral of żur and herring
- Gorzkie żale
- Kurek dyngusowy
- Pisanka (Polish Easter egg)
- Palm Jesus
- Przywołówki
- Pucheroki
- Rękawka
- Siwki
- Śmigus-dyngus
- Siuda Baba
- Śmiergust
- Święconka (Polish Easter basket)
- Turki (custom)
- Wykupek
- Żandary

== See also ==
- Christmas in Poland
