= Christmas in Poland =

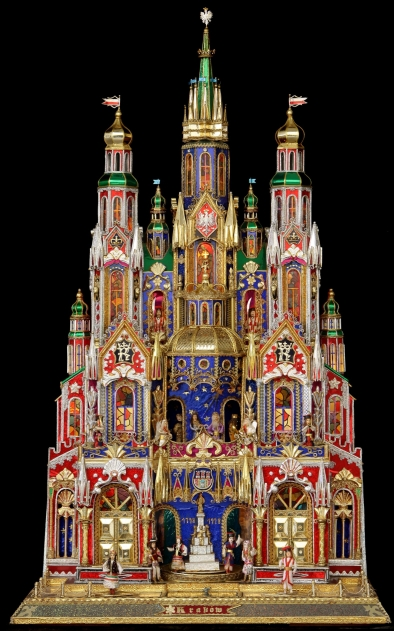
- Nativity scene (szopka) by Bronisław Pięcik, UNESCO Intangible Cultural Heritage

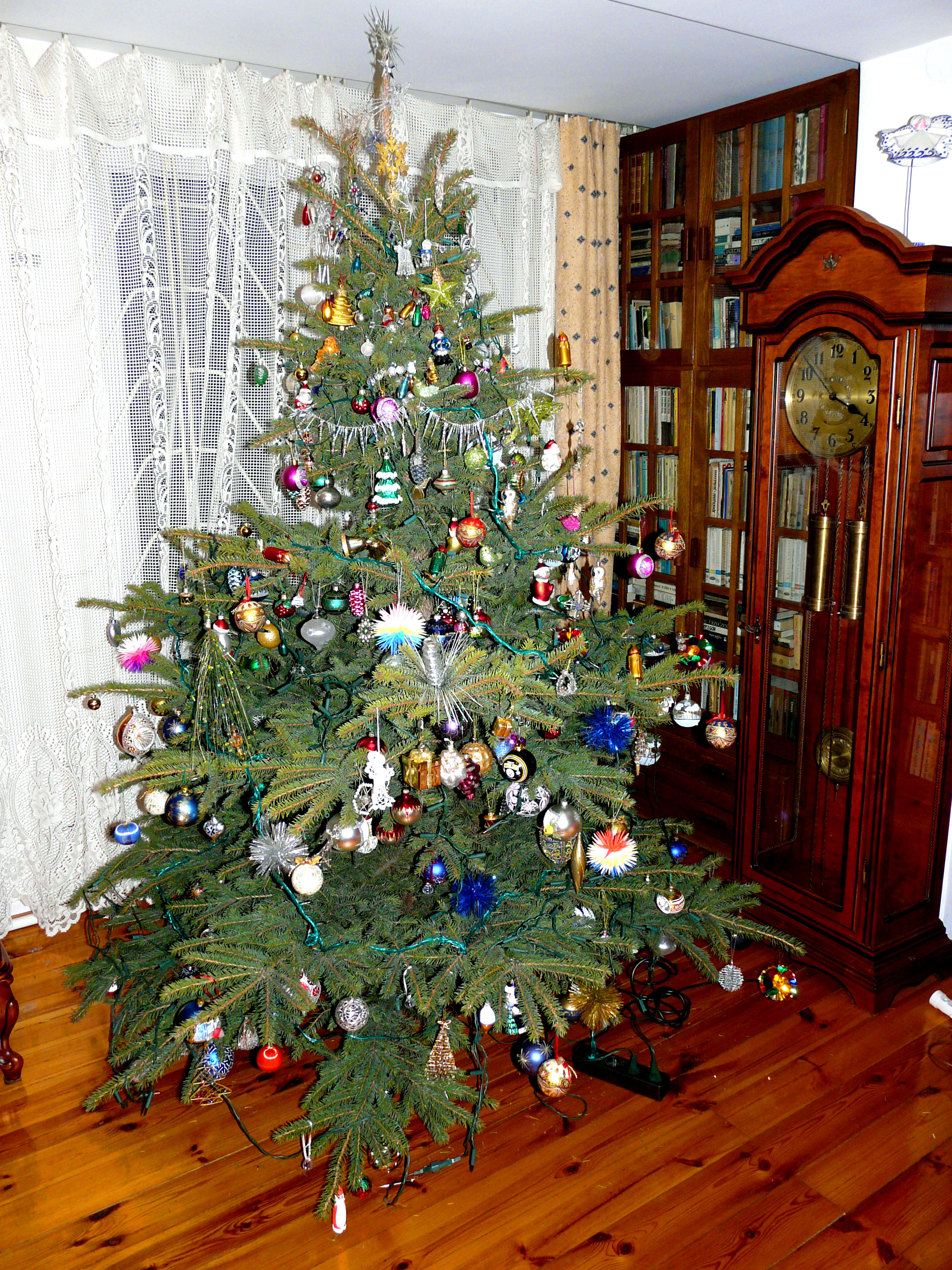
- Christmas trees are traditionally decorated and lit on Christmas Eve, 24 December

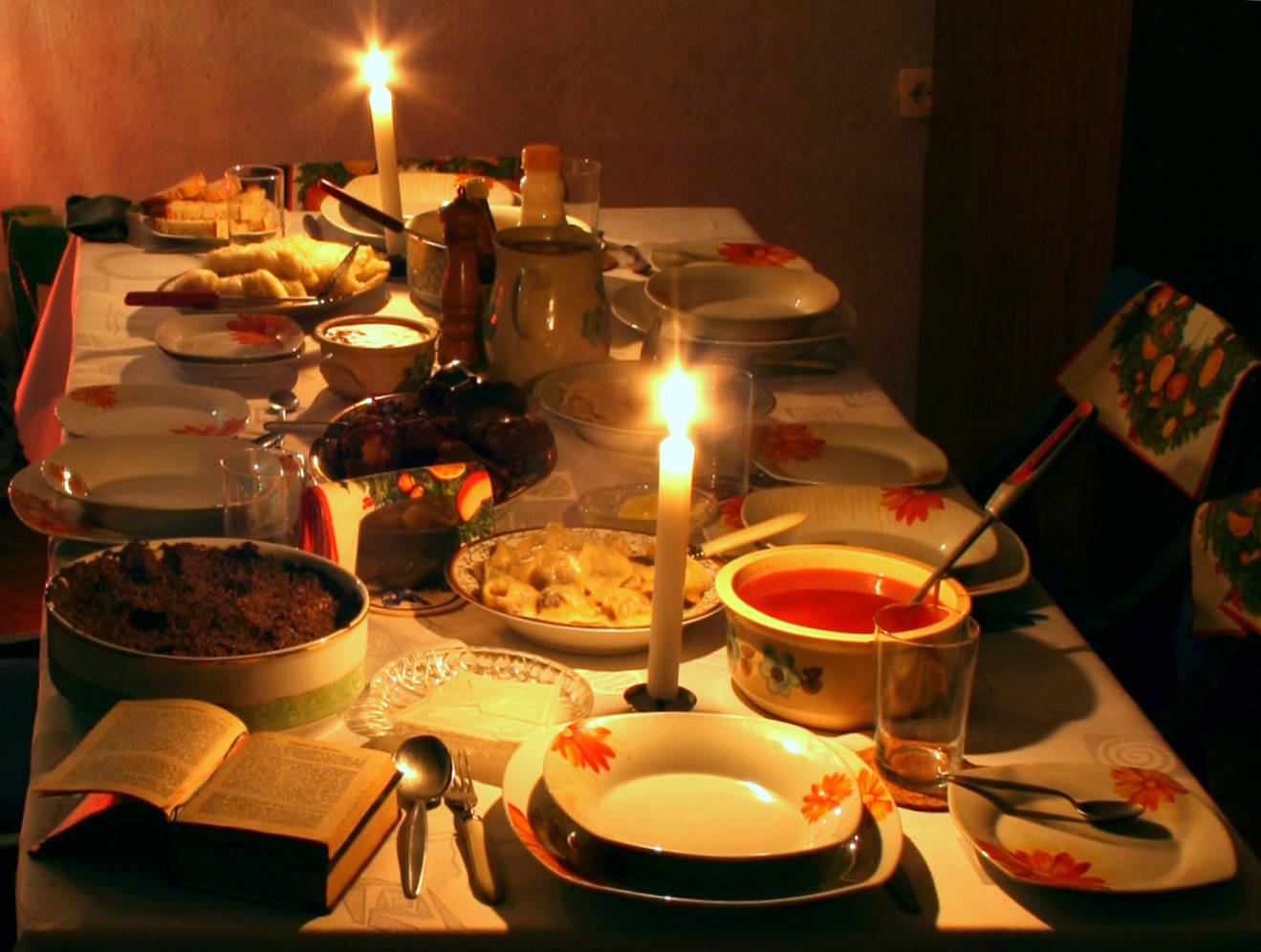
- Christmas Eve supper – Wigilia

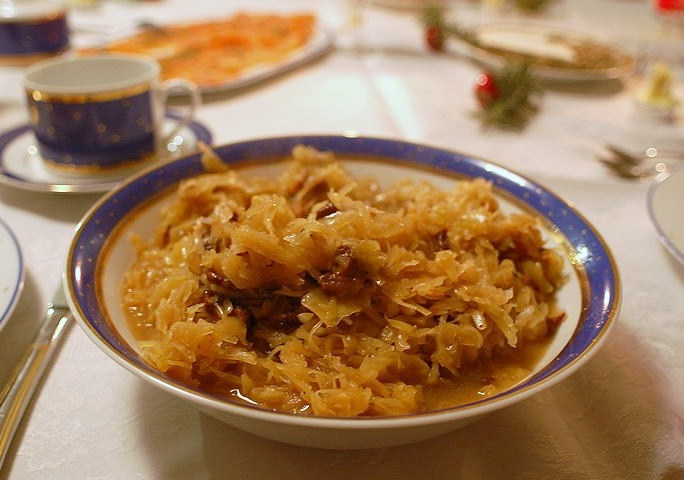
- Traditional Christmas Day dinner serving of bigos on 25 December

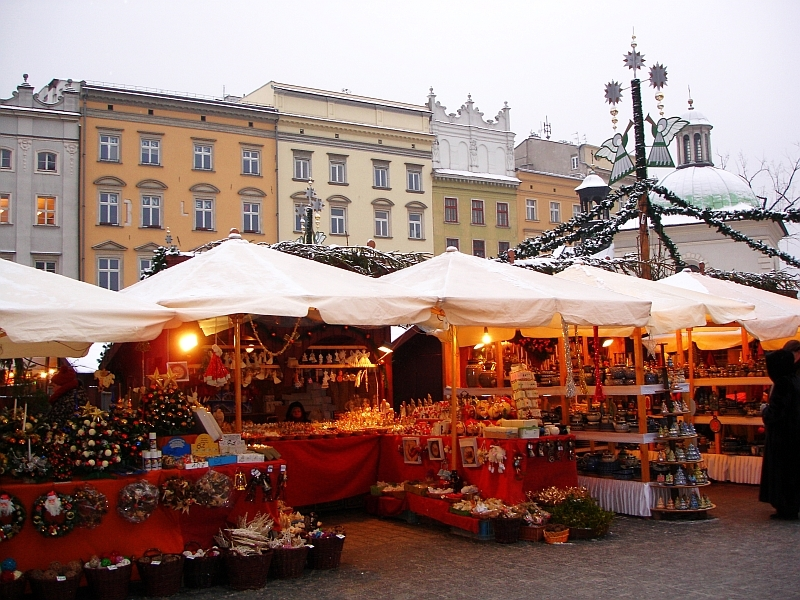
- Christmas markets are held in every major city, especially in Kraków (pictured)

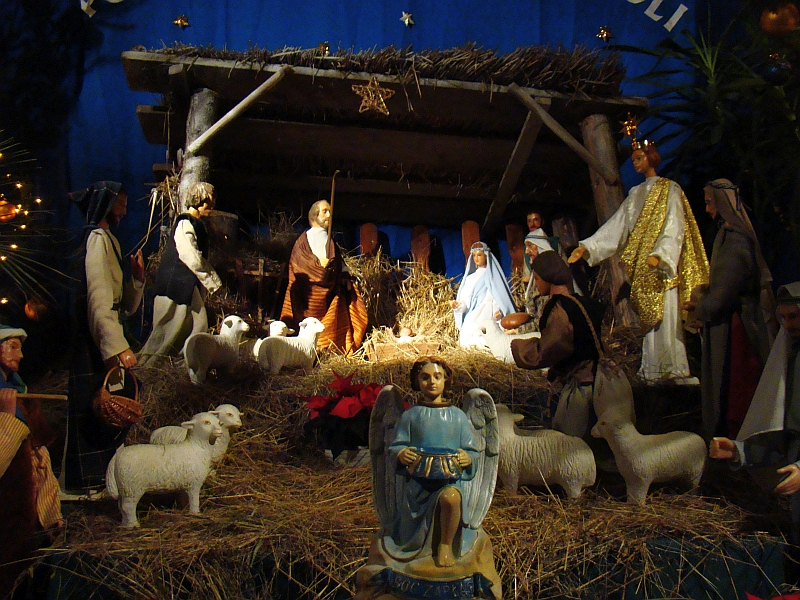
- Nativity scene at the Catholic Church of Christ the King in Sanok.

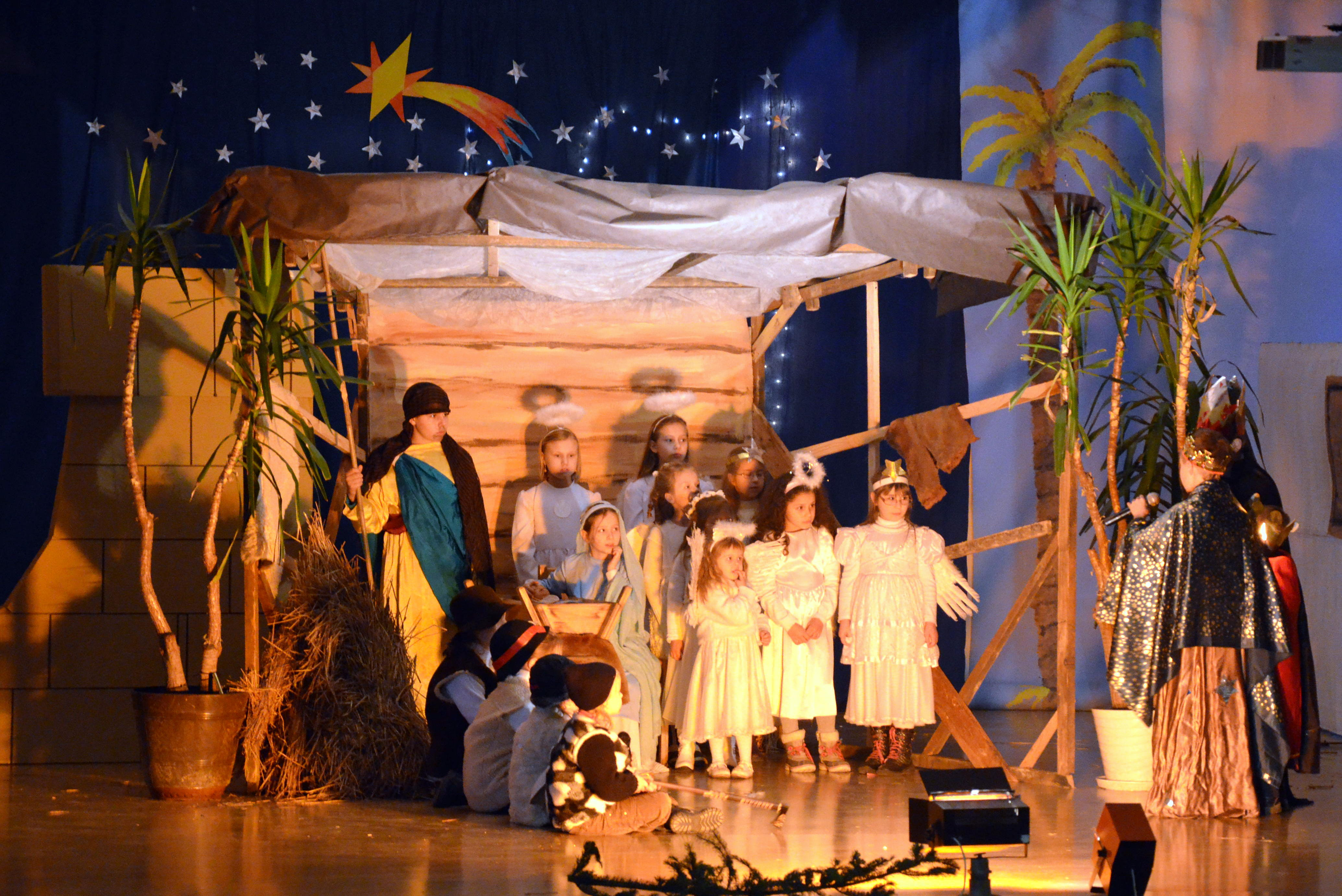
- Nativity play (Jasełka or Herody) by children.

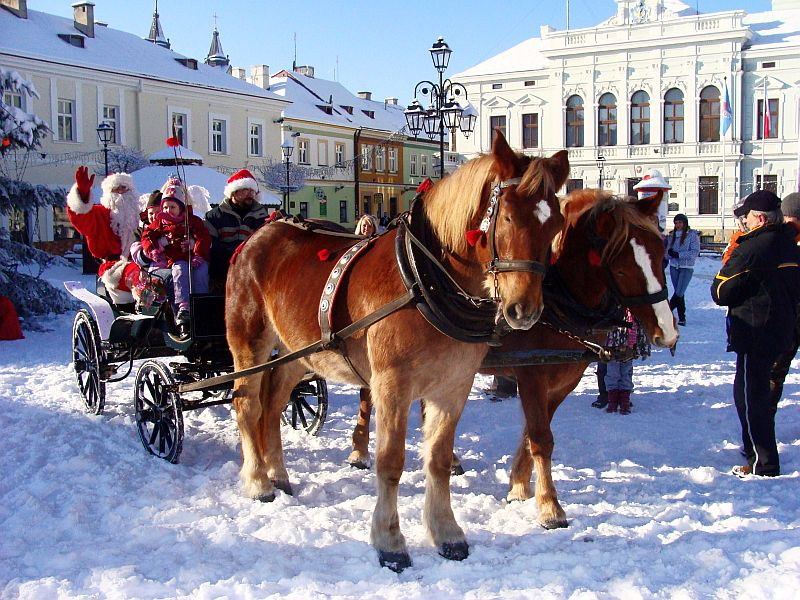
- Kulig with Saint Nicholas.

Christmas in Poland, known in the Polish language as Boże Narodzenie (God's Birth) or Gwiazdka (Little Star), is a major annual celebration, as in most countries of the Christian world. The observance of Christmas in Poland developed gradually over the centuries, beginning in ancient times; combining old Polish pagan customs with the religious practice introduced after the Christianization of Poland by the Catholic Church. Later influences include the mutual permeating of local traditions, lore, and folk culture. It is one of the most important religious holidays for Poles, who follow strict traditional customs, some of which are not found elsewhere in Europe.

The Day of Saint Nicholas on 6 December is the unofficial beginning of the festive season in Poland. Well-behaved children receive small gifts on the day, whereas naughty children receive a lump of coal or a rózga twig. The highlight of the holiday is Christmas Eve on 24 December; Christmas trees are traditionally decorated and lit in family rooms on the morning of Christmas Eve. The Polish Wigilia supper begins with the appearance of the first star, which corresponds to the Star of Bethlehem. During preparation, hay is spread beneath the tablecloth as a reminder that Jesus Christ was born in a manger. An empty place setting is left symbolically at the table for the Lord or lost wanderer. The supper begins with the breaking of the Christmas wafer (opłatek). The meals must be vegetarian (with the exception of fish) as a sign of fasting and twelve different dishes are prepared, thus symbolizing the Twelve Apostles. The celebration ends with the exchange of presents and a midnight mass in churches.

Other aspects of Polish Christmas include nativity plays called "Jasełka" or "Herody", outdoor nativity scenes, the singing of carols, notably "God Is Born" or "Midst Quiet Night", and Kulig, a horse-pulled sleigh ride. The tradition of crafting and hand-making Christmas szopkas in Kraków was declared UNESCO Intangible Cultural Heritage.

== Advent ==
Among the special tasks carried out in private homes during Advent (a time of waiting for the celebration of the Nativity of Jesus) is the baking of the Christmas piernik (gingerbread), and the making of Christmas decorations. Pierniks are made in a variety of shapes, including hearts, animals, and St. Nicholas figures. St. Nicholas does not play a major role on Christmas Day, but is celebrated on his Saint feast day of December 6. He visits good children in secret and leaves presents for them.

Traditionally, the Christmas trees are decorated with glass baubles, garlands and many homemade ornaments including painted eggshells, shiny red apples, walnuts, wrapped chocolate shapes, candles, etc. They are lit on Christmas Eve before Wigilia. At the top of each tree there is a star or a glittering tree topper. In many homes, sparklers are hung on the branches of the trees for wintery ambiance. Sometimes the trees are left standing until February 2, the feast day of St. Mary of the Candle of Lighting.

During Advent and all the way until Epiphany, or the baptism of Jesus (day of January 6), the "gwiazdory", or the star carriers walk through the villages. Some of them sing carols; others recite verses or put on "szopki", or "herody" (nativity scenes). The last two customs are inspired by the traditional manger scenes or "Jasełka" (crib). One tradition unique to Poland and Lithuania is the sharing of the "opłatek", a thin wafer into which a holy picture is pressed. In the old days, people carried these wafers from house to house wishing their neighbors a Merry Christmas. Nowadays, opłatek is mostly shared with members of the family and immediate neighbors before the Christmas Eve supper (Wigilia in the Polish language). As each person shares pieces of the wafer with another, they are supposed to forgive each other any hurts that have occurred over the past year and wish them happiness in the coming year.

== Wigilia, the Christmas Eve supper ==
In Poland, Christmas Eve is a day first of fasting, then of feasting. The Wigilia feast begins at the appearance of the first star. There is no red meat served but fish, usually carp. The supper, which includes many traditional dishes and desserts can sometimes last for over two hours. It is followed by the exchange of gifts. The next day, the Christmas Day, is often spent visiting friends. In Polish tradition, people combine religion and family closeness at Christmas. Although gift-giving plays a major role in the rituals, the emphasis is placed more on the making of special foods and decorations.

On the night of Christmas Eve, so important is the appearance of the first star in remembrance of the Star of Bethlehem, that it has been given an affectionate name of "the little star" or Gwiazdka (the female counterpart of St. Nicholas). On that evening, children watch the sky anxiously hoping to be the first to cry out, "The star has come!" Only after it appears, the family members sit down to a dinner table.

According to tradition, bits of hay are spread beneath the tablecloth as a reminder that Christ was born in a manger. Others partake in the practice of placing money under the tablecloth for each guest, in order to wish for prosperity in the coming year. Some practice the superstition that an even number of people must be seated around the table. In many homes an empty place setting is symbolically left at the table for the Baby Jesus or, for a lonely wanderer who may be in need of food, or if a deceased relative should come and would like to share in the meal.

The supper begins with the breaking of the opłatek wafer. Everyone at the table breaks off a piece and eats it as a symbol of their unity with Christ. They then share a piece with each family member. A tradition exists among some families to serve twelve different dishes at Wigilia symbolizing the Twelve Apostles, or perhaps, an odd number of dishes for good luck (usually five, seven, or nine).

A traditional Wigilia supper in Poland includes fried carp and borscht (beetroot soup) or mushroom consommé with uszka (tortellini). Carp provides a main component of the Christmas Eve meal across Poland; carp fillet, carp in aspic and gefilte fish. Universal Polish Christmas foods are pierogi as well as some herring dishes, and for dessert, makowiec or noodles with poppy seed. Often, there is a compote of dry fruits for a drink.

The remainder of the evening is given to stories and songs around the Christmas tree. In some areas of the country, children are taught that "The Little Star" brings gifts. As presents are unwrapped, carollers may walk from house to house receiving treats along the way.

Christmas Eve ends with "Pasterka", the Midnight Mass at the local church. The tradition commemorates the arrival of the shepherds to Bethlehem and their paying of respect and bearing witness to the newborn Messiah. The custom of Christmas night liturgy was introduced in the Christian churches after the second half of the 5th century. In Poland that custom arrived together with the coming of Christianity. The next day (December 25) begins with the early morning mass followed by daytime masses. According to scripture, the Christmas Day masses are interchangeable allowing for greater flexibility in choosing the religious services by individual parishioners.

== Kolędy, the Christmas carols ==
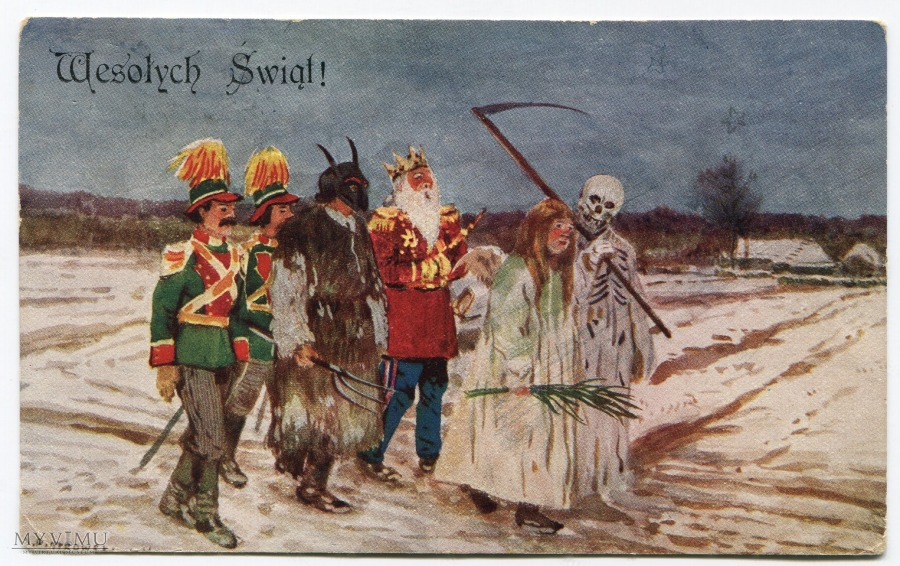
Mummers with a Turoń creature singing Christmas carols called kolędy in Poland, 1929 postcard.

Christmas carols are not celebrated in Poland until during-and-after the Christmas Vigil Mass called "Pasterka" held between 24 and 25 of December. The Christmas season often runs until Candlemas. The early hymns sung in the Catholic church were brought to Poland by the Franciscan Brothers in the Middle Ages. The early Christmas music was Latin in origin. When the Polish words and melodies started to become popular, including many new secular pastorals (pastorałka, or shepherd's songs), they were not written down originally, but rather taught among people by heart. Notably, the song "God Is Born" (Bóg się rodzi) with lyrics written by Franciszek Karpiński in 1792 became the Christmas hymn of Poland already in the court of King Stefan Batory. Many of the early Polish carols were collected in 1838 by Rev. Mioduszewski in a book called Pastorałki i Kolędy z Melodiami (Pastorals and Carols with Melodies), including "Midst Quiet Night".

== Polish hand-made Christmas ornaments ==
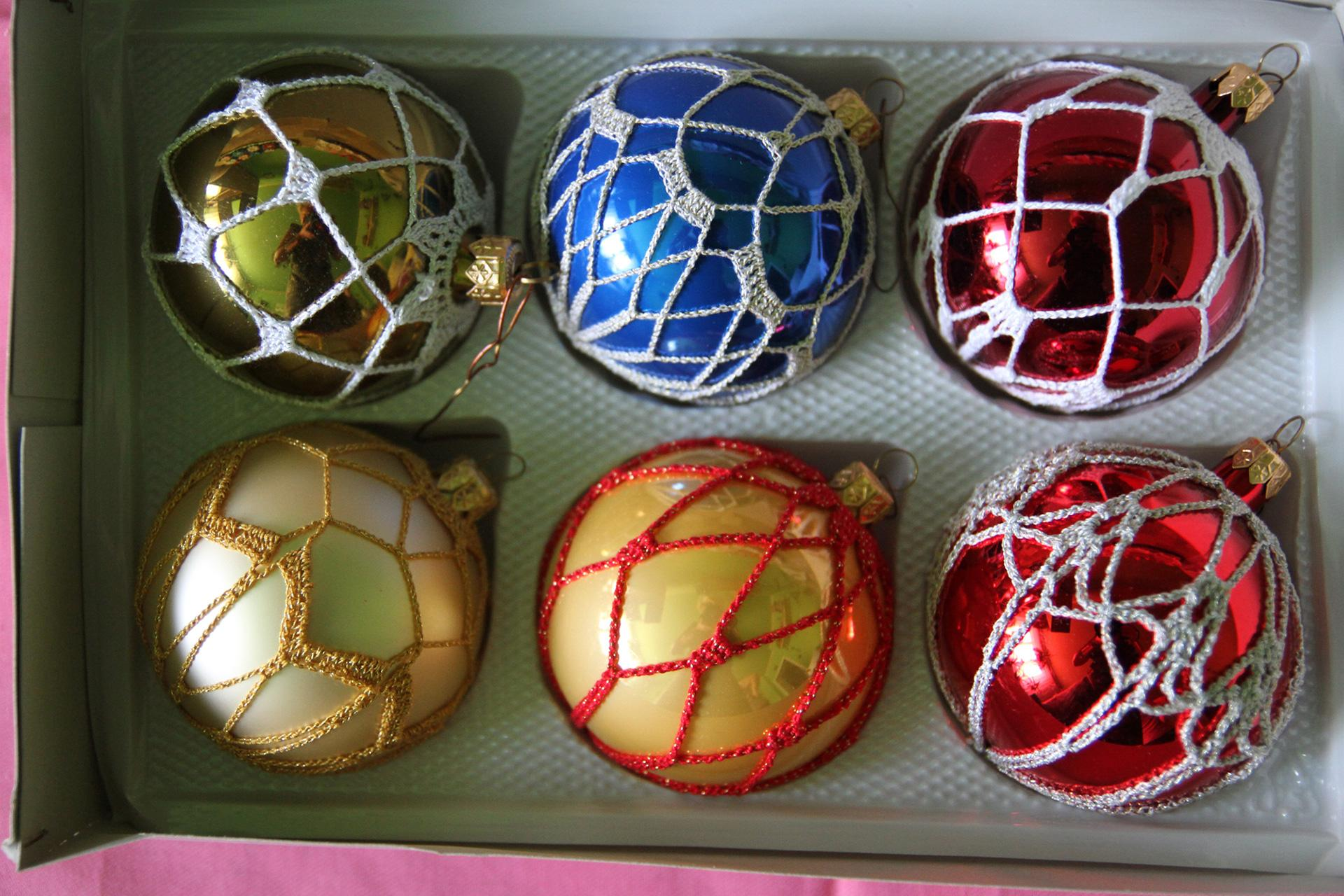
Traditional Polish glass baubles with lace details. Poland is a major exporter of Christmas decorations, especially hand-blown ornaments.

Poland produces some of the finest hand blown glass Christmas ornaments in Europe. Families and collectors value these ornaments for high quality, traditional artwork, and unique decorations.

Polish blown-glass Christmas ornaments are generally manufactured only in the winter season. The modern glass workshops and manufacturers tend to be localized in the southern regions of Poland.

== See also ==
- Easter in Poland
- God Is Born
- Kraków szopka
- Wigilia the Christmas Eve vigil supper
- Christmas worldwide
