= Midst Quiet Night =

Polish Christmas carol

"Wśród nocnej ciszy" sung by artists of the Studio Accantus

Wśród nocnej ciszy, known in English as Midst Quiet Night, is a popular Polish Christmas carol from the turn of 18th and 19th centuries.

The Australian poet, Peter Skrzynecki, has a poem titled "Wśród nocnej ciszy" (p. 102 of his Old World/New World anthology), which puts forward the idea that sometimes the real meaning of Christmas is lost, amongst our many Christmas cultural traditions.

== See also ==
- God Is Born
- Christmas in Poland
- List of Christmas carols
