= Pasterka =

Polish Catholic midnight mass

Pasterka, the Midnight Mass
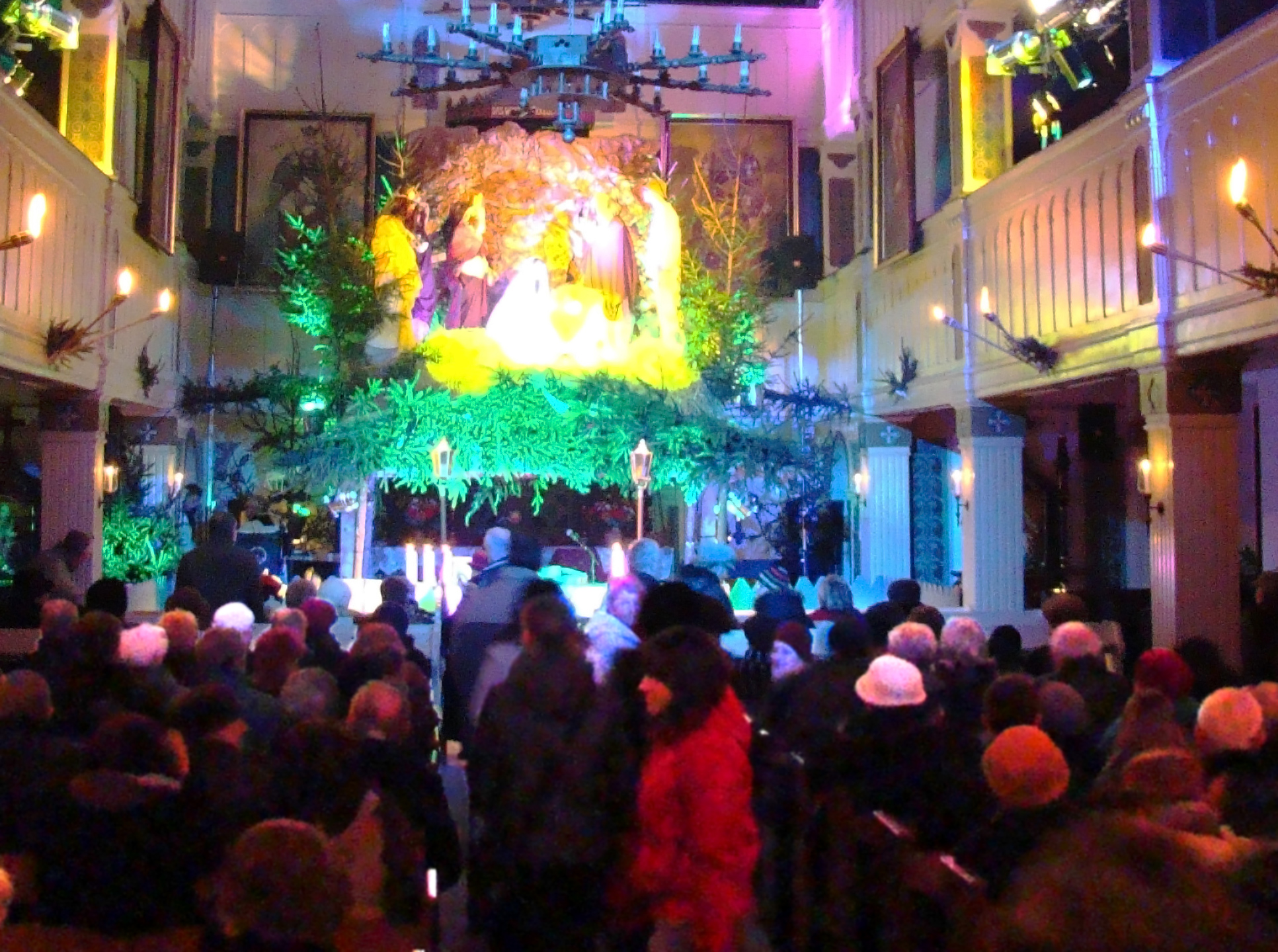
- Pasterka celebrated in Aleksandrów Łódzki, 2009
- Classification: Catholic Church
- Theology: New Testament
- Region: Poland
- Other name: Shepherds' Mass

Pasterka (Polish: [pasˈtɛrka]) is a midnight mass celebrated by Catholics during Christmas between December 24 and 25 across Poland. A close translation of the name would be the "Shepherds' Mass" (literally: 'that which belongs to the shepherds' in Polish), in reference to the Biblical shepherds, who were visited by an angel and told of the birth of Christ. During the Pasterka Mass, Polish people sing traditional kolędy, Christmas carols (from the Roman calendae) in the spirit of joy.

== Celebrations ==
Although the Pasterka mass is closely associated with the specific time in Christian liturgy, it is not the actual hour of the night that predicates its meaning. According to the Polish ordinance of the Eucharist, the Pasterka is defined only by the type of prayer and biblical texts used during Christmas celebrations. It can be held more than once on December 24, in more than one location by the parish priest; at the church and at a nearby chapel. Often, there are two (or even three) Pasterkas celebrated next to each other – earlier ones for the families with children, then at 9 and 10 p.m. for the youth, and a final one at 12:00 midnight, for the adults.

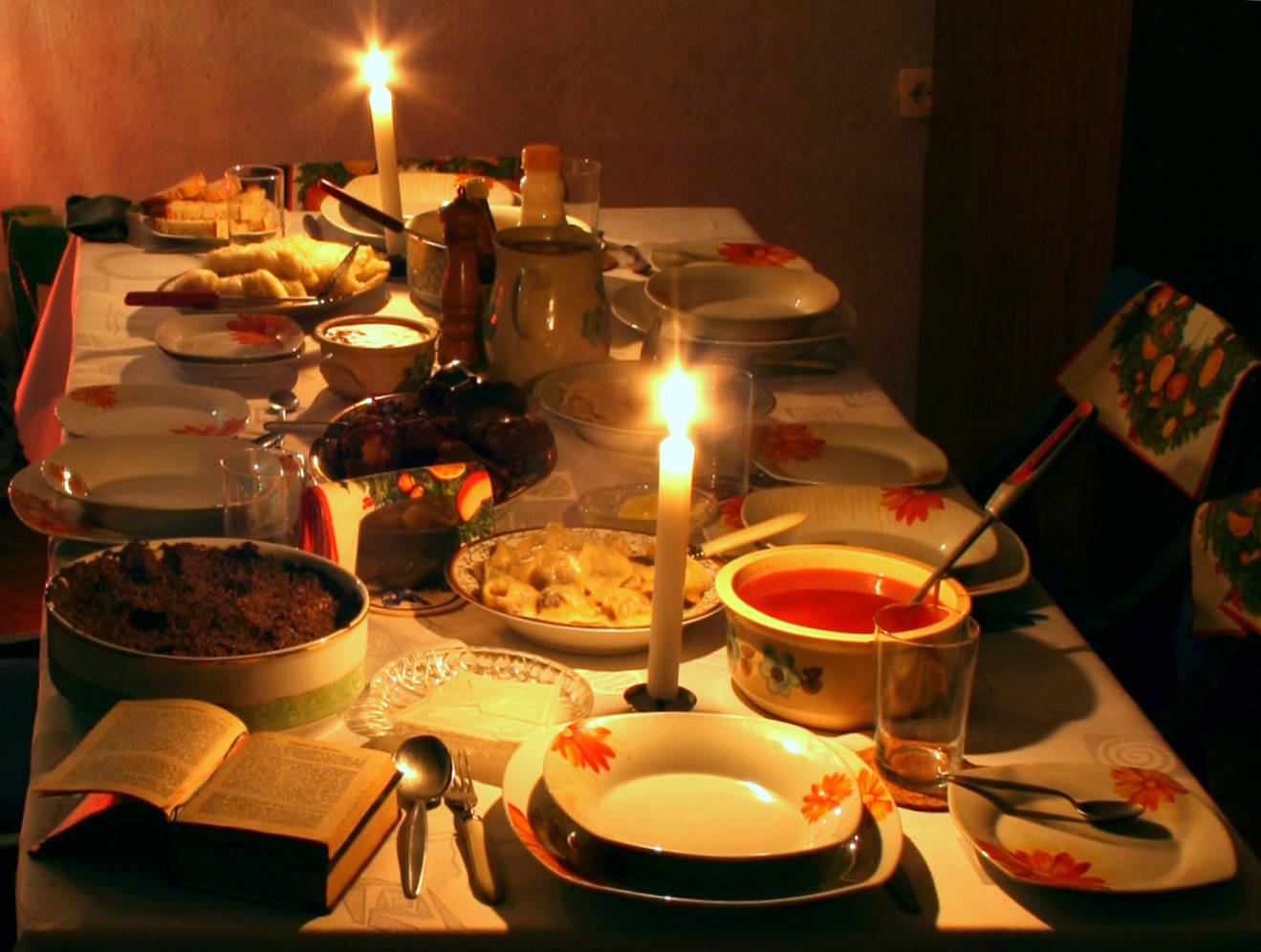
Wigilia supper before midnight carolling at Pasterka

The participation in the Birth of Christ celebrations is obligatory for all practicing Catholics. They have the option of attending any one of the evening masses or even more than one. Priests may refer to all of them as Pasterka, even though formally they are called Wigilia masses by the episcopate as opposed to the grand mass at midnight. The exact hour of the birth of Christ is not written in the canonical gospels, which allows for choosing the ideal time for ritual prayer on that occasion. On Christmas Eve (December 24) and on Christmas Day, the masses can be celebrated from three different liturgical texts, each suited to a specific sacrament of the Eucharist. In the early hours, the worshippers can attend the Advent waiting mass, which does not excuse them from participating in the Nativity mass for the Birth of Christ later on.

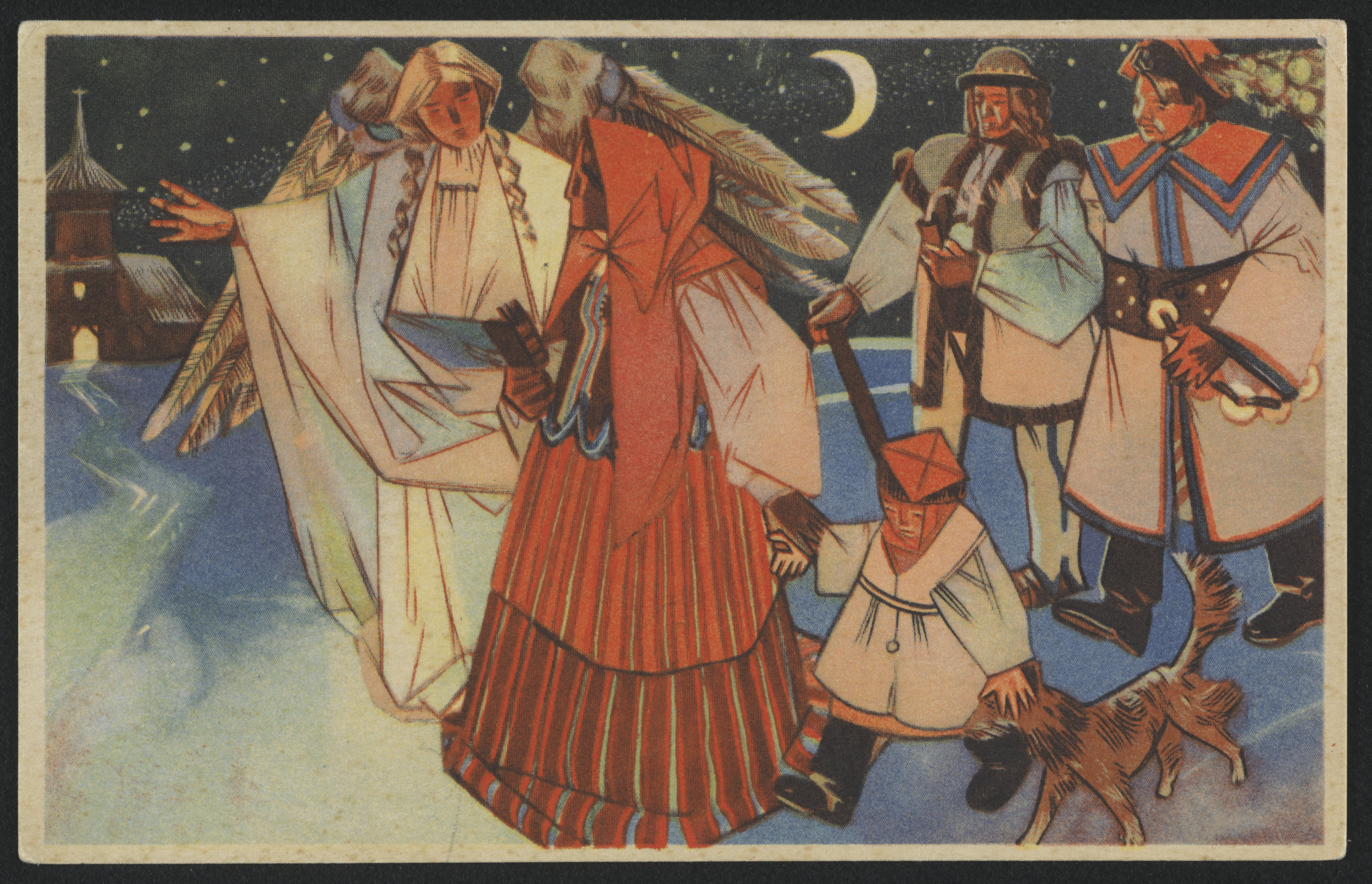
Polish postcard from the 1930s showing people arriving for pasterka dressed in folk costumes

There are no masses in the late afternoon on December 24, which is the time for Wigilia, the traditional supper at family homes. The first evening mass of the Christmas Eve (after the Wigilia) is celebrated around 4 p.m. or later before 8 p.m. followed by the 10 p.m. mass and the one-hour-long grand Midnight Mass, which begins at 12. Music for the Midnight Mass begins as soon as the doors open at 11:00 pm. The Blessing of the Crib can take place before, or after the homilies, when the priests open the Szopka nativity scenes set up by the main altar. Traditionally, the service concludes with an Apostolic Blessing. The next day masses are interchangeable according to scripture, allowing for flexibility in choosing the religious services by individual parishioners. The Christmas Day begins with the early morning mass followed by daytime masses.

Pasterka is a Catholic mass specific to the Birth of Christ celebrations in Poland. Participation in Pasterka is synonymous with Christmas. Many practicing Catholics visit the Church twice on that occasion and are encouraged by the priest to do so.

Polish traditional Christmas carol
Music sample from the Bóg się rodzi.
Lyrics by Franciszek Karpiński, 1792.

== See also ==
- Polish Christmas carol Bóg się rodzi (God Is Born)
- Christmas worldwide
