= Wigilia =

Polish Christmas Eve vigil supper

Wigilia, the Christmas Eve supper

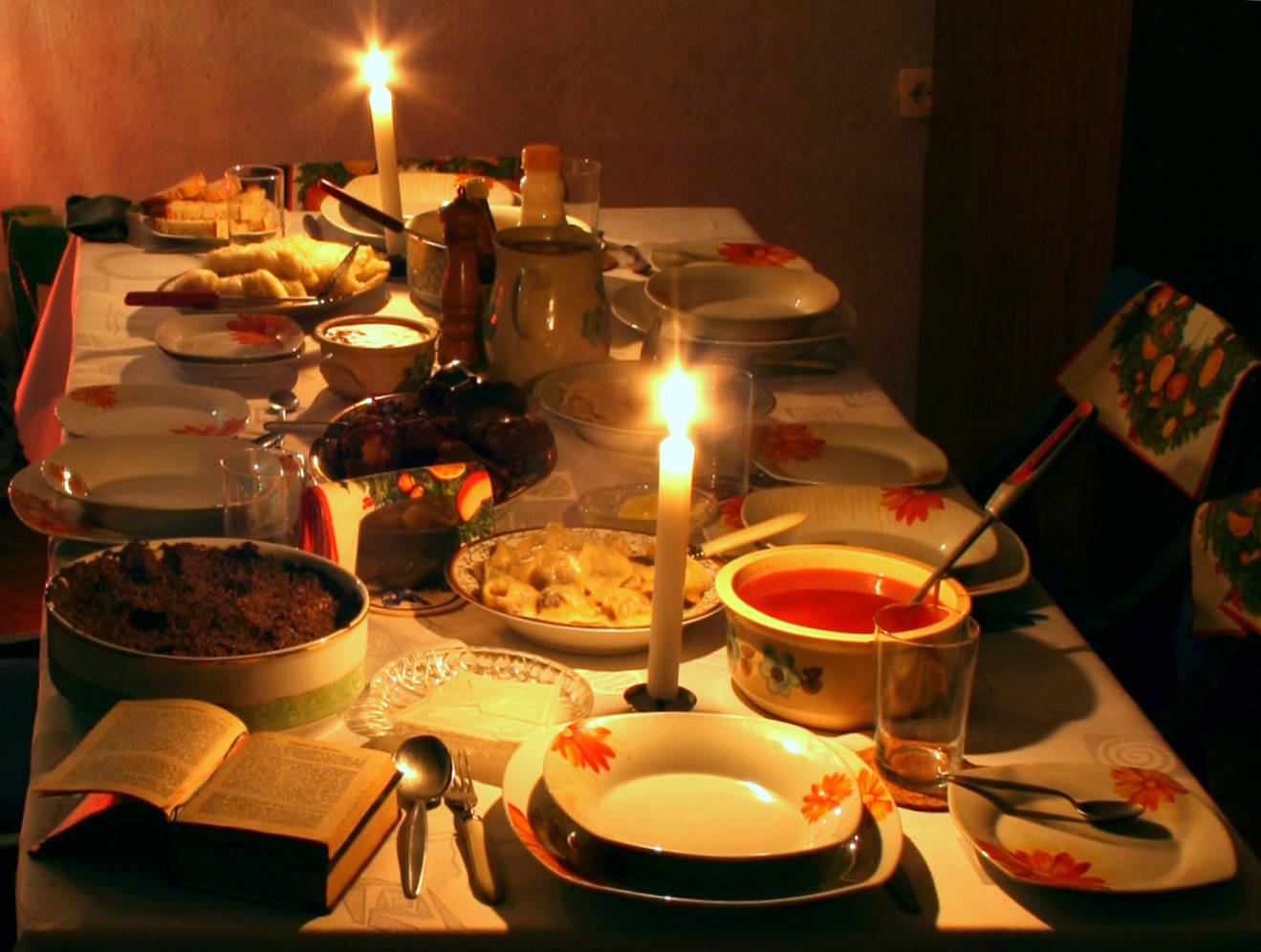
The traditional Wigilia dinner table

Wigilia (Polish pronunciation: [vʲiˈɡʲilja]) is the traditional Christmas Eve vigil supper in Poland, held on 24 December. The term is often applied to the whole of Christmas Eve, extending further to Pasterka—midnight Mass, held in Roman Catholic churches all over Poland and in Polish communities worldwide at or before midnight. The custom is sometimes referred to as "wieczerza" or "wieczerza wigilijna", in Old Polish meaning evening repast, which is linked to the late church service or Vespers. The word Wigilia derives from the Latin vigil. The associated feasting follows a day of abstinence and traditionally begins once the First Star has been sighted. Christmas is also sometimes called "Gwiazdka", "little star".

== Traditions and customs ==
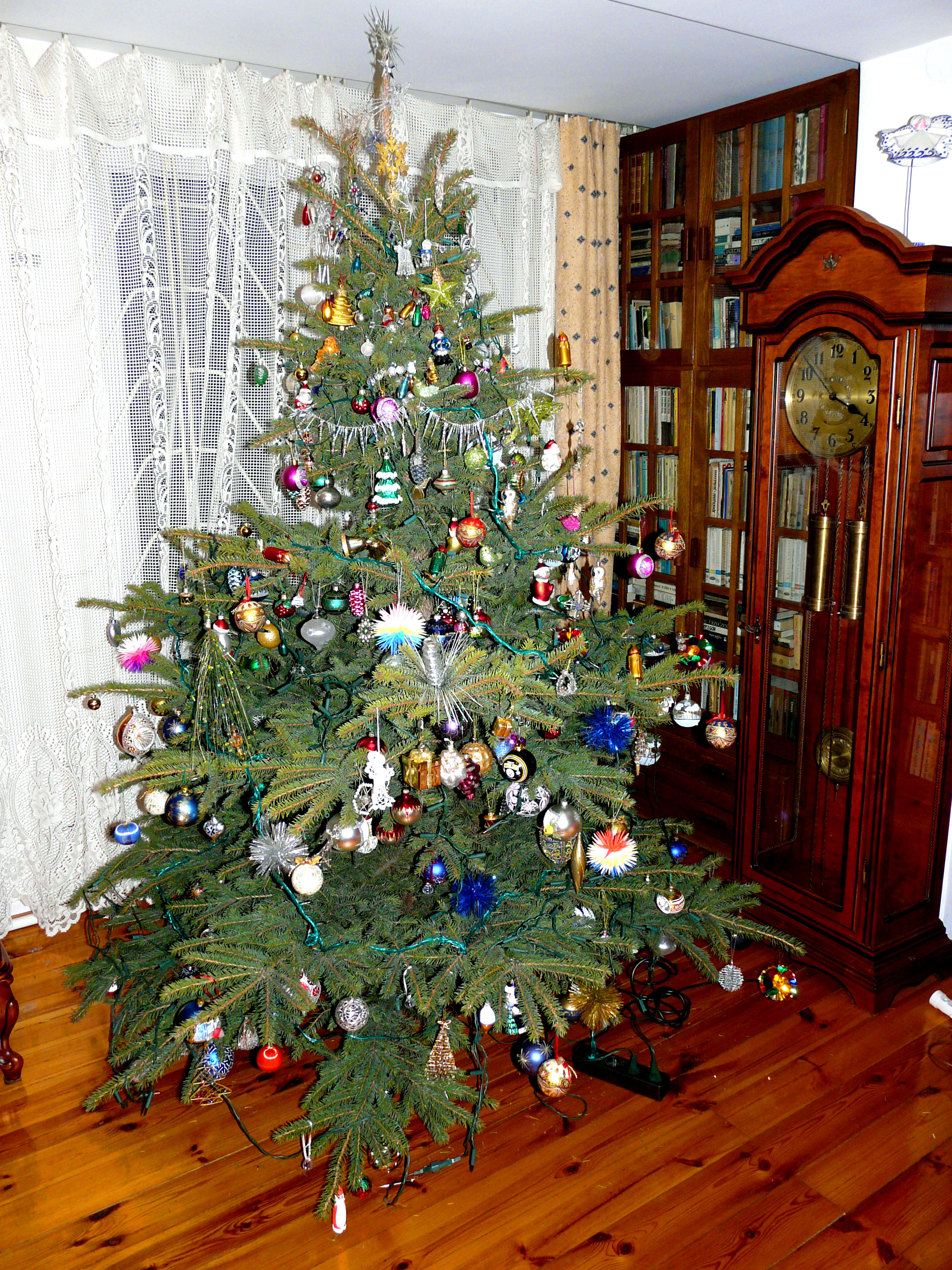
Christmas tree in a Polish home

Children usually decorate the Christmas tree. Sometimes a handful of hay is placed under the tablecloth of the dining table to symbolise Jesus's birth in a manger.

Another tradition is to make an extra place-setting for the "unexpected guest", to celebrate hospitality. The feast begins with saying grace and reading out a passage from the Gospel of Luke (Luke 2:1-14), breaking the opłatek Christmas wafer to symbolize the gift of daily bread, and wishing each other blessings for the coming year. In the country, it was customary to share a special (pink) wafer with livestock and dogs and cats as the animals of the household were to be treated with special reverence on that day, in honour of the animals in the Bethlehem stable. There was a belief that at midnight they were granted the power of human speech.

=== The Wigilia supper ===
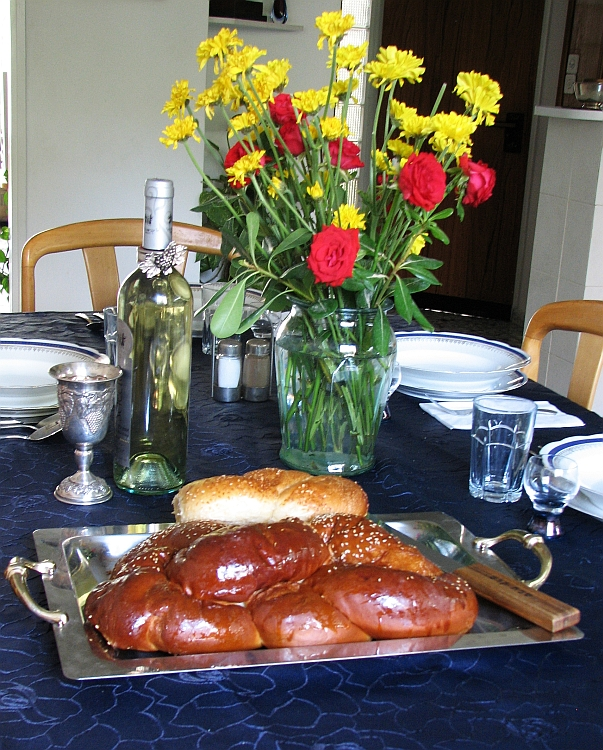
The bread used throughout Wigilia has been borrowed from Shabbat, especially the challah (Polish: chałka)

A Christmas Eve dinner excludes meat, as abstinence is required, and should comprise twelve distinct dishes in memory of the twelve Apostles. It begins with a soup, either borscht with uszka (tortellini), or wild mushroom consommé (grzybowa), followed by herring in different forms. Fish provides the main dish of the Christmas Eve feast across Poland. There are variations of carp fillet, carp in aspic, gefilte fish (Jewish-style carp), sweet with onions, carrots, almonds and raisins or fish in the Greek Style. Side dishes are cabbage, cooked red or sauerkraut with apple salad. The bread served at the meal is often challah, doubtless borrowed from Poland's centuries-long Jewish fellow countrymen. Polish kutia wigilijna, consisting of barley, poppy seeds, honey, and sweetmeats (łakocie) like figs, raisins, and nuts. Then there is an array of desserts, including dried fruit compote, followed by cake: poppy seed cakes, babka, makowiec, and other sweets including edible Christmas ornaments. Regional variants include żurek sour rye soup, siemieniotka (in Silesia), pierogi filled with cheese and potatoes as well as mushrooms and cabbage, stuffed cabbage with mushrooms and rice, gołąbki (cabbage rolls), łazanki, kluski with poppyseed, and makówki (in Silesia). There is in places a belief that whatever happens on Wigilia affects the incoming year; if a quarrel should arise, it foretells a quarrelsome and troublesome year.

==== The Shepherd's mass ====
Some families as well as individual worshippers attend the traditional midnight mass/Shepherd's Mass (pasterka), where Christmas carols are also sung.

A major part of the Wigilia festivities is the opening of gifts. After everyone has finished supper the children often open their gifts and hand out the gifts for the adults from under the tree. The gift-givers in Polish tradition are "Święty Mikołaj" (Saint Nicolas), "Aniołek" (an angel), "Gwiazdka" (a star), "Dzieciątko" (Christkind) in Silesia, Saint Nicholas' feminine counterpart – or the Gwiazdor (masculine), which is either a pagan tradition or represents the little Star of Bethlehem. Saint Nicholas traditionally used to bring gifts on 6 December. This varies and in some families Saint Nicholas brings presents both on the 6th and at Christmas.

=== The Christmas breakfast ===
Christmas Day is a national holiday in Poland and most Poles spend the day with their family. After Wigilia there are two more days of celebrations. Christmas breakfast often consists of baked meats, bigos, cold cuts, smoked or fried salmon, marinated salads, and cakes, especially, pierniki Toruńskie (a gingerbread), cake, and decorated biscuits.

== Gallery ==
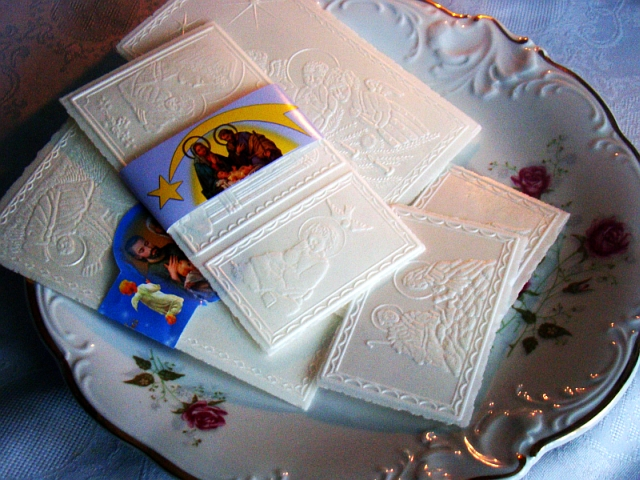
Christmas wafer opłatek symbolizing bread is shared by participants

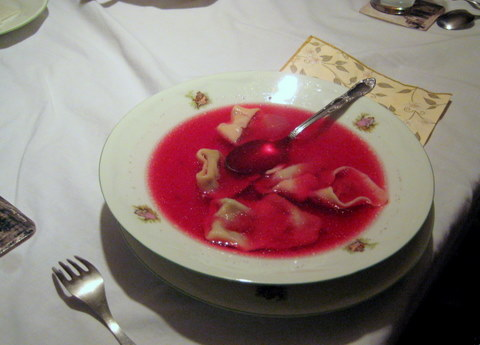
Barszcz with uszka, one of the traditional Wigilia entrées

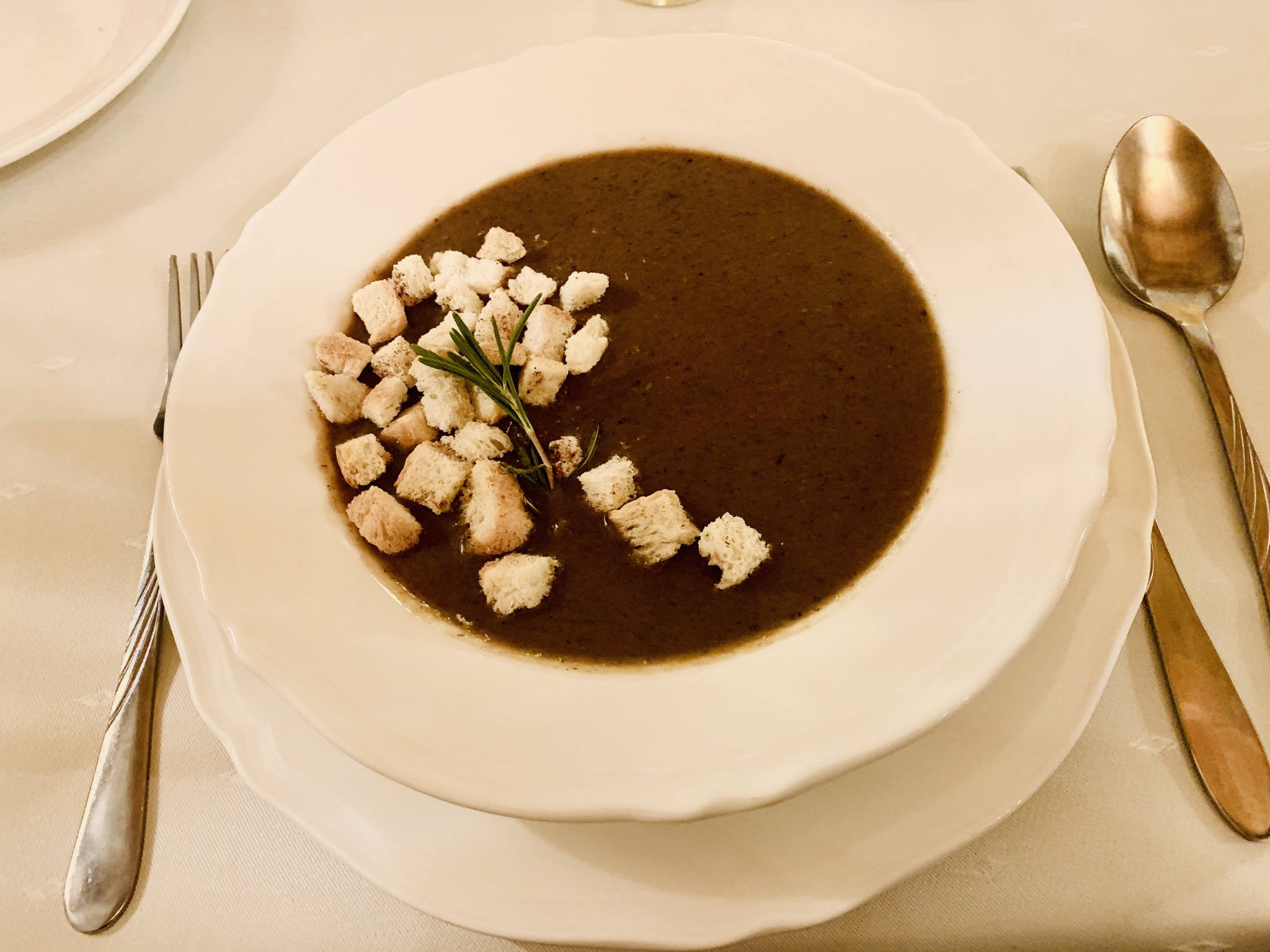
Mushroom soup or consommé is often an alternative for barszcz in parts of Poland

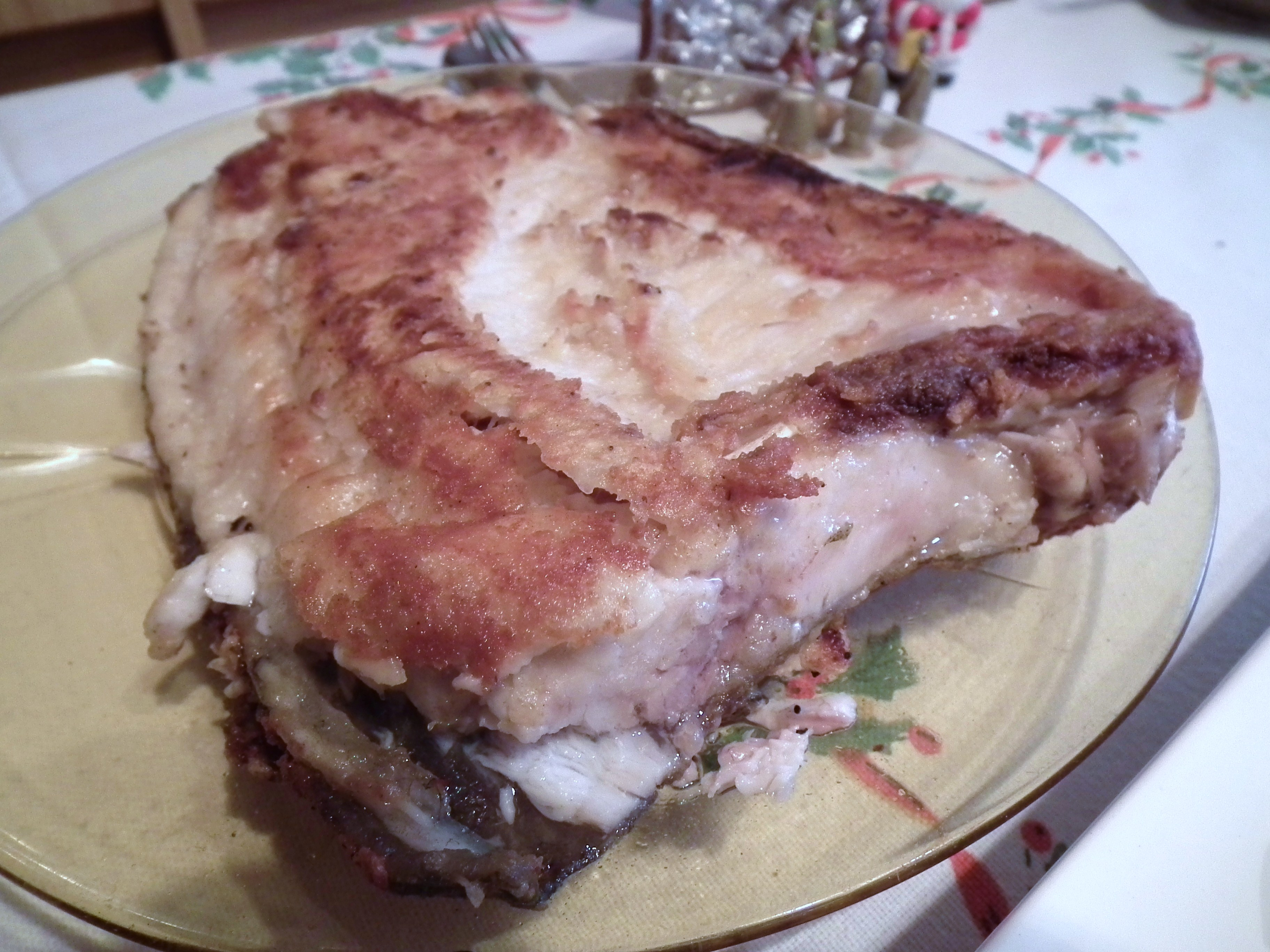
Carp has dominated as a traditional main course and central dish for decades

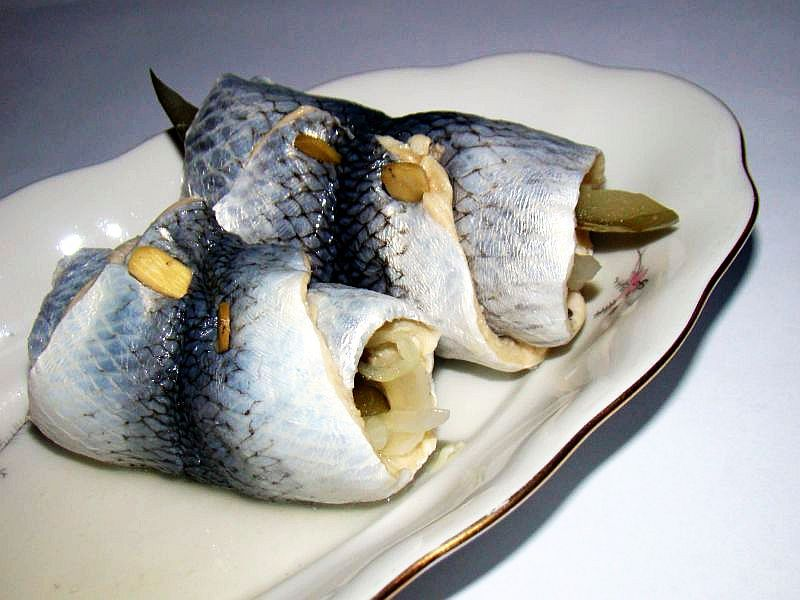
Rollmops, fish commonly served at Wigilia, important as a non-red-meat offering

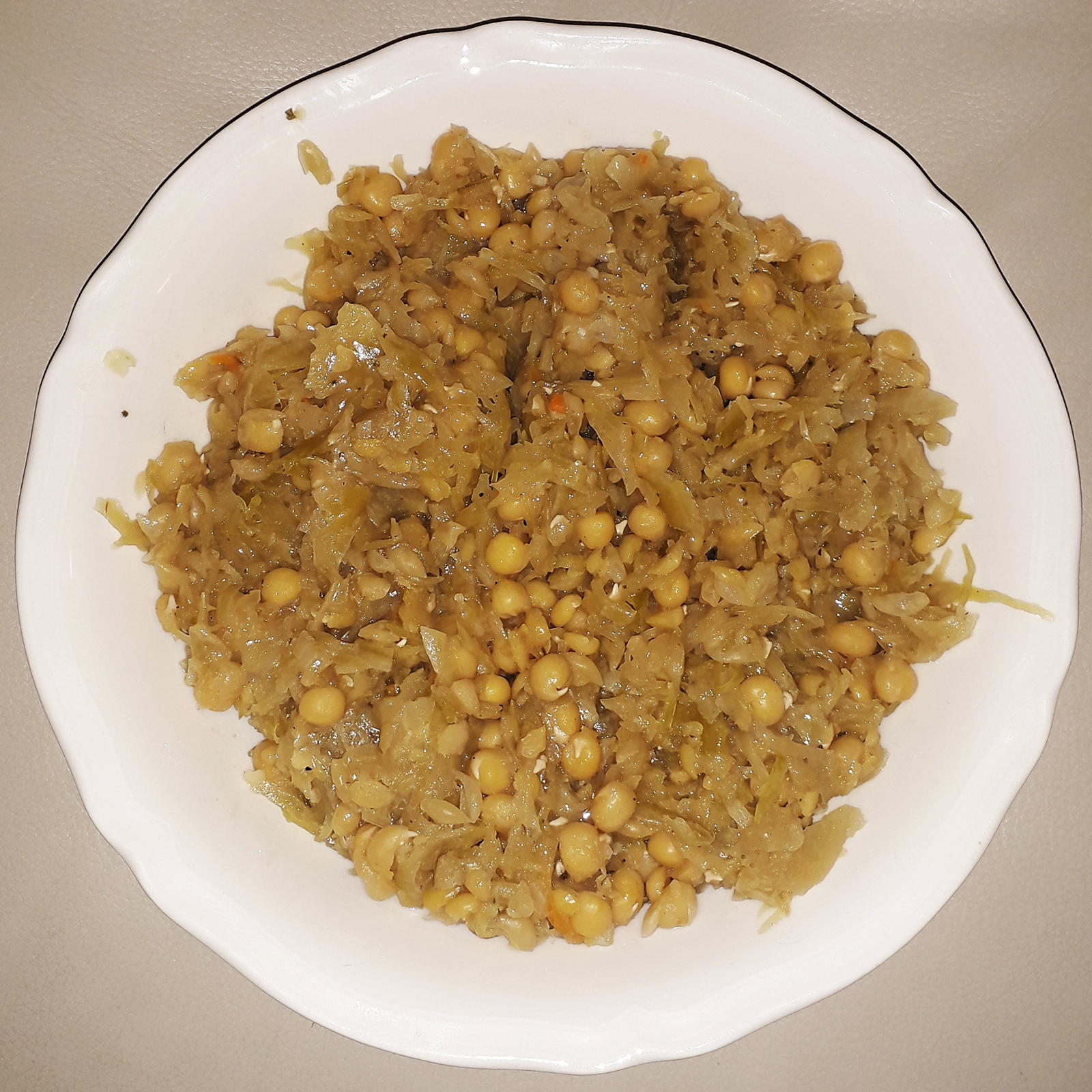
Kapusta z grochem, cooked sauerkraut with yellow split peas or mushrooms

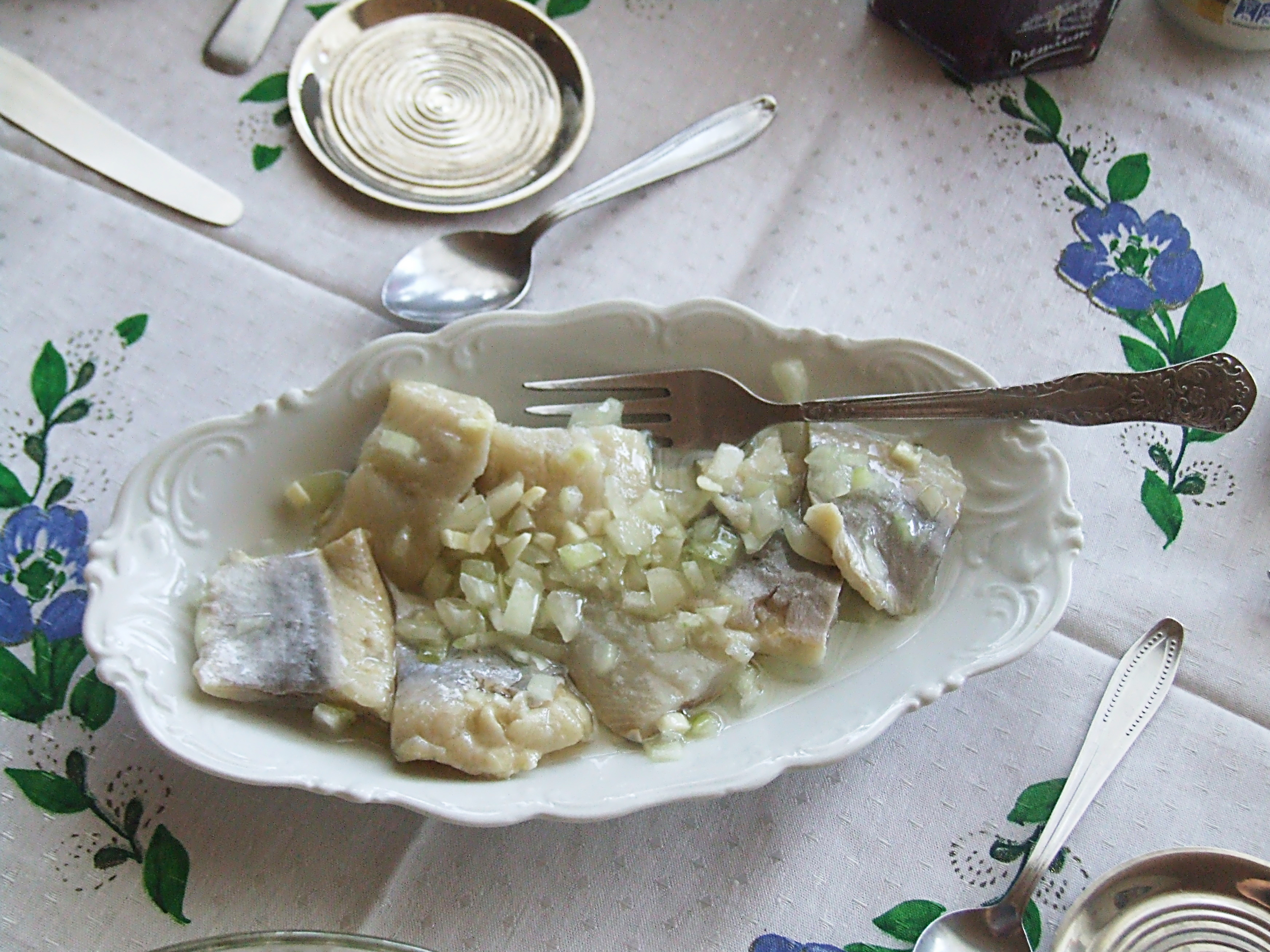
Herring salad with oil and chopped onion as a side dish

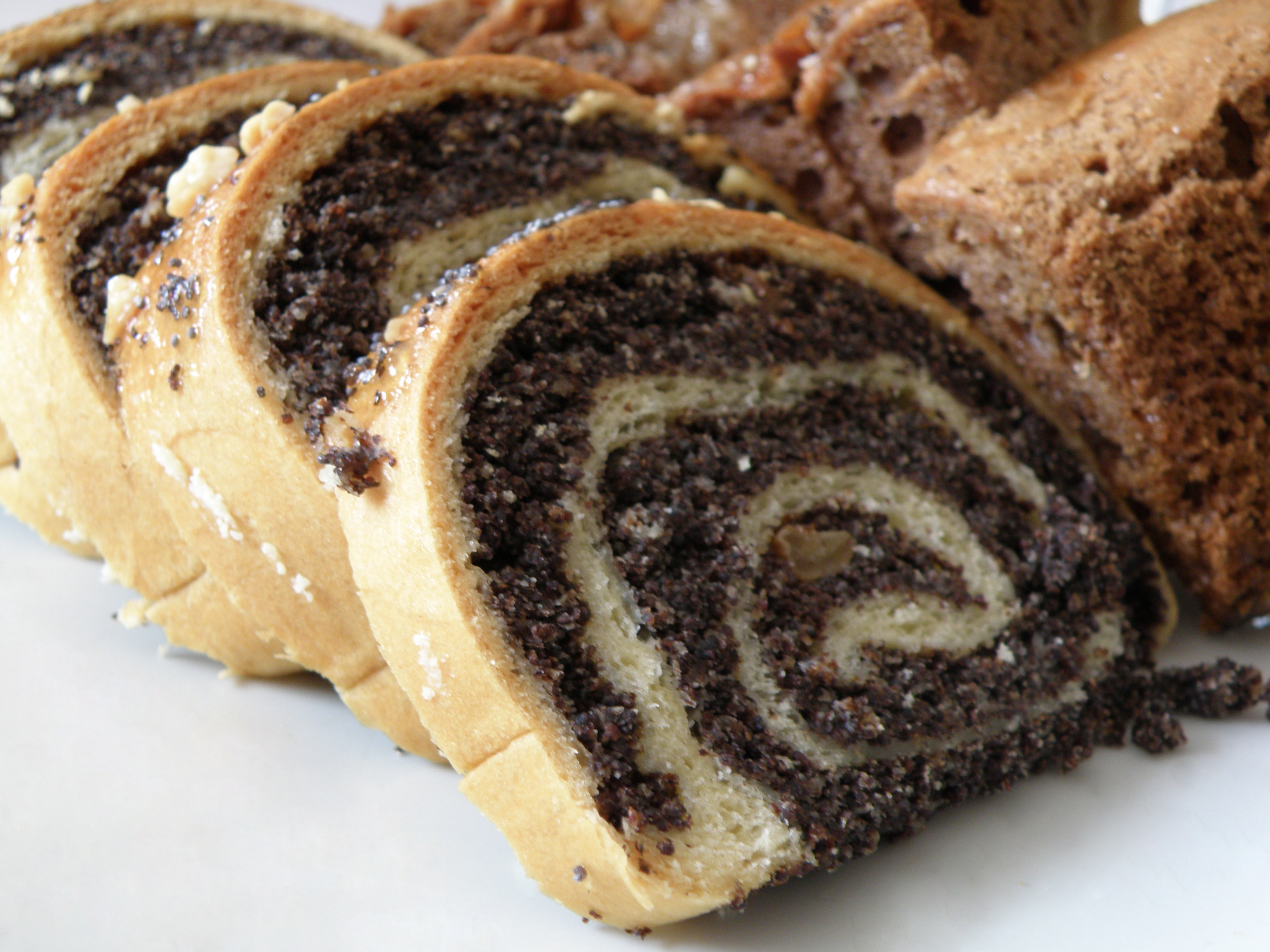
Makowiec, a poppy seed roll is usually served for dessert

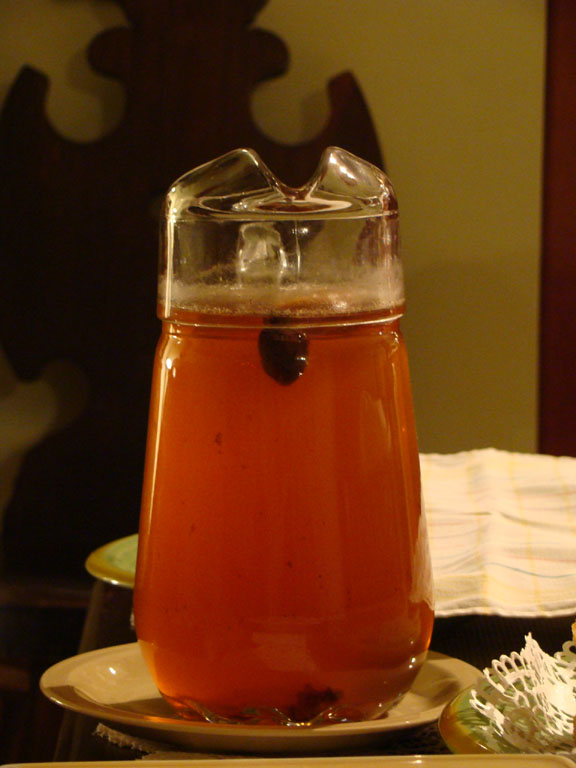
Kompot drink made from dried fruit

== See also ==
- List of dining events
