= Easter basket =

Traditional basket used at Easter

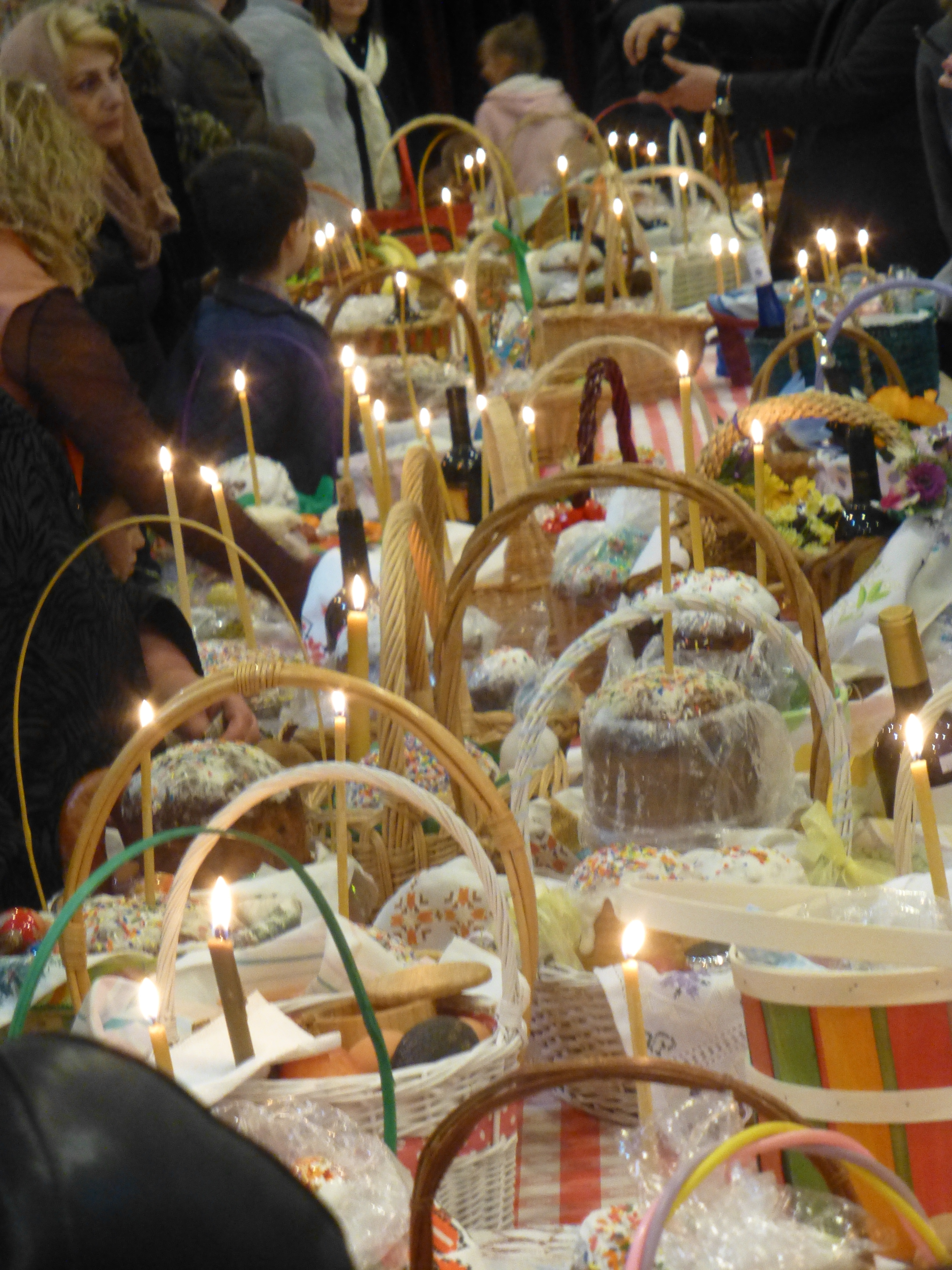
Easter baskets prepared for blessing in an Eastern Orthodox church's hall

An Easter basket, also known as a Paschal basket, is a basket used during the Christian Easter season. In different times and places across the various Christian branches, Easter baskets have served different purposes. For adults, Easter baskets may have deep religious significance and be blessed by a priest. In modern times, the baskets may be filled with food or toys and presented to children as gifts. They are also used by children to gather hidden eggs during egg hunts.

== Traditional ==
=== Eastern Christianity ===
An Easter basket contains the foods traditionally forbidden to consume during Lent (meat, eggs, and dairy products) that is blessed by a priest for breaking the Lenten fast. This continues to be normative in Eastern Christianity and Easter baskets are typically blessed before the midnight service on Holy Saturday, with their contents being consumed at the feast after the service. Traditions for Easter in Eastern European countries often includes blessing of baskets.

=== Western Christianity ===
In parts Western Christianity, emphasis is placed on making a Lenten sacrifice (giving up pleasures such as chocolate and cookies) rather than the traditional abstinence from meat, dairy products, and wine (though a few congregations have revived this practice); (Note: In Western Christianity, certain congregations from various traditions such as Roman Catholic, Methodist and Baptist, have committed themselves to undertaking the Daniel Fast, which enjoins fasting from meat, dairy products, and wine.) as such, in countries of the Western world such as the United States, Easter baskets are filled with Easter eggs and sweets after having abstained from them during Lent. Parents may hide eggs and/or baskets.

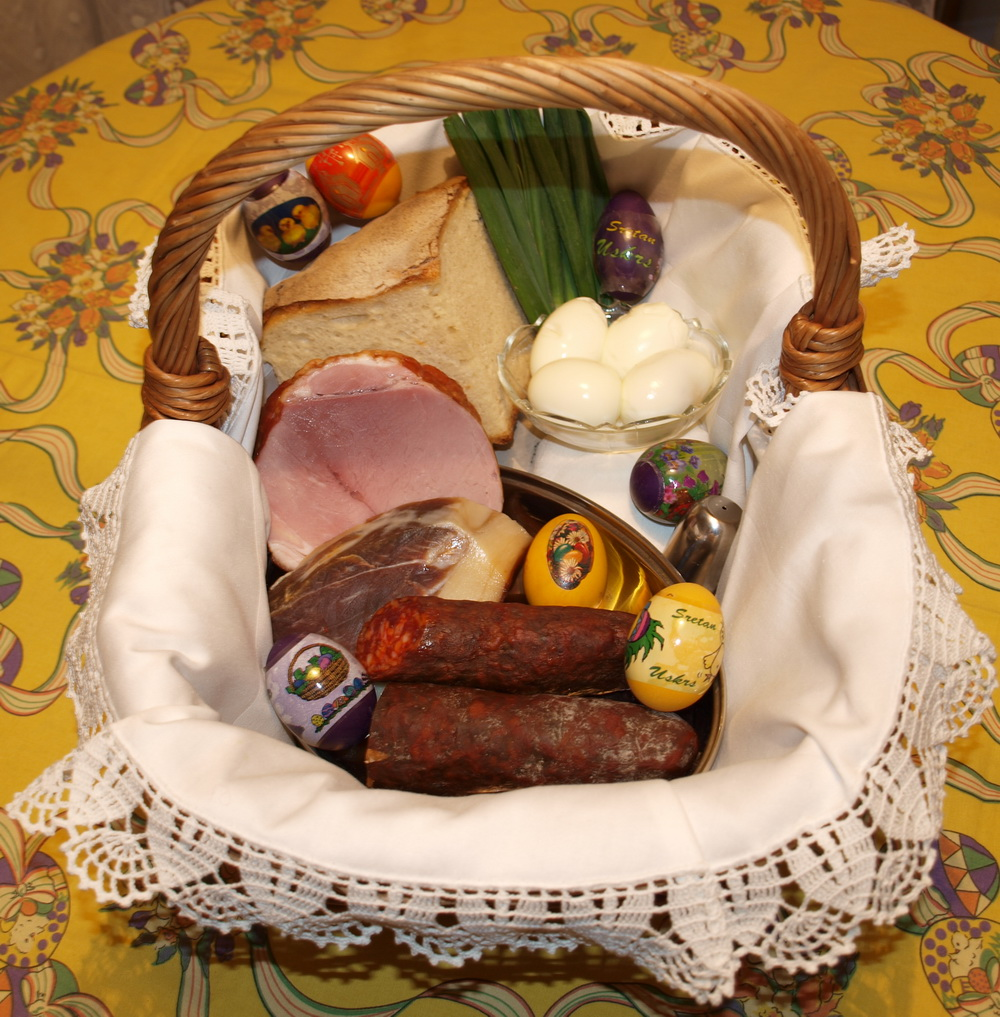
Croatian Easter basket

==== Poland ====
In Poland, Święconka or "the blessing of the Easter baskets" is a central tradition on Holy Saturday. The tradition dates back to the 13-14th century in its earliest form. The basket is traditionally lined with a white linen or lace napkin and decorated with sprigs of boxwood (bukszpan), the typical Easter evergreen. Baskets containing a sampling of Easter foods are brought to church to be blessed on Holy Saturday. After the blessing, the baskets of food are then set aside until Easter morning.

== Modern innovations in the United States ==
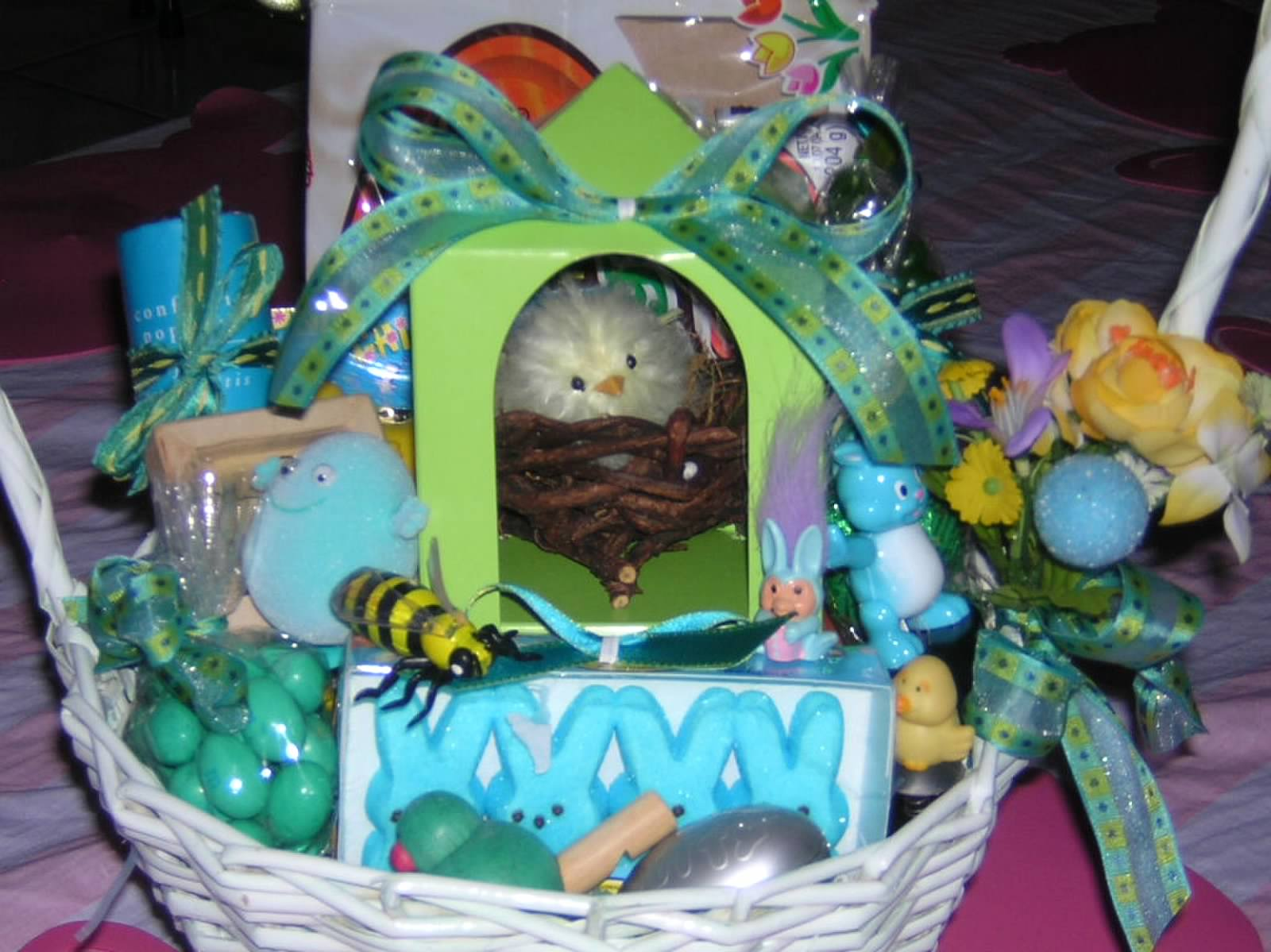
Marshmallow rabbits, candy eggs and other treats in an Easter basket

Congregations and synods belonging to the Evangelical Lutheran Church in America have made Easter baskets to be given to needy children or elderly persons. These have been filled with Easter eggs, candy, and toys.
