= God Is Born =

Polish Christmas carol

^{"}Bóg się rodzi^{"}
God Is Born
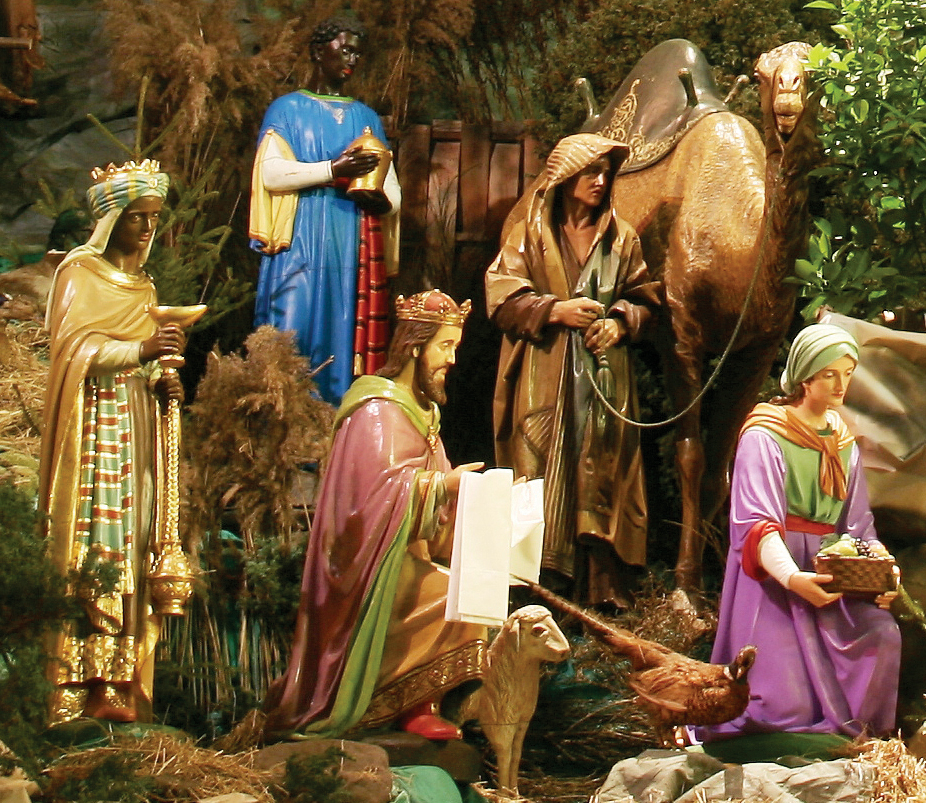
- Nativity scene of Poland. Crib in Katowice

Polish Christmas carol
- Lyrics: Franciszek Karpiński
- Composer: unknown
- Written: 1792

"Bóg się rodzi" (English: "God Is Born", Polish pronunciation: [buk ɕɛ rɔdʑi]) is a Polish Christmas carol (Polish: kolęda), with lyrics written by Franciszek Karpiński in 1792. Its stately melody (the composer has not been established) is traditionally known to be a coronation polonaise for Polish Kings dating back as far as during the reign of Stefan Batory in the 16th century. The carol is regarded by some as the National Christmas hymn of Poland, and, for a short time, it was also considered a national anthem, for instance by poet Jan Lechoń. It has also been called "one of the most beloved Polish Christmas carols".

The carol was published for the first time in a compilation of Karpiński's works entitled Pieśni nabożne (Songs of Piety) in 1792. The book was printed by the Basilian monks printing shop in Supraśl. However, the hymn had been publicly presented already a few years earlier, in the Old Basilica in Białystok, as Karpiński lived in Białystok's Branicki Palace in the years from 1785 to 1818. First presentation of the carol is now commemorated by a tablet, located on the wall of the church. The tablet reads: In this church, for the first time ever, Songs of Piety by Franciszek Karpiński were performed. The original title of the carol is Pieśń o Narodzeniu Pańskim (On God's Nativity or Song of the birth of our Lord).

== Structure ==
"Bóg się rodzi"
Lyrics by Franciszek Karpiński, 1792.

The carol consists of five verses, each verse with eight lines, and each line with eight syllables. The hymn can be characterized as a rhetorical tautology, which is visible while analyzing the text (God is born, power is trembling: Lord of the Heaven bared. Fire’s solidifying, light is darkening, the infinite is bounded). These apparently oxymoronic figures of speech are used deliberately, to emphasize the importance of the miracle which took place in the shed. Lyrics of the carol are also supported by quotation from the Gospel of John (Word-Turned-Flesh to prove the Story, lived among us, born of Heaven). Additionally, Karpiński inserted a patriotic message, as the fifth verse begins with an appeal to Baby Jesus (Raise Your hand now, Child of Glory, bless our homeland now and ever).

"Bóg się rodzi" was the carol on which Pope John Paul II based his talk during the traditional exchange of Christmas greetings on 23 December 1996 at the Paul VI Auditorium. The Pope cited the words of the hymn saying, "The poet presented the mystery of the Incarnation of God's Son, using contrasts to express what is essential to the mystery: in assuming human nature, the infinite God at the same time assumed the limitations of a creature".

The hymn has been performed by several popular Polish artists, including Anna Maria Jopek, Violetta Villas, Michał Bajor, Krzysztof Krawczyk and Eleni Tzoka. It was sung by Polish prisoners of the Auschwitz concentration camp; an account by an inmate named Jozef Jedrych, kept in the Auschwitz Museum collections, describes how "the singing of German carols began, and then like the waves of the sea came the powerful words [from a Polish carol] ‘God is born, the powers tremble’."

=== In popular culture ===
An instrumental rendition of this song is featured in the "Brave New World" expansion pack of Civilization V. It is the theme of the Polish civilization, which is led by Casimir III.

== Text ==
Original Polish, and English translation. https://www.tekstowo.pl/piosenka,koleda,bog_sie_rodzi.html

== See also ==
- Pasterka culmination of Christmas in Poland
- List of Christmas carols
- Christmas music
- Hymn (song of praise)
- Kolęda (also known as Koliada in Slavic Europe)
