= Święconka =

Polish Easter tradition

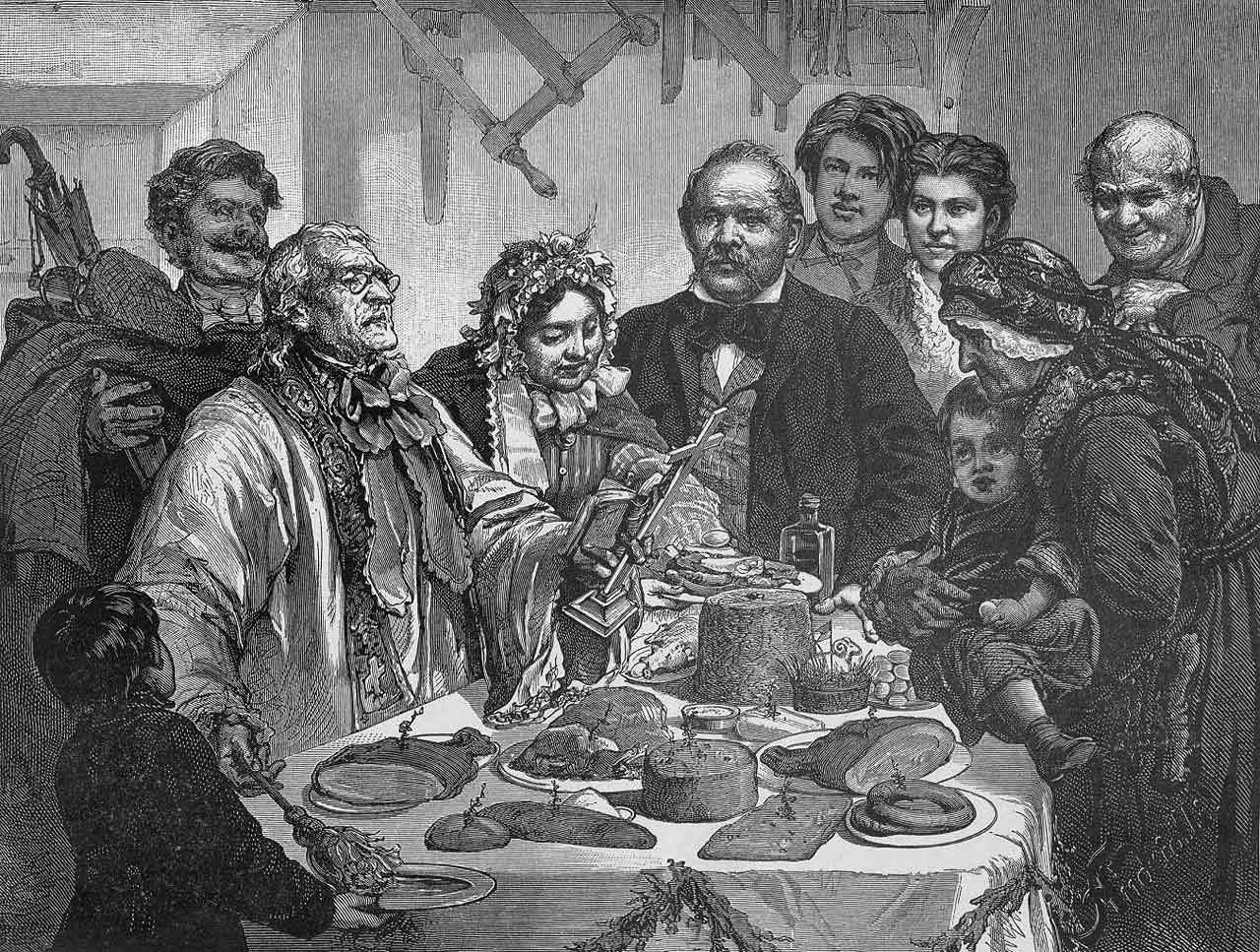
Food blessing in the 19th century, by Michał Elwiro Andriolli

Święconka (pronounced [ɕfjɛnˈt͡sɔnka]), meaning "the blessing of the Easter baskets", is one of the most enduring and beloved Polish traditions on Holy Saturday during Easter. With roots dating back to the early history of Poland, it is also observed by expatriate and their descendants Poles in the United States, Canada, the United Kingdom, Ireland, Sweden and other Polish communities in the world.

== Origins ==
The tradition of food blessing at Easter, which has early-medieval roots in Christian society. The tradition is said to date from the 7th century in its basic form, the more modern form containing bread and eggs (symbols of resurrection and Christ) are said to date from the 12th century.

== Modern times ==
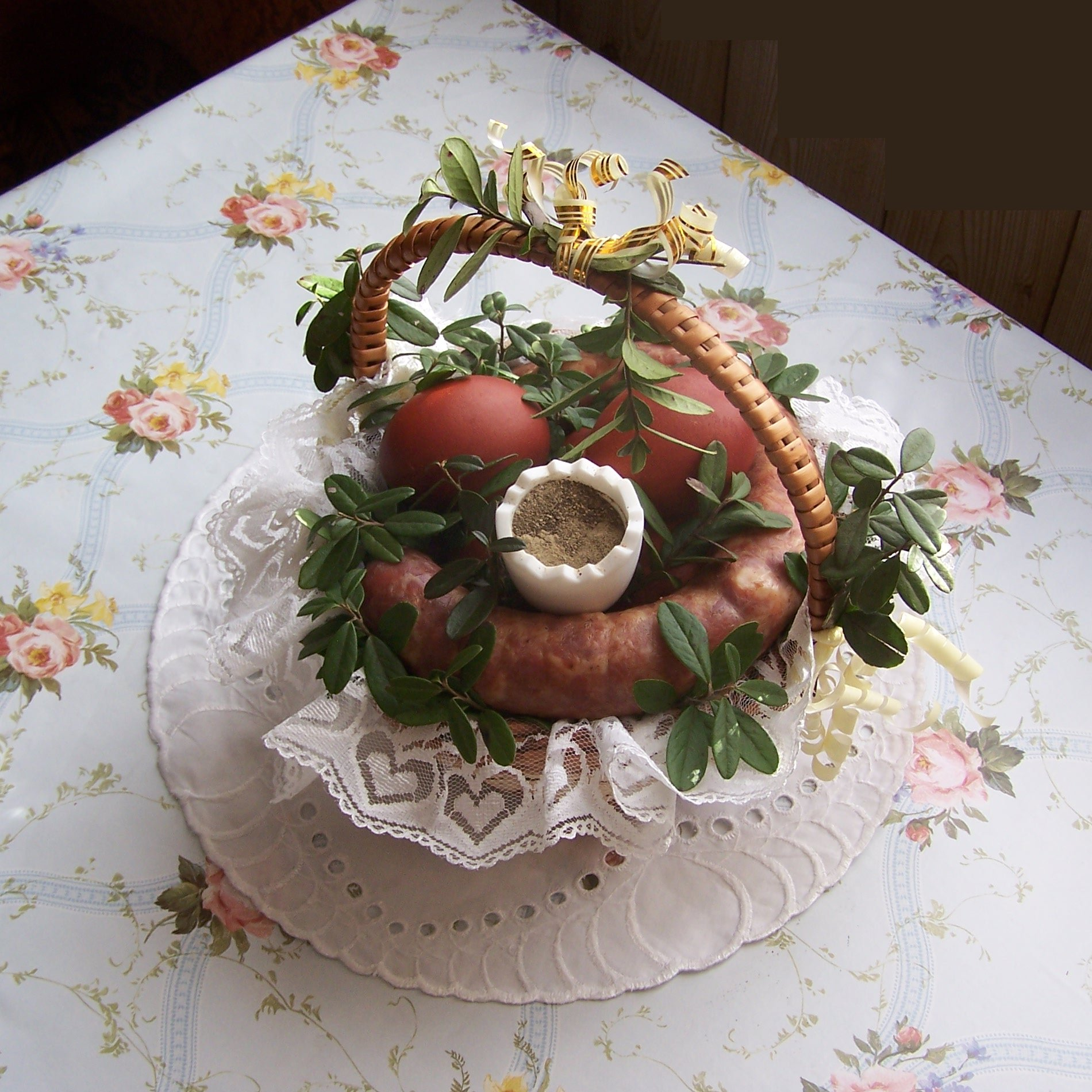
A typical "Święconka" basket of Polish Holy Saturday tradition

Baskets containing a sampling of Easter foods are brought to church to be blessed on Holy Saturday. The basket is traditionally lined with a white linen or lace napkin and decorated with sprigs of boxwood (bukszpan), the typical Easter evergreen and/or bazie/kotki willow branches. Celebrating this occasion for Poles means preparing a basket with crisp white linens or lace occasionally embroidered for the occasion, and boxwood and ribbon sometimes woven through the handle. Observing the creativity of other parishioners is one of the special joys of the event. The tradition of blessing Easter basket is a central part of Easter in Poland and for Polonia abroad.

While in some older or rural communities, the priest visits the home to bless the foods, the vast majority of Poles and Polish Americans visit the church on Holy Saturday, praying at the Tomb of the Lord (the fourteenth and final Station of the Cross). The Blessing of the Food is, however, a festive occasion. The three-part blessing prayers specifically address the various contents of the baskets, with special prayers for the meats, eggs, cakes and breads. The priest or deacon then sprinkles the individual baskets with holy water.

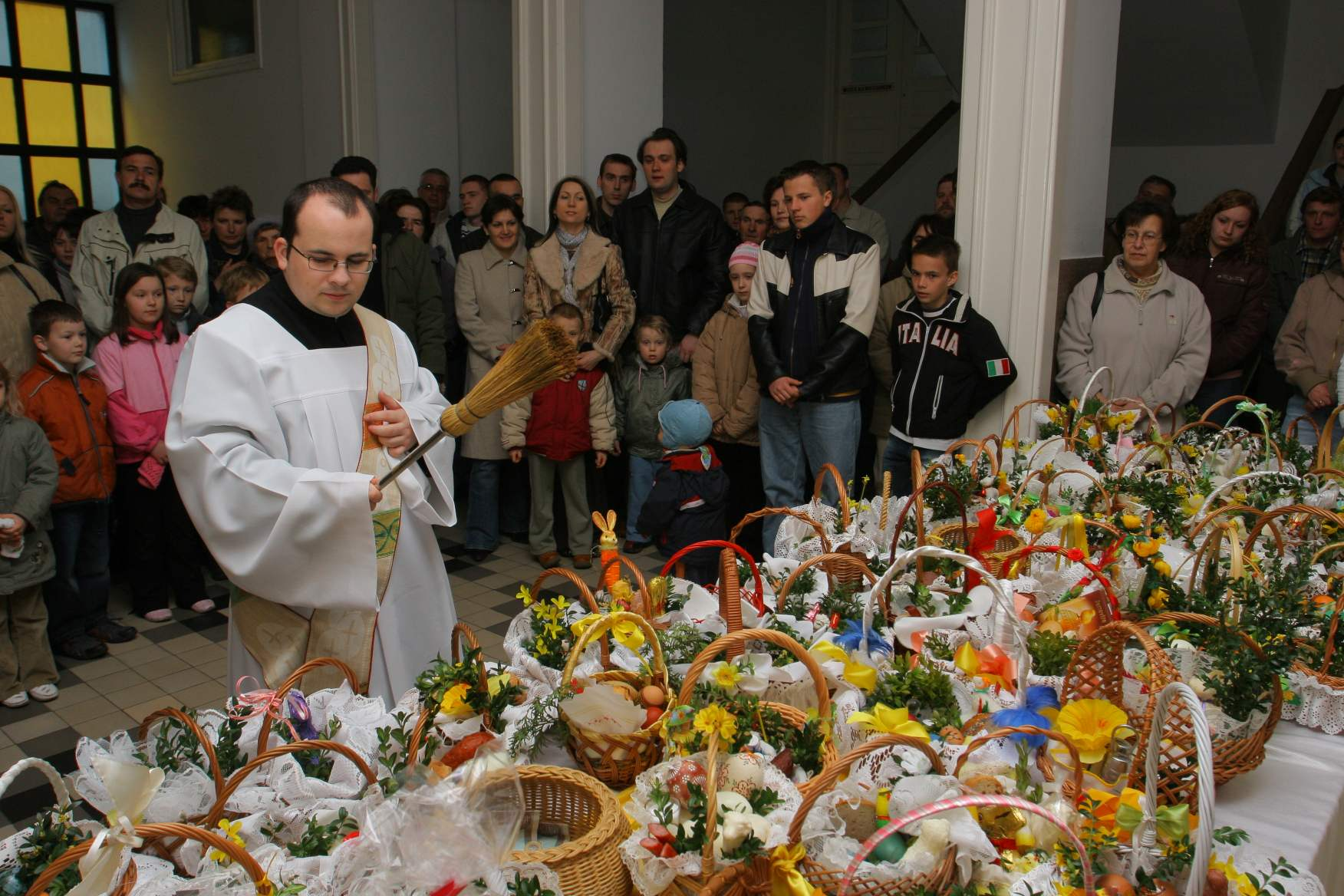
Modern ceremony in Poland led by a Catholic deacon, 2007

More traditional Polish churches use a straw brush for aspersing the water; others use the more modern metal holy water sprinkling wand. In some parishes, the baskets are lined up on long tables; in others, parishioners process to the front of the altar carrying their baskets, as if in a Communion line. Older generations of Polish Americans, descended from early 19th-century immigrants, tend to bless whole meal quantities, often brought to church halls or cafeterias in large hampers and picnic baskets.

The foods in the baskets have a symbolic meaning:

- eggs – symbolise life and Christ's resurrection
- bread – symbolises Jesus
- ham or sausage – symbol of great joy and abundance
- salt – represents purification
- horseradish – symbolic of the bitter sacrifice of Christ
- white lamb figure – represents Christ
- cake (rarely) – just like bread is the symbol of Jesus Christ.

The food blessed in the church remains untouched according to local traditions until Sunday morning.

== See also ==
- Easter basket
- Easter egg
- Egg decorating in Slavic culture
- Pisanka (Polish)
