= Franciszek Karpiński =

Polish poet (1741–1825)

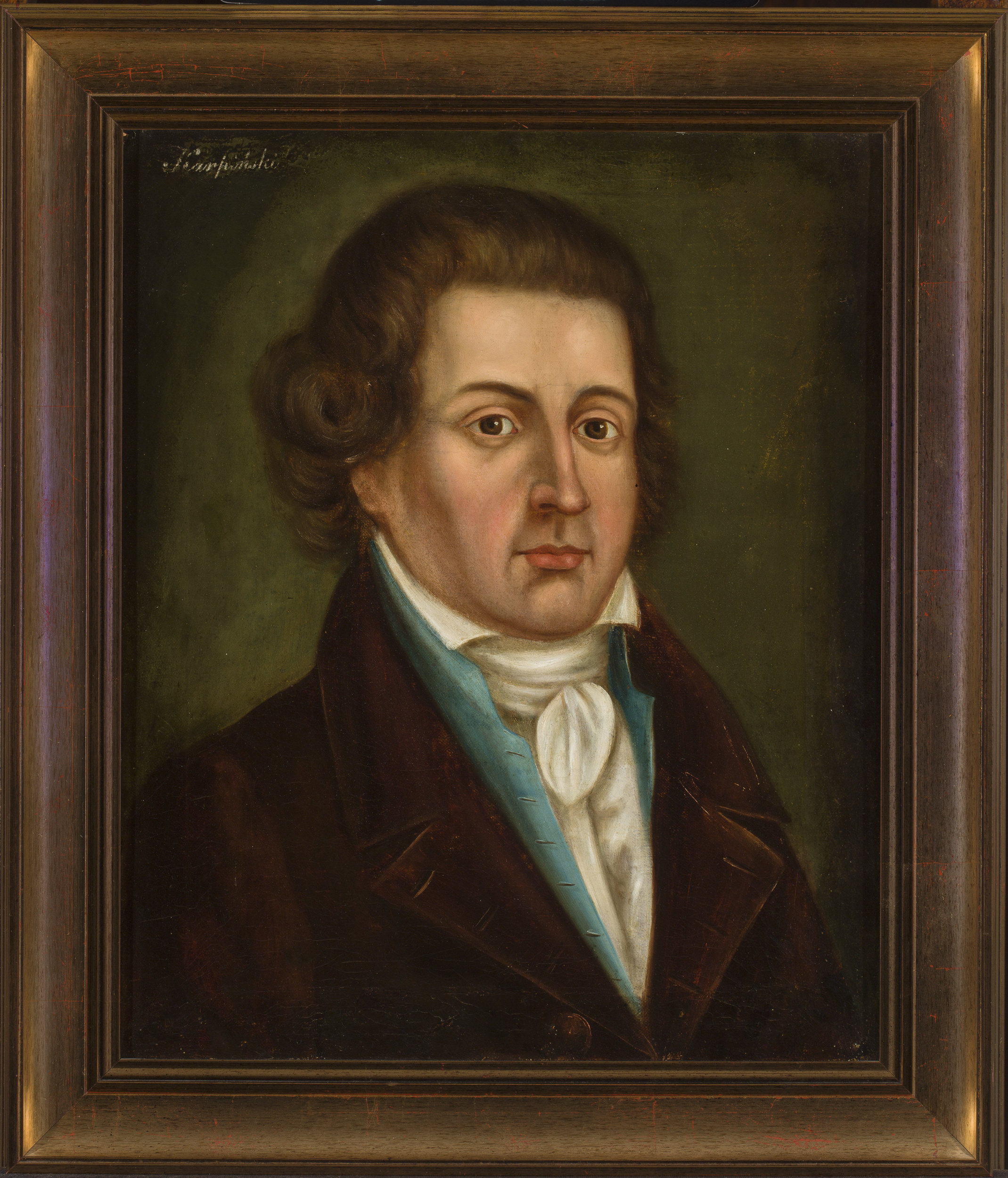
Franciszek Karpiński

Franciszek Karpiński (4 October 1741 – 16 September 1825) was the leading sentimental Polish poet of the Age of Enlightenment. He is particularly remembered for his religious works later rendered as hymns and carols. He is also considered one of the most original Polish writers of the early partitions. In his native Poland he was cherished during the Polish Romantic Period of the early 19th century.

== Life ==
Karpiński was born in 1741 in Hołosków (Holoskiv) near Kolomyia and educated at Stanisławów (then the territory of the Polish–Lithuanian Commonwealth, now Ivano-Frankivsk in western Ukraine). He attended university in Lwow, obtaining the title of Doctor of Philosophy. He spent a further eighteen months in Vienna, where he studied foreign languages. His first employment was as tutor in the magnate courts.

In 1780, his first volume of poetry came to the attention of the powerful Czartoryski family. Under their patronage, he travelled to Warsaw to become secretary to Prince Adam Kazimierz Czartoryski. He wrote three books of poetry, which saw great popularity, but after a few years he became disillusioned by the hypocrisy prevalent in the capital, and retired back to the Polish Kresy (Eastern Borderlands) countryside, by then under the Austrian partition.

Between 1785 and 1818 he worked as a tutor to the Branicki family in Białystok. There he wrote some of his most famous works, including "Bóg się rodzi, moc truchleje" ("God is Born, Power Trembles") and "Kiedy ranne wstają zorze" ("When the Morning Lights Arise"). It was primarily those religious and patriotic songs, hymns and carols that would be sung by later generations and immortalize his works in Poland. In 1800 he became a member of the newly formed Society of Friends of Science.

Several of his poems make romantic references to one "Justina"; for this he was known as "Justina's lover" during his lifetime. Some speculate he nicknamed all of his loves Justina, and that he referred to at least three different women by this name.

In 1818, he retired to a manor near Wołkowysk (now Vawkavysk in Belarus), where he wrote his memoirs. He died on 16 September 1825.

Franciszek Karpiński is buried in Łysków (currently Lyskava in Pruzhany District, Belarus).

== See also ==
- Enlightenment in Poland
- Polish poetry
