= Easter in Italy =

Easter celebrations and traditions in Italy

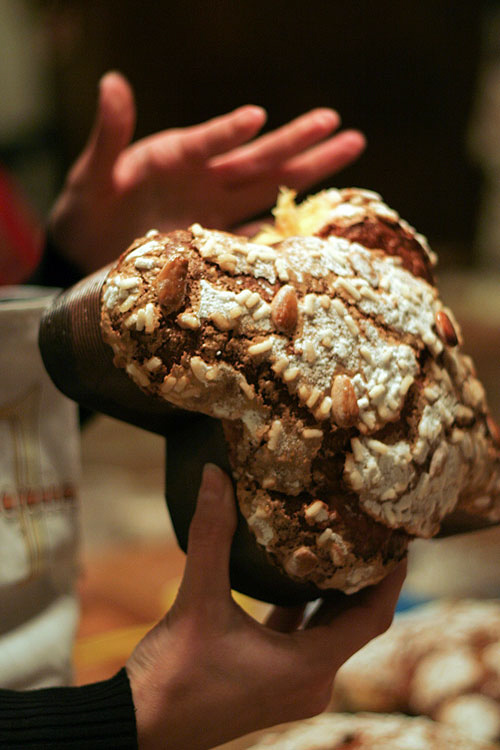
Italian traditional Easter cake, the Colomba di Pasqua. It is the Easter counterpart of the two well-known Italian Christmas desserts, panettone and pandoro

Easter in Italy (Italian: Pasqua, pronounced [ˈpaskwa]) is one of the country's major holidays. Easter in Italy enters Holy Week with Palm Sunday, Maundy Thursday, Good Friday and Holy Saturday, concluding with Easter Day and Easter Monday. Each day has a special significance. The Holy Weeks worthy of note in Italy are the Processione dei Misteri di Trapani, the Holy Week in Barcellona Pozzo di Gotto and the Holy Week in Ruvo di Puglia.

Traditional Italian dishes for the Easter period are abbacchio, cappello del prete, casatiello, Colomba di Pasqua, pastiera, penia, pizza di Pasqua and pizzelle. Abbacchio is an Italian preparation of lamb typical of the Roman cuisine. It is a product protected by the European Union with the PGI mark. Eating lamb at Easter has a religious meaning; in particular, eating lamb at Easter commemorates the Death and Resurrection of Jesus. Colomba di Pasqua (English: "Easter Dove") is an Italian traditional Easter bread, the Easter counterpart of the two well-known Italian Christmas desserts, panettone and pandoro.

In Florence, the unique custom of the Scoppio del carro is observed in which a holy fire lit from stone shards from the Holy Sepulchre are used to light a fire during the singing of the Gloria of the Easter Sunday Mass, which is used to ignite a rocket in the form of a dove, representing peace and the Holy Spirit, which following a wire in turn lights a cart containing pyrotechnics in the small square before the cathedral. The Cavallo di fuoco is an historical reconstruction which takes place in the city of Ripatransone in the Province of Ascoli Piceno. It is a fireworks show, which traditionally occurs eight days after Easter.

== Carnival ==
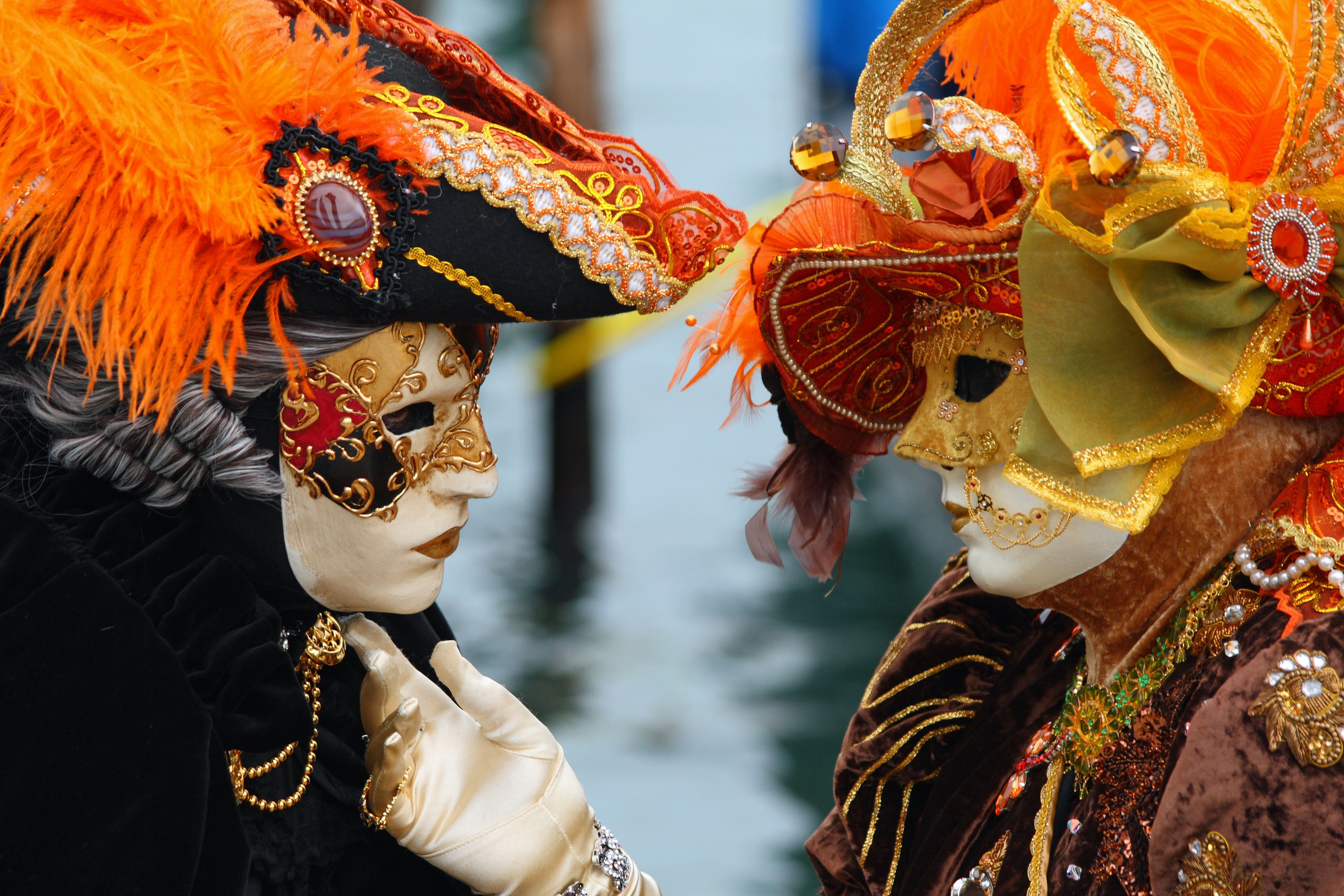
Distinctive Venetian masks at the Carnival of Venice

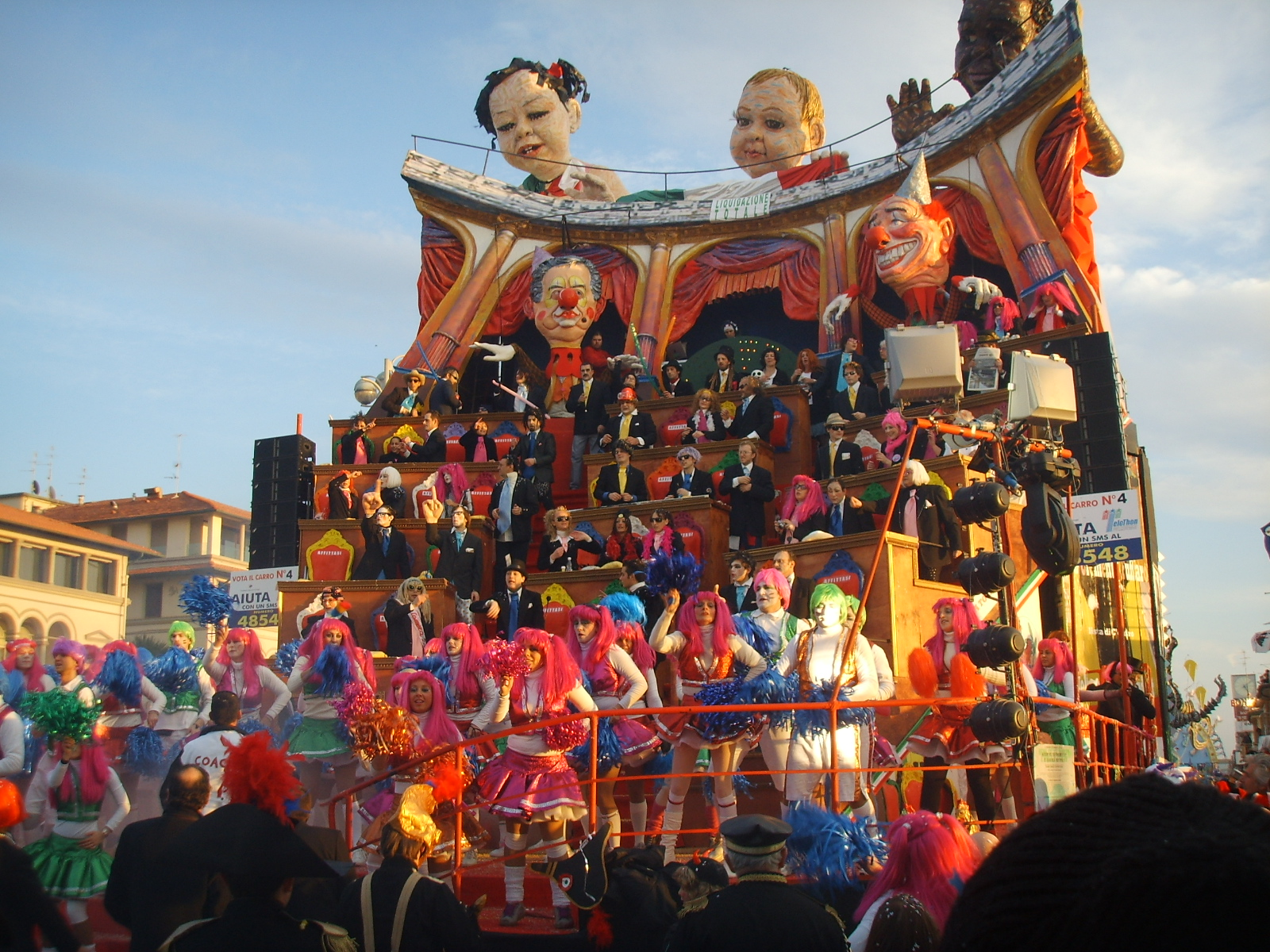
Carnival of Viareggio 2011, Uer iz de parti?

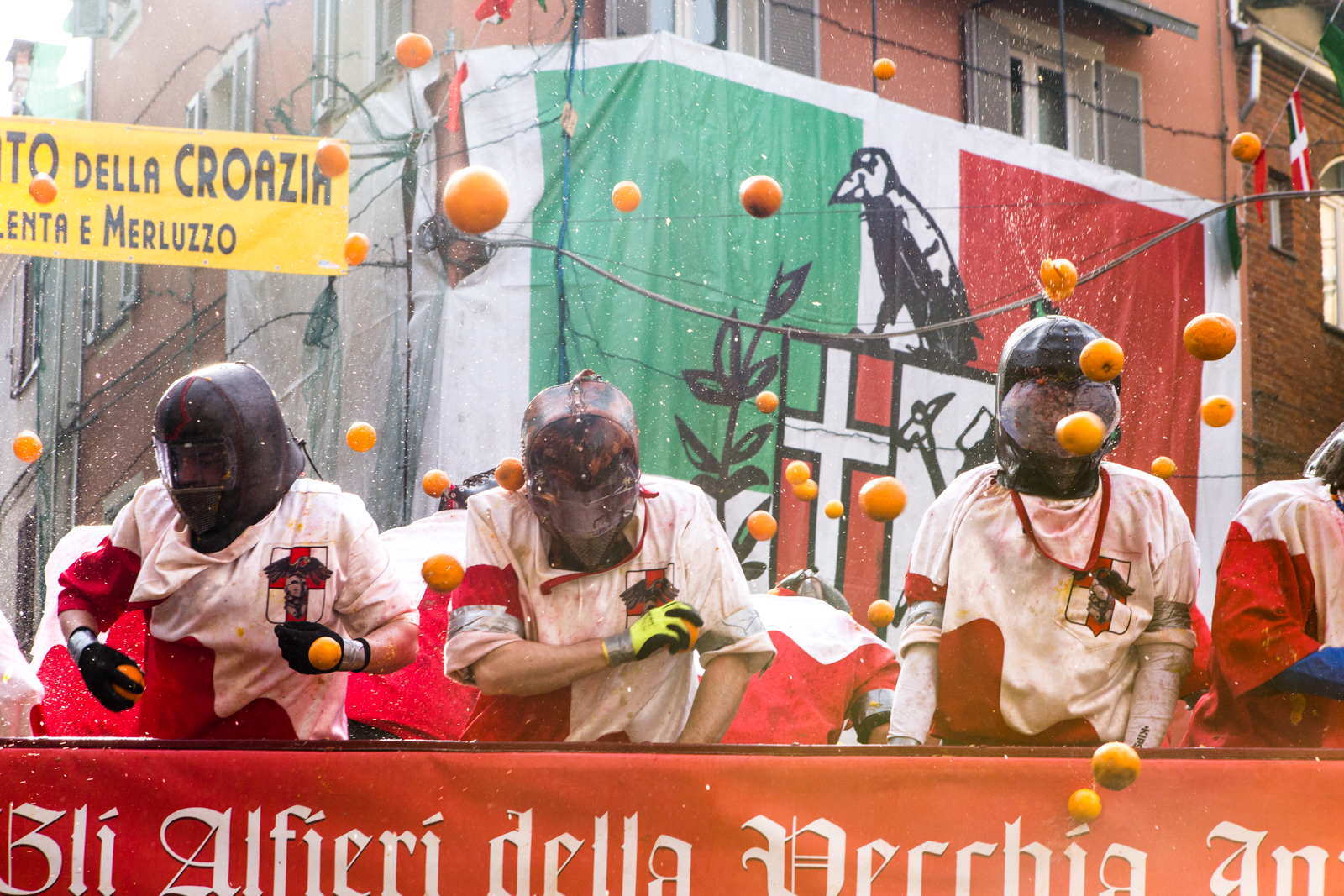
The Battle of the Oranges at the Carnival of Ivrea, in Ivrea

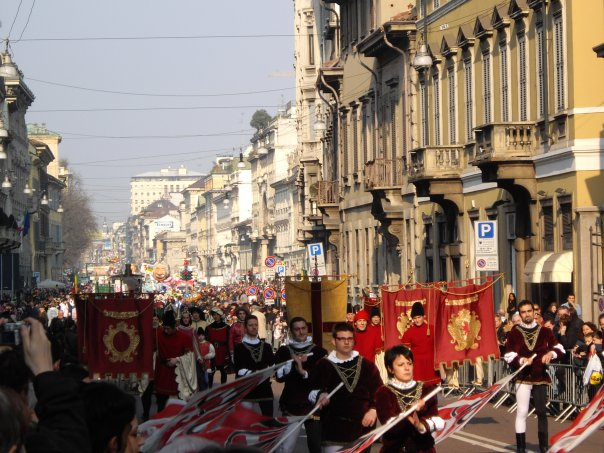
Ambrosian carnival in Milan

Carnival in Italy is a farewell party to eat, drink, and have fun before the limitations and solemnity of Lent. About a month before Ash Wednesday, Italians celebrate over many weekends with parades, masks, and confetti. The origins of this event may be traced to ancient Greece and Rome, when they worshipped Bacchus and Saturn. Some think they date back to archaic winter-to-spring ceremonies. Despite its pagan origins, the event was so extensively celebrated and the tradition so powerful that it was swiftly altered to fit into Catholic rituals. Carnival in Italy is traditionally celebrated on Fat Tuesday, but the weekend prior features activities as well.

Carnival traditions vary across Italy. In the Ambrosian rite regions around Milan, Carnival ends on the first Sunday of Lent. The Carnival of Venice and Carnival of Viareggio are particularly renowned, featuring sophisticated masquerades and parades. In Sardinia, a distinct carnival form survives, possibly rooted in pre-Christian winter rituals of awakening the earth. These Carnivals include masquerades and parades.

The Carnival in Venice was first documented in 1296, with a proclamation by the Venetian Senate announcing a public festival the day before the start of Lent. Its subversive nature is reflected in Italy's many laws over the centuries attempting to restrict celebrations and the wearing of masks. Carnival celebrations in Venice were halted after the city fell under Austrian control in 1798, but were revived in the late 20th century.

The Carnival of Viareggio is the second-most popular in Italy. It lasts a month with night and day celebrations, floats, parades, district celebrations, masked dances, and other shows. The first masquerade took place in 1873, in response to the upper classes' dissatisfaction with having to pay hefty taxes. Thousands of travelers go to Italy for parades, Carnival masks and costumes, concerts, and music. In 2001, the town built a new "Carnival citadel" dedicated to Carnival preparations and entertainment.

The Carnival of Ivrea is famous for its "Battle of the Oranges" fought with fruit between the people on foot and the troops of the tyrant on carts, to remember the wars of the Middle Ages, allegory of struggle for freedom. It is considered one of the most ancient Carnivals in the world. The fight commemorates Ivrea's rebellion against tyrannical rule in the Middle Ages. The miller's daughter, "la Mugnaia", allegedly killed the city's dictator after he tried to kidnap her, sparking an uprising that gave the inhabitants more freedom. Ivrea's Carnival celebration now includes parades in medieval costumes, folkloric ensembles, and musical performances from Italy and Europe. While enjoying the festive ambiance, don't forget to try the traditional Carnival dish, fagiolata, a delicious bean soup.

The Ambrosian Rite (Italian: rito ambrosiano) is a Latin liturgical rite of the Catholic Church and the Eastern Orthodox Church (specifically The Divine Liturgy of Saint Ambrose). The rite is named after Saint Ambrose, a bishop of Milan in the fourth century. It is used by around five million Catholics in the greater part of the Archdiocese of Milan (excluding Monza, Treviglio and Trezzo sull'Adda), in some parishes of the Diocese of Como, Bergamo, Novara, Lodi, in the Diocese of Lugano, Canton of Ticino, Switzerland, less prominently in some Western Rite orthodox parishes and on special occasions of other jurisdictions. In the most part of the Archdiocese of Milan, the Carnival lasts four more days, ending on the Saturday after Ash Wednesday, because of the Ambrosian Rite.

In Sardinia, the Carnival (in Sardinian language Carrasecare or Carrasegare) varies greatly from the one in the mainland of Italy. the majority of the Sardinian celebrations features not only feasts and parades but also crude fertility rites such as bloodsheds to fertilize the land, the death and the resurrection of the Carnival characters and representations of violence and torture. The typical characters of the Sardinian Carnival are zoomorphic and/or androgynous, such as the Mamuthones and Issohadores from Mamoiada, the Boes and Merdules from Ottana and many more. The Carnival is celebrated with street performances that are typically accompanied by Sardinian dirges called attittidus, meaning literally "cry of a baby when the mother doesn't want nursed him/her anymore" (from the word titta meaning breasts). Other particular and important Carnival instances in Sardinia are the Sartiglia in Oristano and the Tempio Pausania Carnival.

== Holy Week ==
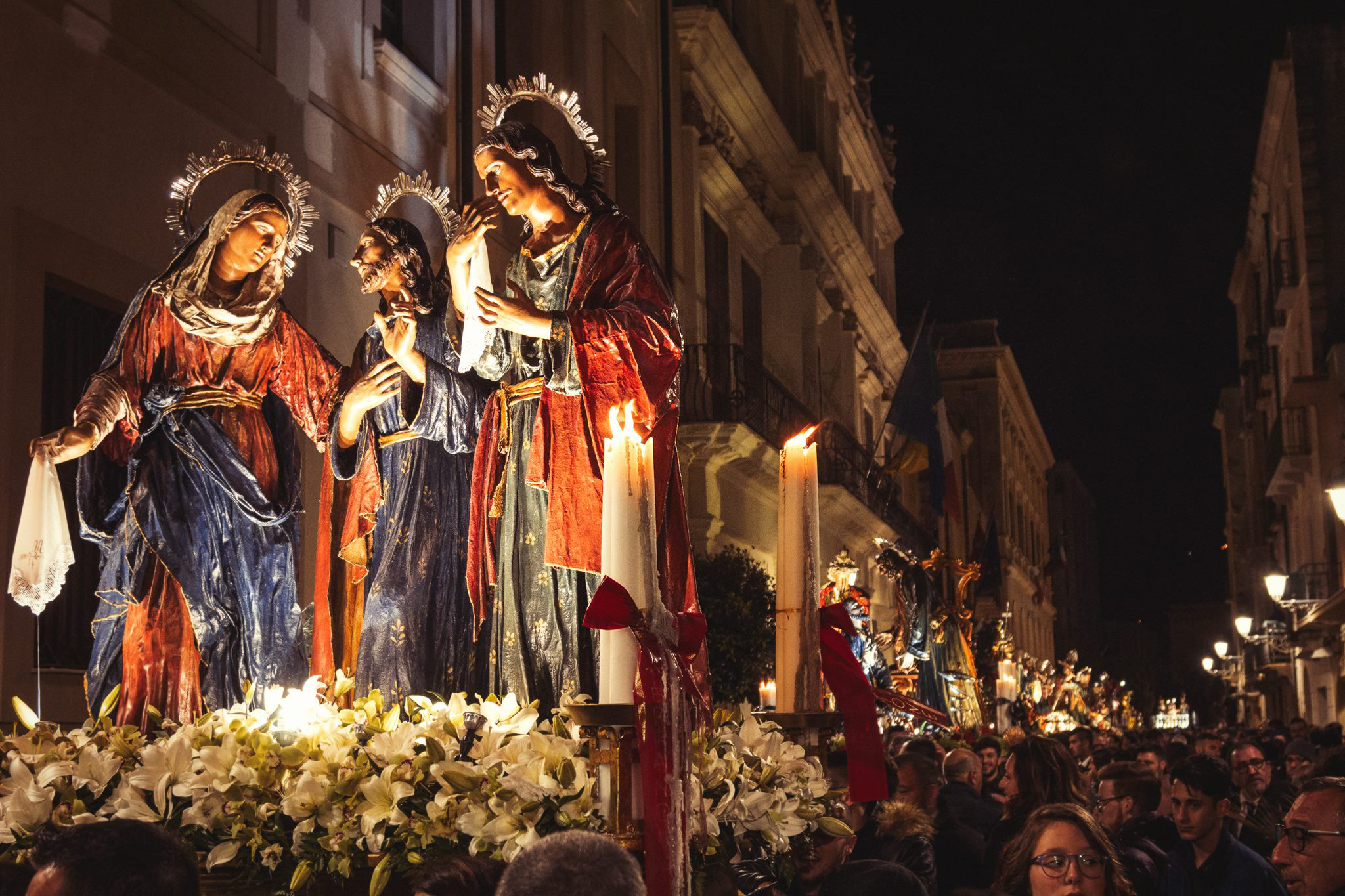
The "Misteri", the Holy Week procession in Trapani, Sicily

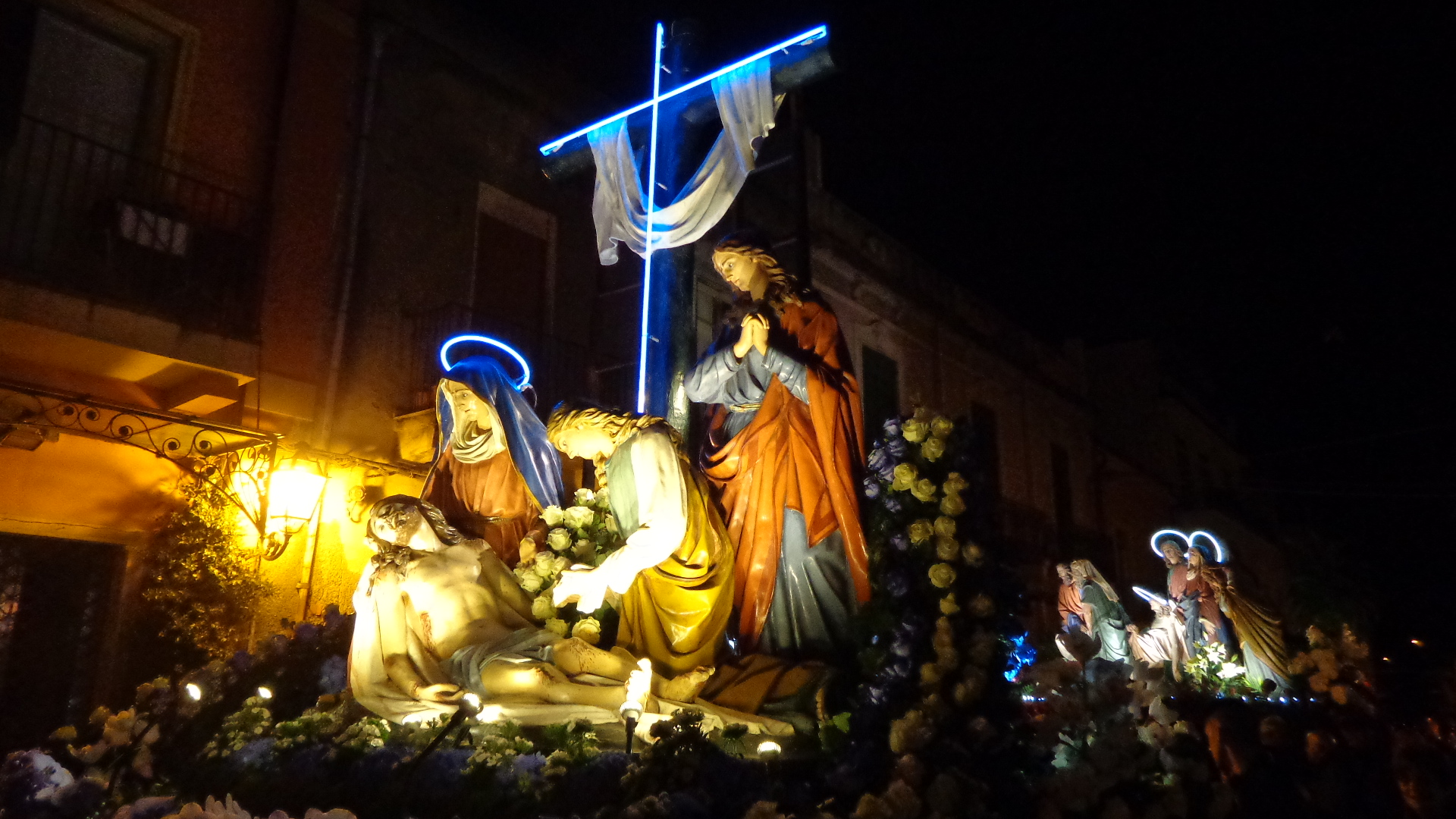
Holy Week in Barcellona Pozzo di Gotto, Sicily

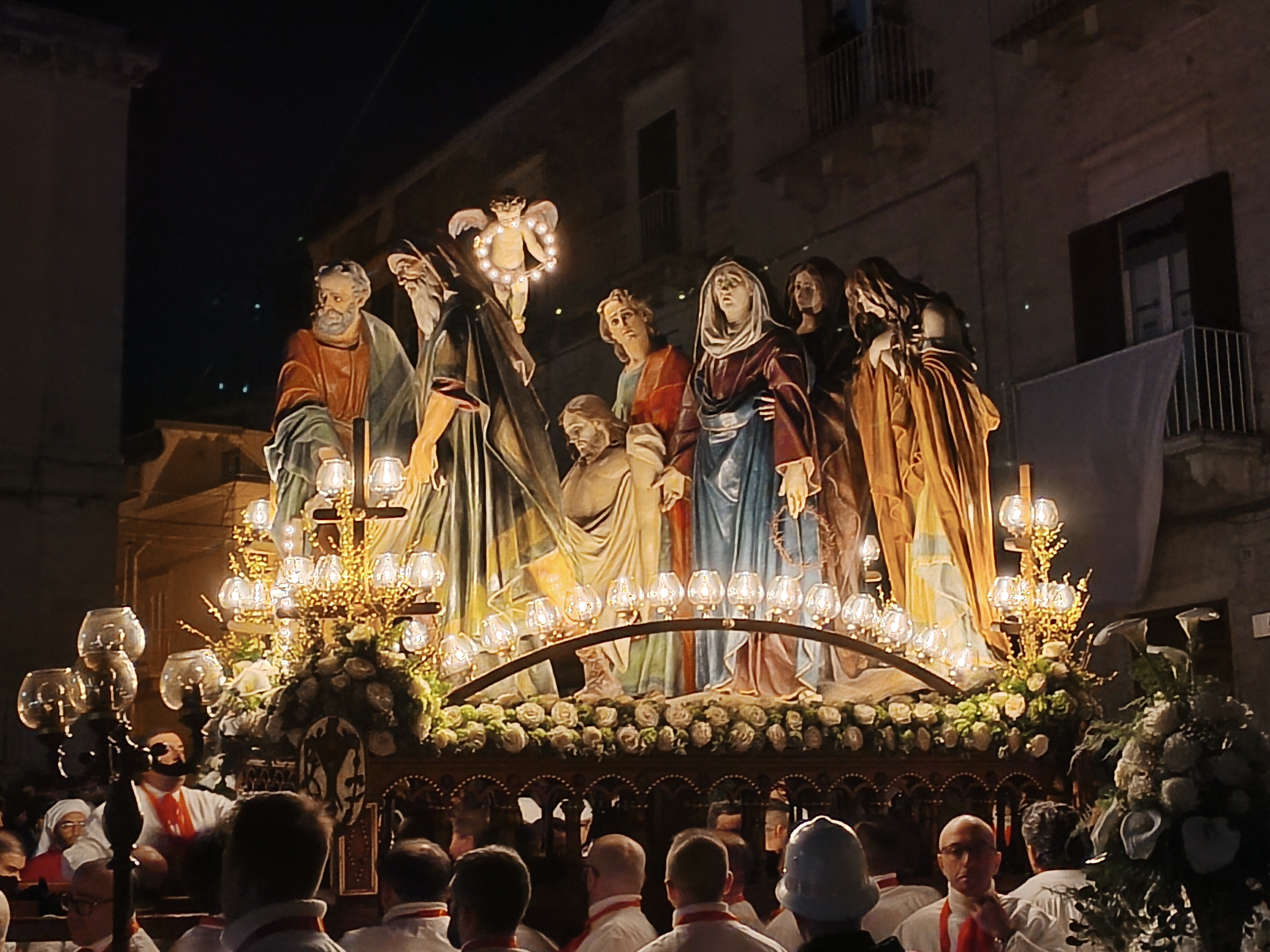
Holy Week in Ruvo di Puglia, Apulia

Holy Week is observed in parts of Southern Italy, notably Sicily. The most famous is the Holy Week of Trapani, culminating in the Processione dei Misteri di Trapani or simply the Misteri di Trapani ("Mysteries of Trapani"). This is a day-long passion procession featuring 20 floats of lifelike sculptures made of wood, canvas and glue. These sculptures are of individual scenes of the events of the Passion, a passion play at the centre and the culmination of the Holy Week in Trapani. The Misteri are amongst the oldest continuously running religious events in Europe, having been played every Good Friday since before the Easter of 1612, and running for at least 16 continuous hours, but occasionally well beyond 24 hours, are the longest religious festivals in Sicily and in Italy.

Holy Weeks worthy of note in Italy are also the Holy Week in Barcellona Pozzo di Gotto and the Holy Week in Ruvo di Puglia. The Holy Week in Barcellona Pozzo di Gotto is rooted in the history of Spanish Sicily (1516–1713) when the entire island subject to the domination of Crown of Aragon, combined with the Kingdom of Naples passes under the jurisdiction of the Crown of Spain. In 1571 "Pozzogottesi" obtained from the Grand Court of the Archbishop of Messina permission to elect their chaplain stationed in Saint Vitus no longer depend from the Archpriest of Milazzo. The first procession is carried out in 1621 as a movement of protest against the Jurors of the city of Milazzo, under whose jurisdiction Pozzo di Gotto depended politically and physically by providing a distant village and as a vow and promise to break the bond of subordination constraint which was permanently discontinued on the 22 May 1639.

The rites of the Holy Week in Ruvo di Puglia are the main event that takes place in the Apulian town. Folklore and sacred or profane traditions, typical of the ruvestine tradition, represent a great attraction for tourists from neighboring cities and the rest of Italy and Europe, and have been included by the I.D.E.A. among the events of the intangible heritage of Italy. The proof of the existence of the first Ruvestines confraternities can be found in the polyptych, a Byzantine work signed Z. T., depicting the Madonna with Child and confreres in which the inscription "Hoc opus fieri fec(e)runt, confratres san(c)ti Cleti, anno salut(i)s 1537" and preserved in the church of Purgatory, in the left aisle, the one dedicated to Saint Anacletus.

== Palm Sunday ==
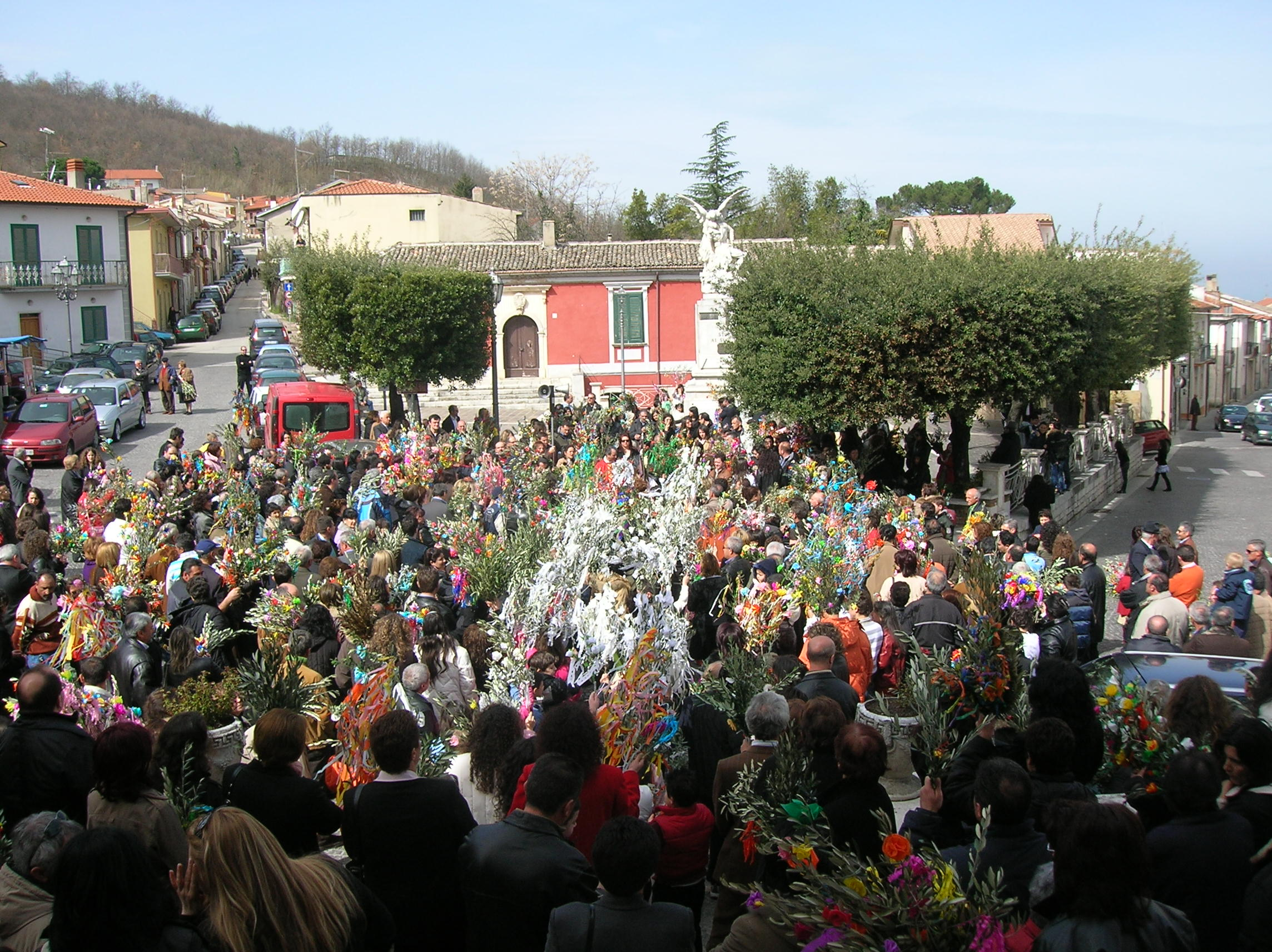
Palm Sunday in Sturno, Campania, Italy

In Italy, during Palm Sunday, palm leaves are used along with small olive branches, readily available in the Mediterranean climate. These are placed at house entrances (for instance, hanging above the door) to last until the following year's Palm Sunday. For this reason, usually palm leaves are not used whole, due to their size; instead, leaf strips are braided into smaller shapes. Small olive branches are also often used to decorate traditional Easter cakes, along with other symbols of birth, like eggs.

== Easter Monday ==
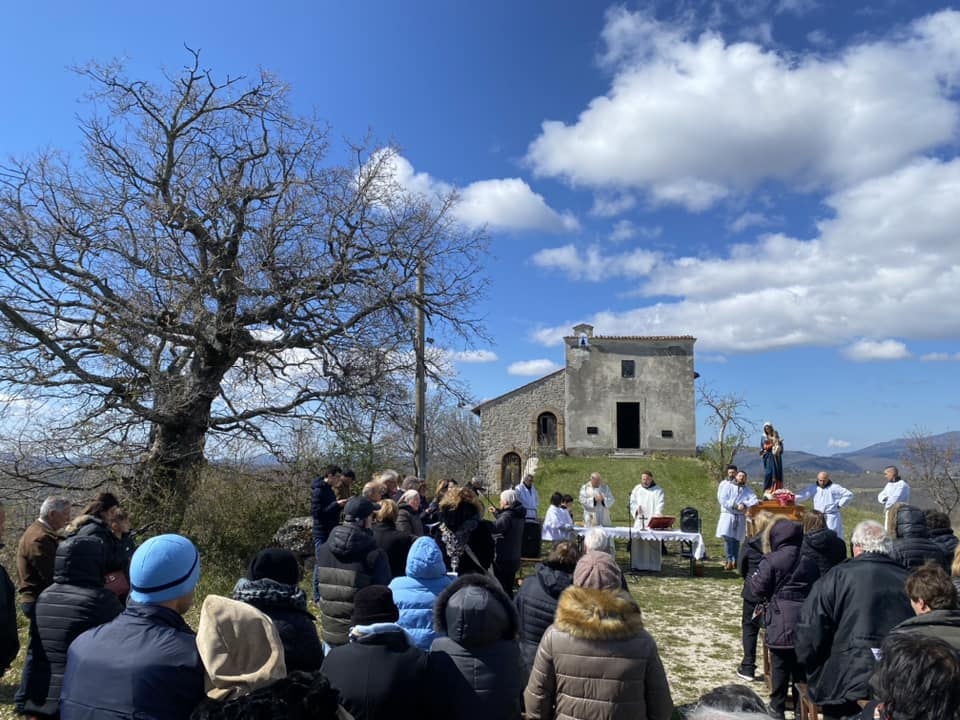
Easter Monday in Longone Sabino, Lazio, Italy

In Italy, Easter Monday is an official public holiday and is called “Lunedì dell'Angelo” (“Monday of the Angel”), “Lunedì in Albis” or more commonly “Pasquetta”. It is customary to hold a family picnic in the countryside or barbecues with friends.

== Pentecost ==
In Italy during pentecost it was customary to scatter rose petals from the ceiling of the churches to recall the miracle of the fiery tongues; hence in Sicily and elsewhere in Italy, the feast is called Pasqua rosatum. The Italian name Pasqua rossa comes from the red colours of the vestments used on Whitsunday.

== Popular traditions ==
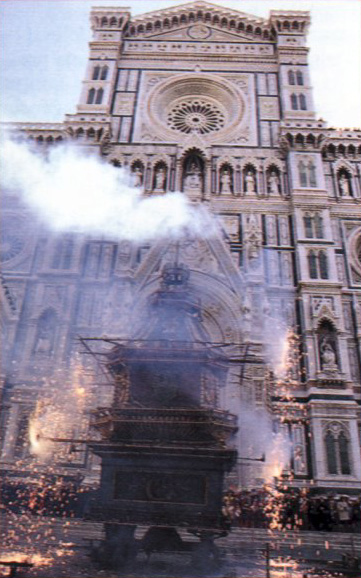
Scoppio del carro at Florence Cathedral, Tuscany, on Easter Sunday

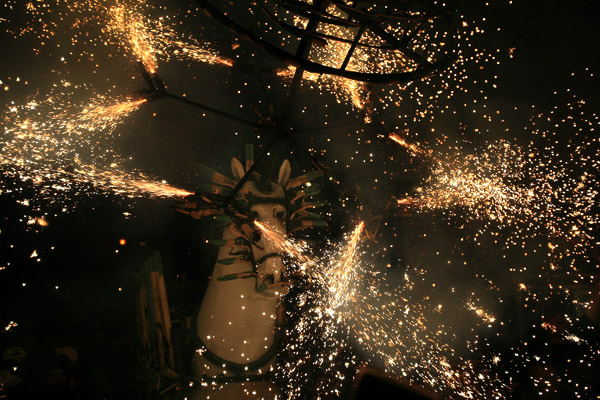
The Cavallo di fuoco in Ripatransone, Abruzzo, in action

In Italy, there are many traditions related to Easter (Italian: Pasqua). In Versilia, as a sign of forgiveness, but this time towards Jesus, the women of the sailors kiss the earth, saying: "Terra bacio e terra sono - Gesù mio, chiedo perdono" ("I kiss the earth and earth I am - my Jesus, I ask for forgiveness"). In Abruzzo, however, it is the custom of farmers during Easter to add holy water to food. Holy water is also used in Julian March, where half a glass is drunk on an empty stomach, before eating two hard-boiled eggs and a focaccia washed down with white wine.

Another symbol used during the Easter period is fire. In particular, in Coriano, in the province of Rimini, bonfires are lit on Easter Eve. At the same time, the blessed fire is brought to the countryside in the autonomous province of Bolzano. Bonfires are also lit in San Marco in Lamis, this time lit on a wheeled cart.

In Florence, the use of sacred fire has changed over time: before the year one thousand candles were in fact brought into the houses which were lit by a candle which was, in turn, lit through a lens or a flint; at the beginning of the 14th century, instead, three pieces of flint were used that according to tradition came from the Holy Sepulcher of Jerusalem. These pieces of flint were donated to the Pazzi family by Godfrey of Bouillon. Later, the use of the sacred fire in Florence materialized in a chariot full of fireworks (Scoppio del carro).

The Cavallo di fuoco is an historical reconstruction which takes place in the city of Ripatransone in the Province of Ascoli Piceno. It is a fireworks show, which traditionally occurs eight days after Easter. The show goes back to 1682 when, on the occasion of celebrations in honor of the Virgin Mary, the local dwellers hire a pyrotechnician who, once the spectacle was over, took all his remaining fireworks and shot riding his horse. This extemporized action struck the citizens who began to recall it yearly. In the 18th century a mock steed replaced the animal and the fireworks were assembled upon it. Originally it was made of wood, and until 1932 it was carried on the shoulders of the most robust of citizens. Later it was considered more convenient to equip it with wheels and a rudder and have it towed by volunteers equipped with protective clothing and accessories. In 1994 a new sheet iron horse, built on the model of the previous one, took the place of the wooden one.

== Tourism ==
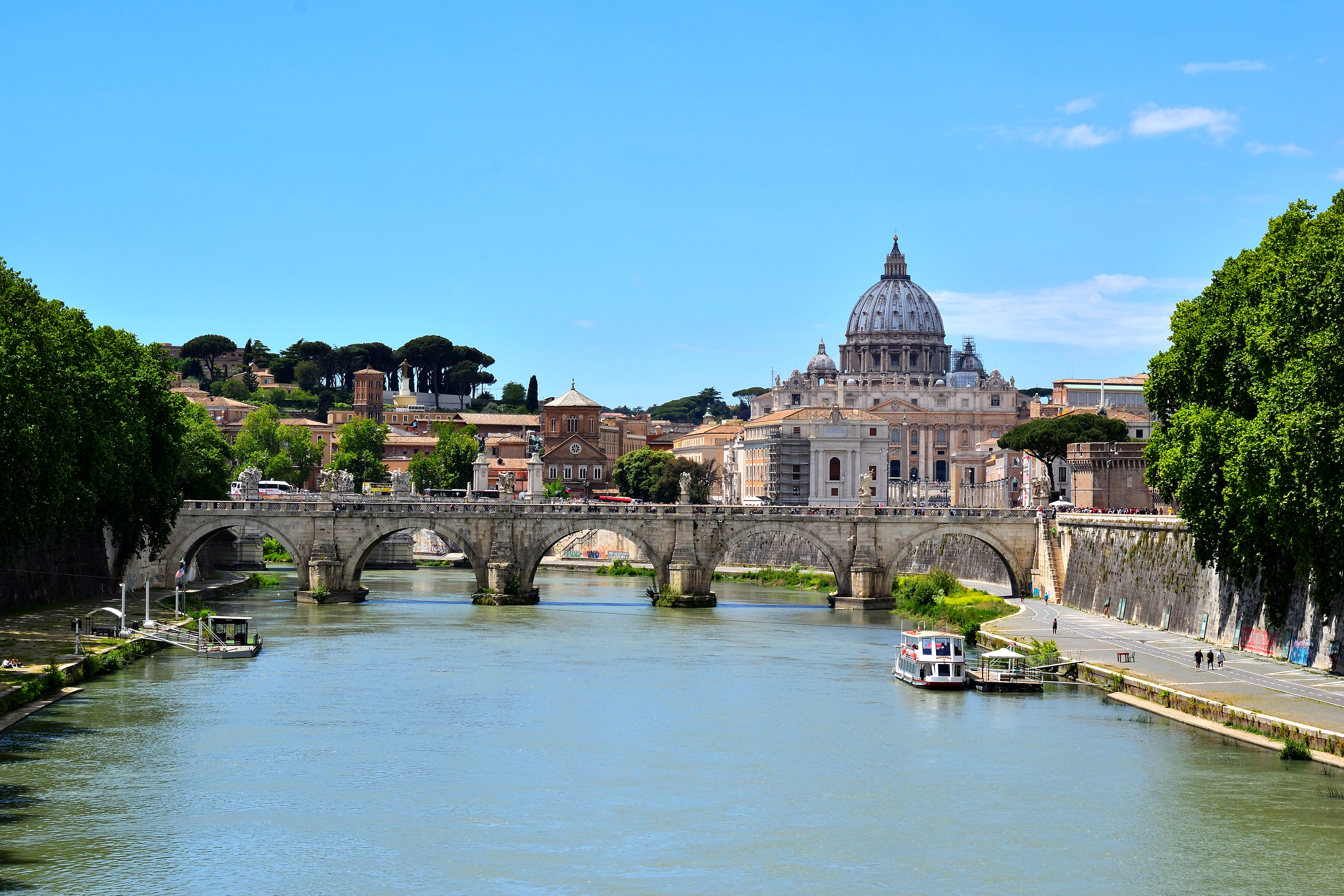
St. Peter's Basilica, viewed from the Tiber, the Vatican Hill in the back and Castel Sant'Angelo to the right, Rome (both the basilica and the hill are part of the sovereign state of Vatican City, the Holy See of the Catholic Church).

The peaks of tourist flows in Italy are recorded in winter, due to the Christmas and New Year's Day holidays, in spring, due to the Easter holidays, and in summer, due to the favourable climate.

Easter in Italy is one of the country's major holidays. Easter in Italy enters Holy Week with Palm Sunday, Maundy Thursday, Good Friday and Holy Saturday, concluding with Easter Day and Easter Monday. Each day has a special significance. Italy is one of the most visited countries in the world during the Easter holidays.

Italy is the second European country most visited by international tourists during the Easter holidays behind Spain and ahead of France and Greece. The Italian cities most visited by international tourists during the Easter holidays are, in order, Rome, Milan, Venice, Naples, Florence and Bologna.

== Gastronomy ==
=== Abbacchio ===
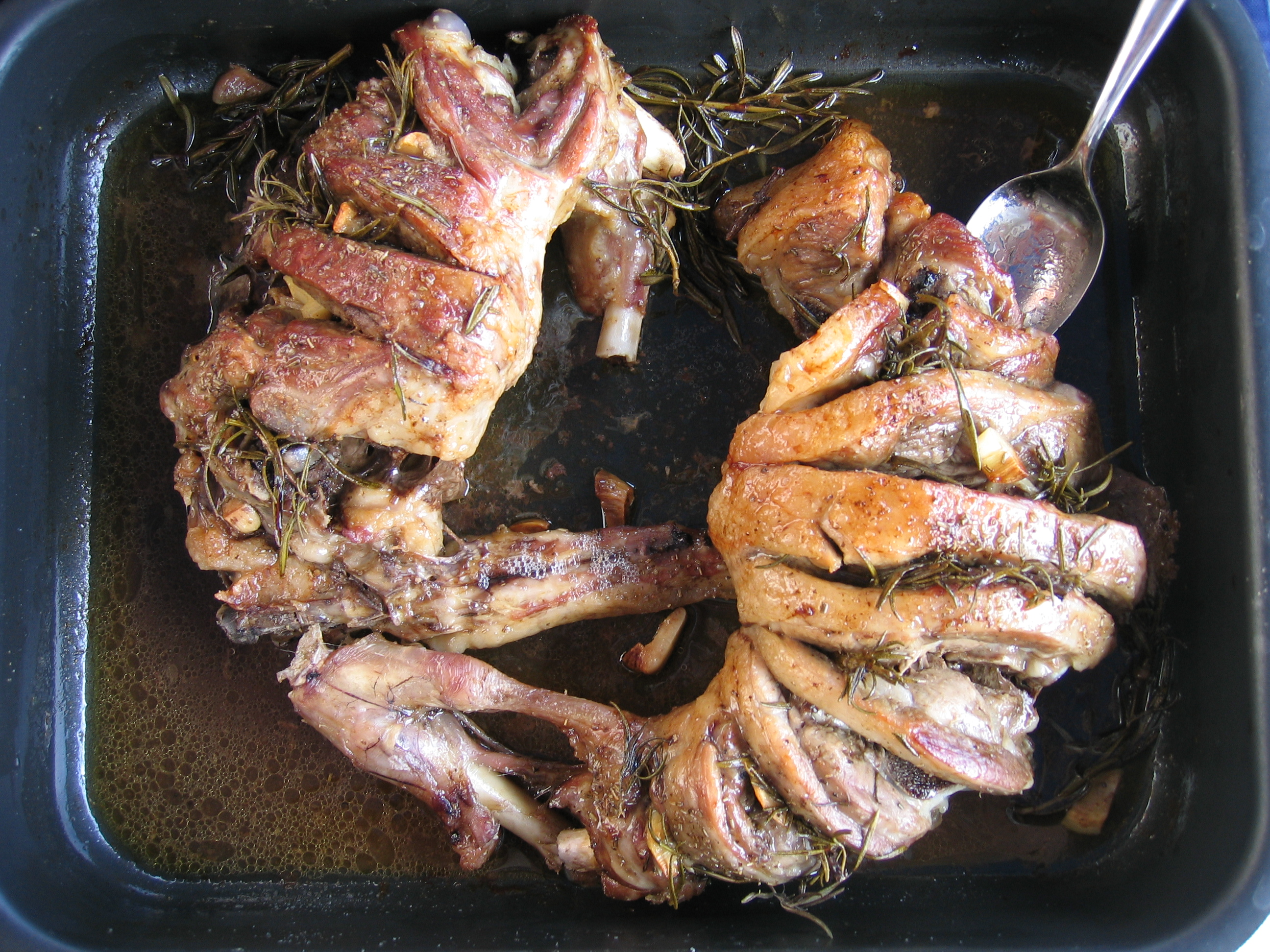
Abbacchio, an Italian preparation of lamb

Abbacchio is an Italian preparation of lamb typical of the Roman cuisine. It is a product protected by the European Union with the PGI mark. In Romanesco dialect, the offspring of the sheep who is still suckling or recently weaned is called abbacchio, while the offspring of the sheep almost a year old who has already been shorn twice is called agnello ("lamb"). This distinction exists only in the Romanesco dialect.

In Italy at Easter, abbacchio is cooked in different ways, with recipes that vary from region to region. In Rome it is roasted, in Apulia in the oven, in Naples it is cooked with peas and eggs, in Sardinia it is cooked in the oven with potatoes, artichokes and myrtle and in Tuscany it is cooked in cacciatore style. Other local preparations include frying and stewing.

Eating lamb at Easter has a symbolic meaning. The Paschal Lamb of the New Testament is in fact, for Christianity, the son of God Jesus Christ. The Paschal Lamb, in particular, represents the sacrifice of Jesus Christ for the sins of humanity. Eating lamb at Easter therefore commemorates the Death and Resurrection of Jesus.

=== Cappello del prete ===
Cappello del prete (sometimes called tricorno) is a variety of Italian salume typical of Parma and Piacenza. It is recognized as a prodotto agroalimentare tradizionale. The cappello del prete is a product of ancient origin. Its preparation was already widespread in the 16th century tradition of butchery, when in Emilia it was prepared to be consumed during the Easter holidays or during Carnival. The name of the cappello del prete ("priest's hat") derives not only from the fact that this is the name of the cut of the shoulder meat used, but also from the particular triangular shape with a camber in the central part that vaguely recalls the three-point hats used in the past by priests.

=== Casatiello ===
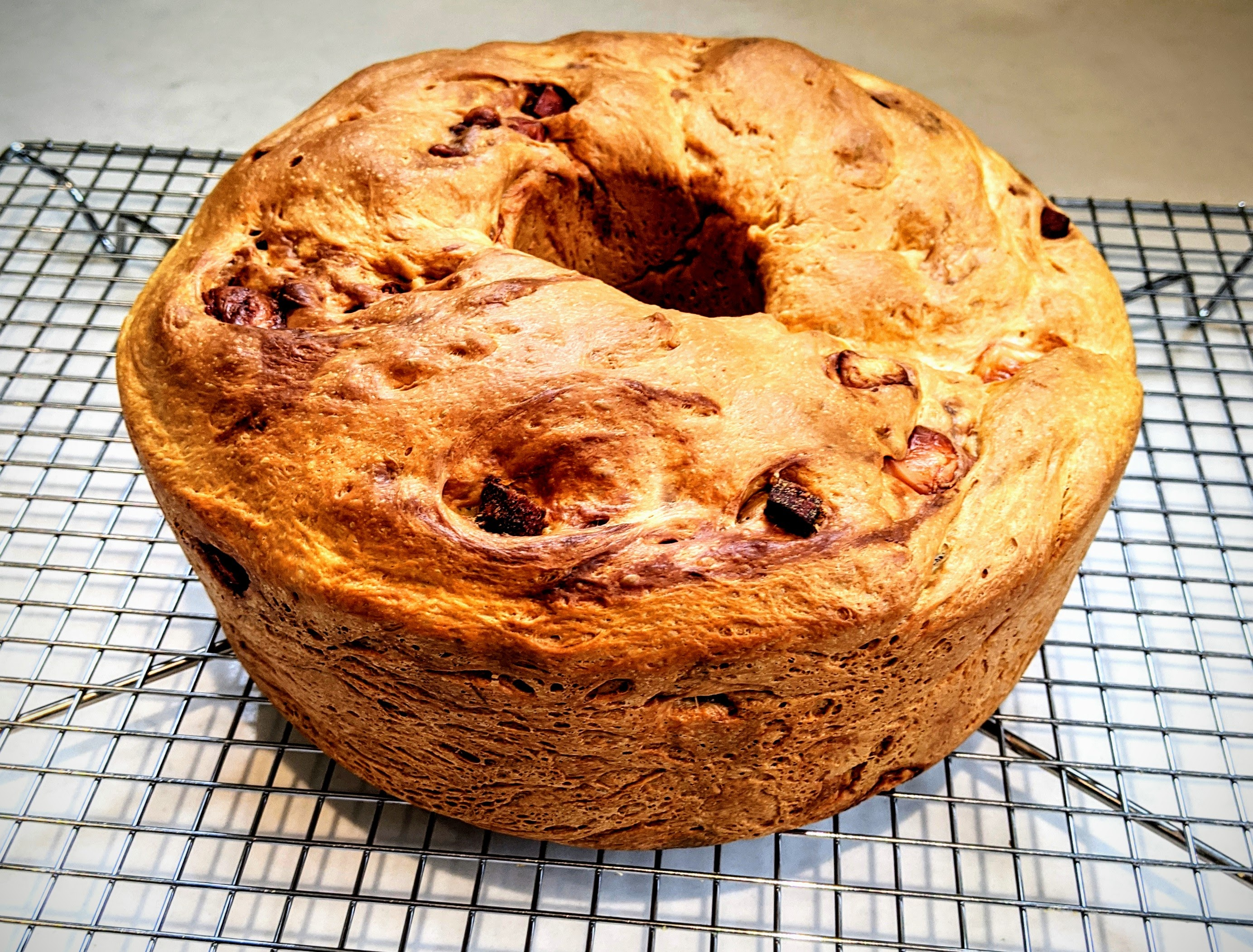
Casatiello

Casatiello (Neapolitan: casatiéllo, Italian: casatello) is a leavened savory bread originating from Naples prepared during the Easter period. Its basic ingredients are flour, lard, cheese, salami, cracklings, eggs and black pepper. The bread's name derives probably from the Neapolitan word caso (Italian: cacio, "cheese", hence casatiello), an ingredient that is part of its dough.

=== Colomba di Pasqua ===
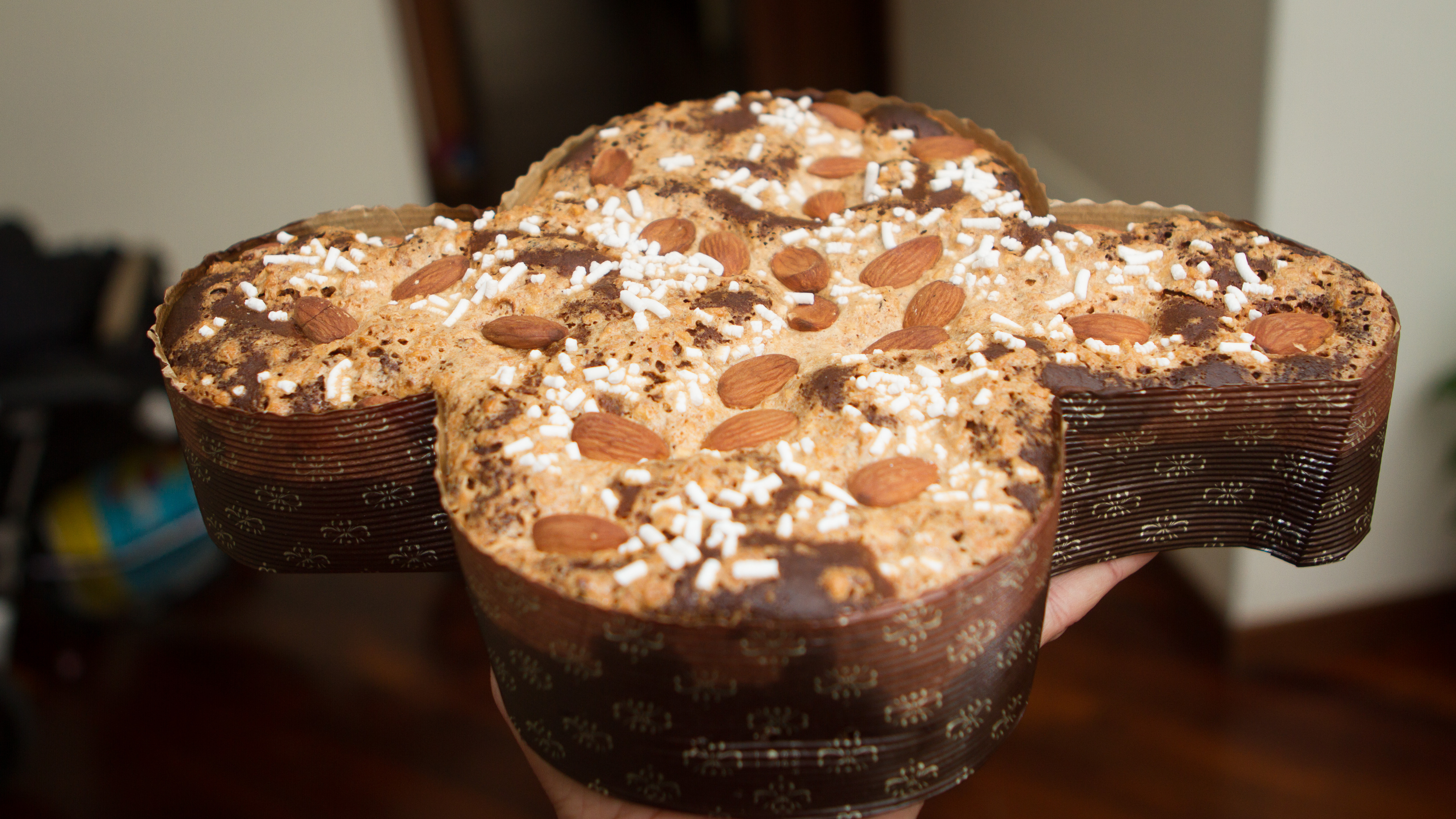
Colomba di Pasqua

Colomba pasquale or colomba di Pasqua (English: "Easter Dove") is an Italian traditional Easter bread, the counterpart of the two well-known Italian Christmas desserts, panettone and pandoro. The dough for the colomba is made in a similar manner to panettone, with flour, eggs, sugar, natural yeast and butter; unlike panettone, it usually contains candied peel and no raisins. The dough is then fashioned into a dove shape (colomba in Italian) and finally is topped with pearl sugar and almonds before being baked. Some manufacturers produce other versions including a popular bread topped with chocolate. The colomba was commercialised by the Milanese baker and businessman Angelo Motta as an Easter version of the Christmas speciality panettone that Motta foods were producing.

=== Pastiera ===
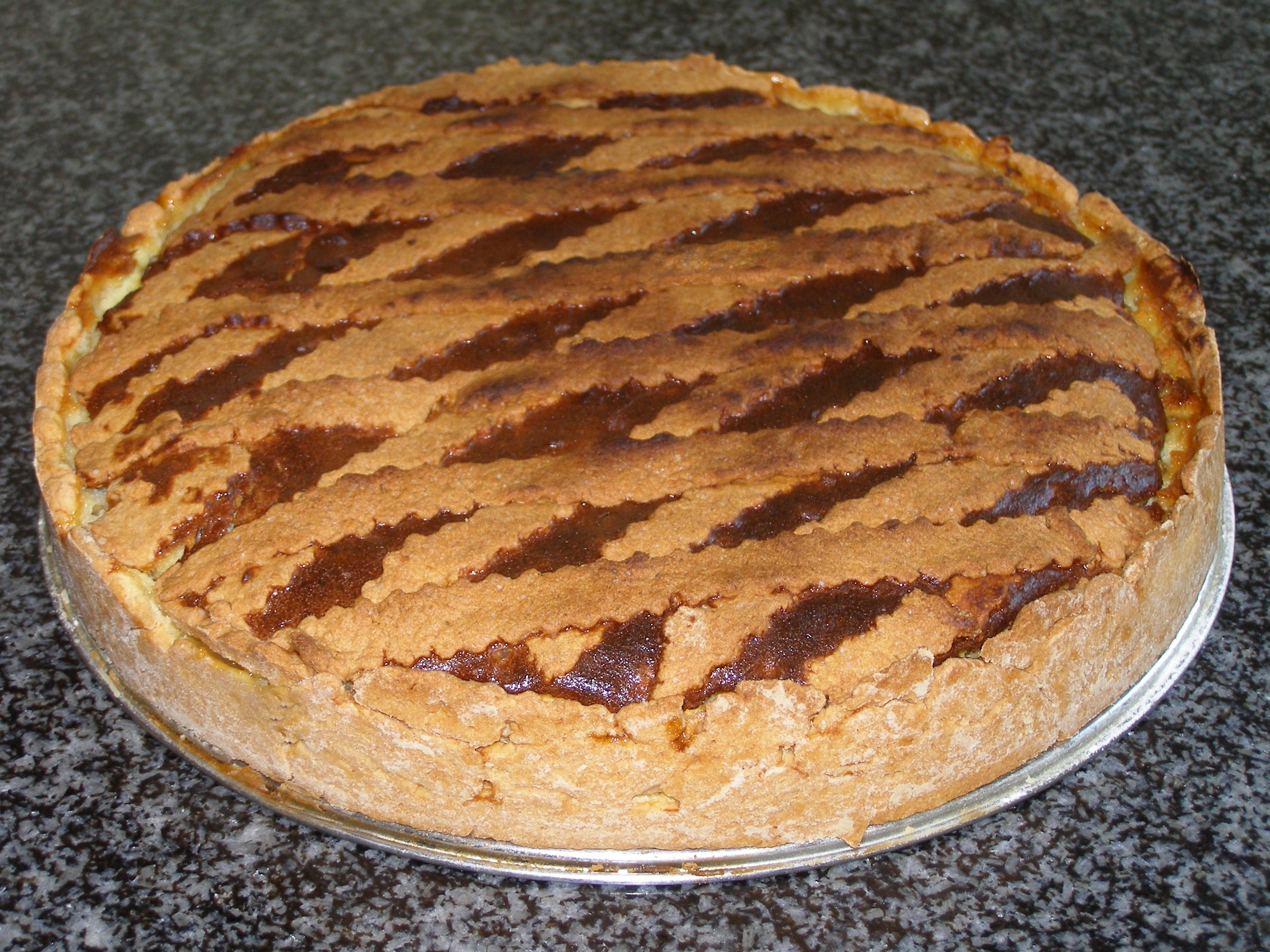
Pastiera

Pastiera is a type of Neapolitan tart made with cooked wheat, eggs, ricotta, and flavored with orange flower water. It is usually eaten at Easter. Various writers repeat legends about the origin of pastiera. One story connects it to the siren Parthenope, whom the Neapolitans thanked for her sweet singing by giving her ricotta, flour, eggs, milk, spices, and sugar; Parthenope gave these ingredients to the gods, who made pastiera out of it. Another story connects it to a spring celebration of the goddess Ceres.

=== Penia ===
Penia is a sweet bread that originated in rural Italy and is made during the Easter holiday. Ingredients include sugar, butter, eggs, anise seeds and lemons.

=== Pizza di Pasqua ===
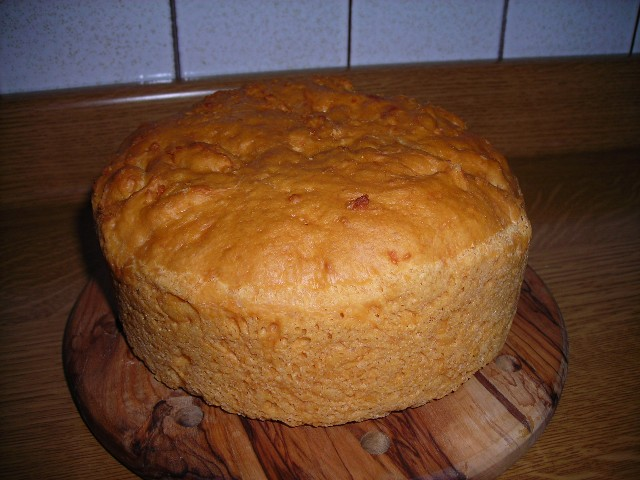
Pizza di Pasqua

The pizza di Pasqua ("Easter pizza" in English), in some areas also called crescia di Pasqua, torta di Pasqua, torta al formaggio or crescia brusca, is a leavened savory cake typical of many areas of central Italy based on wheat flour, eggs, pecorino and parmesan. Traditionally served at breakfast on Easter morning, or as an appetizer during Easter lunch, it is accompanied by blessed boiled eggs, ciauscolo and red wine or, again, served at the Easter Monday picnic. Having the same shape as panettone, the pizza di Pasqua with cheese is a typical product of the Marche region, but also Umbrian (where, as a traditional food product, it obtained the P.A.T. recognition). There is also a sweet variant. The peculiarity of this product is its shape, given by the particular mold in which it is leavened and then baked in the oven; originally in earthenware, today in aluminum, it has a flared shape. The name pizza is here to be understood not in the recent meaning that has spread into Italian through the Neapolitan language, but in the original medieval Latin meaning of 'focaccia', thus suggesting an ancient origin of the dish.

=== Pizzelle ===
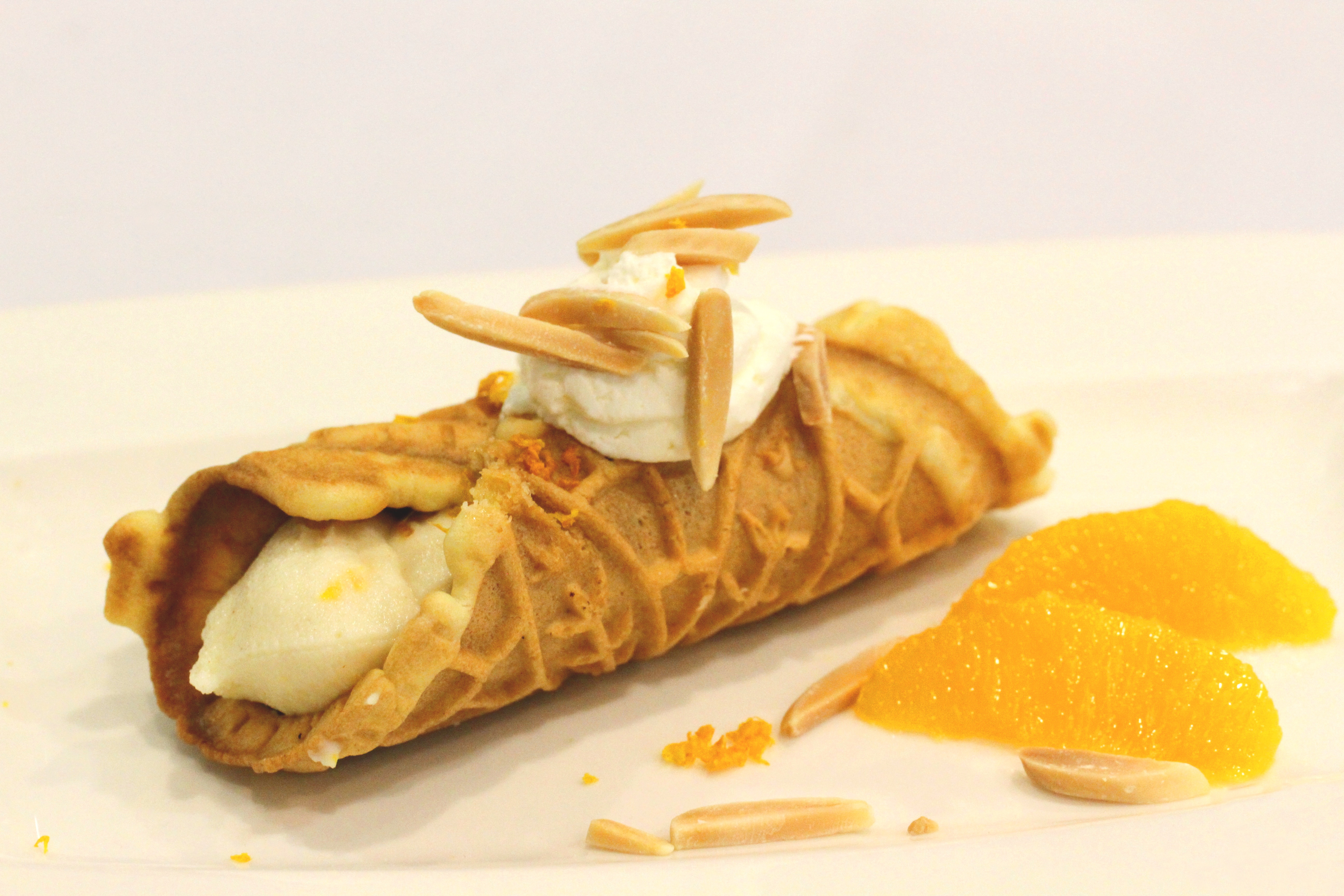
Pizzelle shaped into a cannoli and filled with an orange-almond creme

Pizzelle (sg.: pizzella) are traditional Italian waffle cookies made from flour, eggs, sugar, butter or vegetable oil, and flavoring (usually anise or anisette, less commonly vanilla or lemon zest). Pizzelle can be hard and crisp or soft and chewy depending on the ingredients and method of preparation. It can be molded into various shapes, including in the tubular shape of cannoli.

Pizzelle were originally made in Ortona, in the Abruzzo region of Southern Italy. Many other cultures have developed a pizzelle-type cookie as part of their culture (for example, the Norwegian Krumkake). It is known to be one of the oldest cookies and is likely to have developed from the ancient Roman crustulum.

Pizzelle are also known as ferratelle or nevole in some parts of Abruzzo. Pizzelle are known as ferratelle in the Lazio region of Italy. In Molise they may be called ferratelle, cancelle, or pizzelle. Pizzelle are popular during Christmas and Easter. They are often found at Italian weddings, alongside other traditional pastries such as cannoli and traditional Italian cookies. It is also common to sandwich two pizzelle with cannoli cream (ricotta blended with sugar) or hazelnut spread. Pizzelle, while still warm, can also be rolled into a tubular shape using a wooden dowel to create "cannoli" shells.

== See also ==
- Holy Week in Barcellona Pozzo di Gotto
- Holy Week in Ruvo di Puglia
- Scoppio del carro
- Cavallo di fuoco
- Public holidays in Italy
- Christmas in Italy
