= Penia (bread) =

Type of sweet Italian bread

- Type: Sweet bread
- Place of origin: Italy
- Main ingredients: Sugar, butter, eggs, anise seeds, lemons

Penia is a sweet bread from rural Italy that is prepared during the Easter holidays. Ingredients include sugar, butter, eggs, anise seeds, and lemons.

== See also ==
Anise Bread (Penia) at the Wikibooks Cookbook subproject
