= Cappello del prete =

Variety of Italian salume

- Place of origin: Italy
- Region or state: Emilia-Romagna
- Main ingredients: Pork
- Ingredients generally used: Salt, whole-grain pepper

Cappello del prete, sometimes called tricorno, is a salume typical of Parma and Piacenza. It is recognized as a prodotto agroalimentare tradizionale (PAT).

== Etymology ==
The name of the cappello del prete (lit. 'priest's hat') derives not only from the fact that this is the name of the cut of the shoulder meat used, but also from the particular triangular shape with a camber in the central part that vaguely recalls the three-point hats used in the past by priests.

== History ==
Cappello del prete is a product of ancient origin. Its preparation was already widespread in the 16th century tradition of butchery, when in Emilia-Romagna it was prepared to be consumed during the Easter holidays or during Carnival.

== Preparation ==
The meat used for the preparation of the cappello del prete is that of the pork shoulder. This is first deboned, then the muscles of the shoulder are removed from the rind which is carefully preserved to act as an external coating.

The meat thus obtained is then salted and spiced with peppercorns and aromatic herbs and inserted into the rind.

Finally we proceed to insert the sewn priest, inside two wooden boards tightened very tightly along the longitudinal axis of the cappello del prete.

It is normally left to dry and mature for a minimum of two weeks to a maximum of two months (depending on the climate), before cooking and eating.

== Use ==
Cappello del prete is consumed only after cooking which takes place through a slow boiling of at least four hours. Once cooked, the priest's hat is cut into medium-thick slices and served hot accompanied with mashed potatoes or lentils. Before cooking it is a good idea to leave it for about ten hours in cold water without salt to make the rind soft.
