= Cavallo di fuoco =

Annual event in Italy

The Cavallo di fuoco (Italian for 'Fiery Horse'; pronounced [kaˈvallo di ˈfwɔːko]) is an Italian historical reconstruction which takes place in the city of Ripatransone in the Province of Ascoli Piceno. It is a singular fireworks show, which traditionally occurs eight days after Easter.

== History ==
The show goes back to 1682 when, on the occasion of celebrations in honor of the Virgin Mary, the local dwellers hired a pyrotechnician who, once the spectacle was over, took all his remaining fireworks and shot riding his horse. This extemporized action struck the citizens who began to recall it yearly. In the 18th century a mock steed replaced the animal and the fireworks were assembled upon it.

== Celebration ==
The Octave of Easter begins with the Mass in the cathedral of Ripatransone, it goes on with the parade of the brotherhoods and it ends with the pyrotechnical show. Around 9.00 pm the mock horse appears in the streets of the town preceded by the marching band and followed by a group of passionate people provided with cowbells and whistles. A huge crowd waits for them in the Matteotti and Condivi squares. After the Horse reached his stage, it runs a pace lap after which the street lighting is turned off. The steed, stuffed with squibs of any kind, runs several laps shooting them on air and among people. The most stunning fireworks have mass denominations such as Baffi (whiskers) which shoot aside and Girella (pinwheel) which constitutes the most important moment of the show. Although sometimes the spectacle can generate panic (especially in not accustomed viewer) and many people are used to be inebriated by the typical red wine of the place, accidents have never happened.
