= Scoppio del carro =

Easter folk tradition of Florence

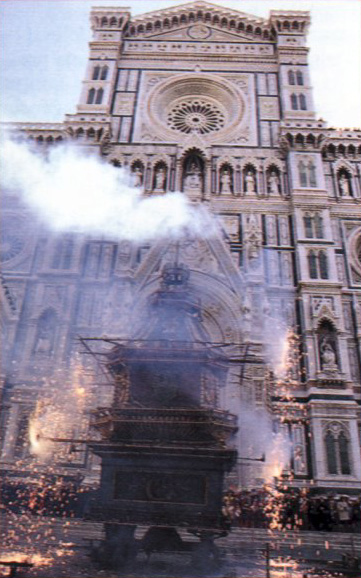
The cart explosion outside the Duomo di Firenze

The Scoppio del Carro ("Explosion of the Cart") is a folk tradition of Florence, Italy. On Easter Sunday, a cart, packed full of fireworks and other pyrotechnics, is lit and provides a historic spectacle in the civic life of the city.

== History ==
The event of the Scoppio del Carro has its origins in the First Crusade, when Europeans laid siege to the city of Jerusalem in a conflict to defend and preserve Christian practice, freedom, tradition, and lands. In 1097, Pazzino de' Pazzi, a Florentine from a prominent family, was by tradition the first man to scale the walls of Jerusalem. As a reward for this act of bravery, his commander gave him three flints from the Church of the Holy Sepulchre, which were then carried back to Tuscany. These are kept in the Church of Santi Apostoli.

It became the practice for a "holy fire" to be struck from these flints at Eastertide, which was then carried throughout the city by groups of young men bearing torches. In time, this tradition evolved to something similar to what is seen today; a cart bearing a large candle was rolled through the city to the cathedral, from where the holy fire would be distributed.

By the end of the 15th century, the Scoppio del Carro assumed its present form.

Since the event involves a display of great noise and light to ensure a good harvest, farmers from the Florentine countryside still observe the Scoppio del Carro with interest for this traditional reason.

== The event ==
On the morning of Easter Sunday, a 30‑foot‑tall (9.1 m) antique fireworks cart, used in a tradition that has existed in Florence for over 500 years, is drawn from the Porta al Prato to the Piazza del Duomo. Hauled by white oxen adorned with garlands of the first flowers and herbs of spring, the cart is escorted by led by soldiers, musicians, and others in historical dress.

Meanwhile, a fire is struck using the historic flints from Jerusalem at Chiesa dei Santi Apostoli. It is then carried in procession to the cathedral square by members of the Pazzi family, clerics, and city officials.

The cart is loaded with fireworks while a wire, stretching to the high altar inside the cathedral, is fitted with a mechanical dove (the "colombina"). Shortly thereafter, at the singing of the Gloria in excelsis Deo during Easter Mass, the cardinal of Florence lights a fuse in the colombina with the Easter fire. It then speeds through the church to ignite the cart outside.

During all of these stages, the bells of Giotto's campanile ring out.

The complex fireworks show that follows lasts about 20 minutes. A successful display from the "Explosion of the Cart" is supposed to guarantee a good harvest, stable civic life, and good business.

== See also ==
- Duomo di Firenze
- Easter customs
