= Misteri di Trapani =

Religious procession in Trapani, Sicily

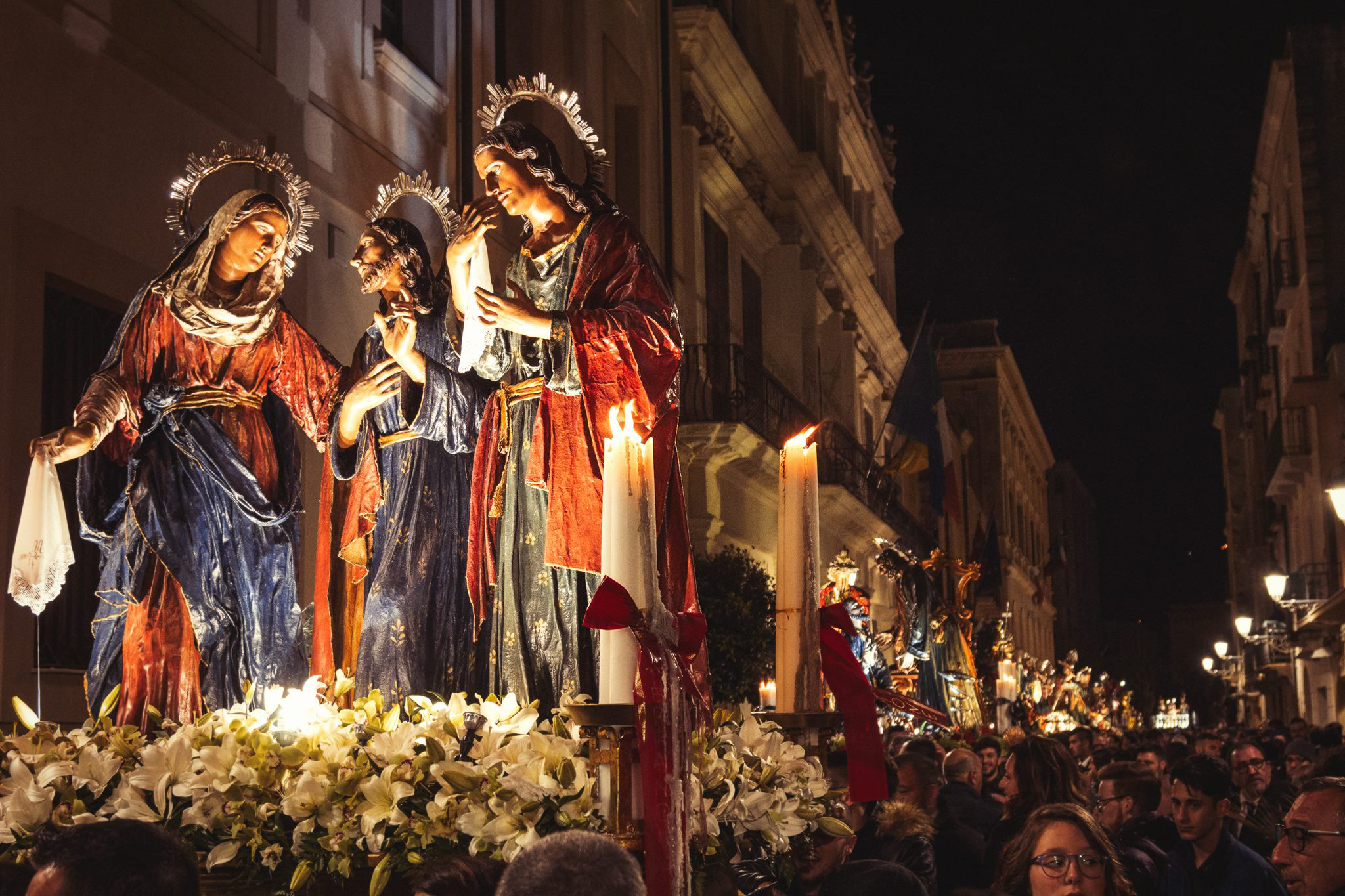
Group of the Misteri

The Processione dei Misteri di Trapani or simply the Misteri di Trapani (in English the Procession of the Mysteries of Trapani or the Mysteries of Trapani) is a day-long passion procession featuring twenty floats of lifelike sculptures made of wood, canvas and glue. These sculptures are of individual scenes of the events of the Passion, a passion play at the centre and the culmination of the Holy Week in Trapani. The Misteri are amongst the oldest continuously running religious events in Europe, having been played every Good Friday since before the Easter of 1612, and running for at least 16 continuous hours, but occasionally well beyond the 24 hours, are the longest religious festival in Sicily and in Italy.

A short video of The Easter Procession.

== History ==
In the late Middle Ages and early renaissance the phenomenon of the Passion plays had spread in most Catholic countries. Passion plays, also when springing from a sincere religious devotion, were anyway occasionally mutating in farces, a trend which became more widespread in the early 16th century, to the obvious discomfiture of the Catholic hierarchies, who then started to oppose them.

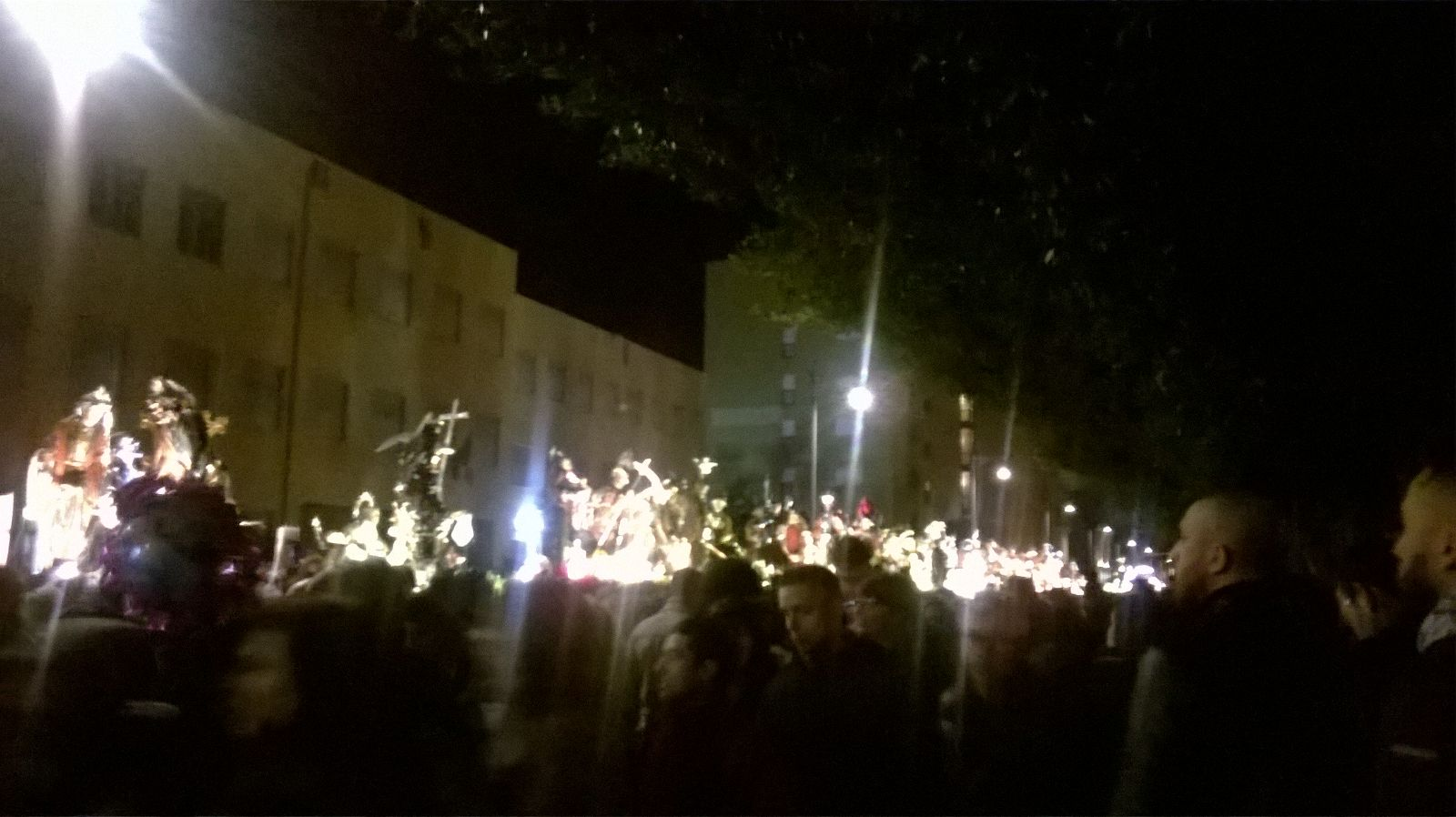
The Procession in the night

In the late 16th century, religious authorities but also lay authorities ended up to forbid or anyway to strongly limit passion plays in various place around Europe, meanwhile in certain areas, like in parts of the then sprawling Spanish Empire, these started to be substituted by Semana Santa processions of figurative art depicting the various episodes of the Passion of Jesus.

Just like the procession of the pasos in Seville, or the procession of the vare in Caltanissetta or in many similar processions in various parts of the contemporary Spanish Empire, in Trapani at some point during the Counter-Reformation the episodes of the passion of Jesus started to be narrated through sculptural groups who were created from local artists.

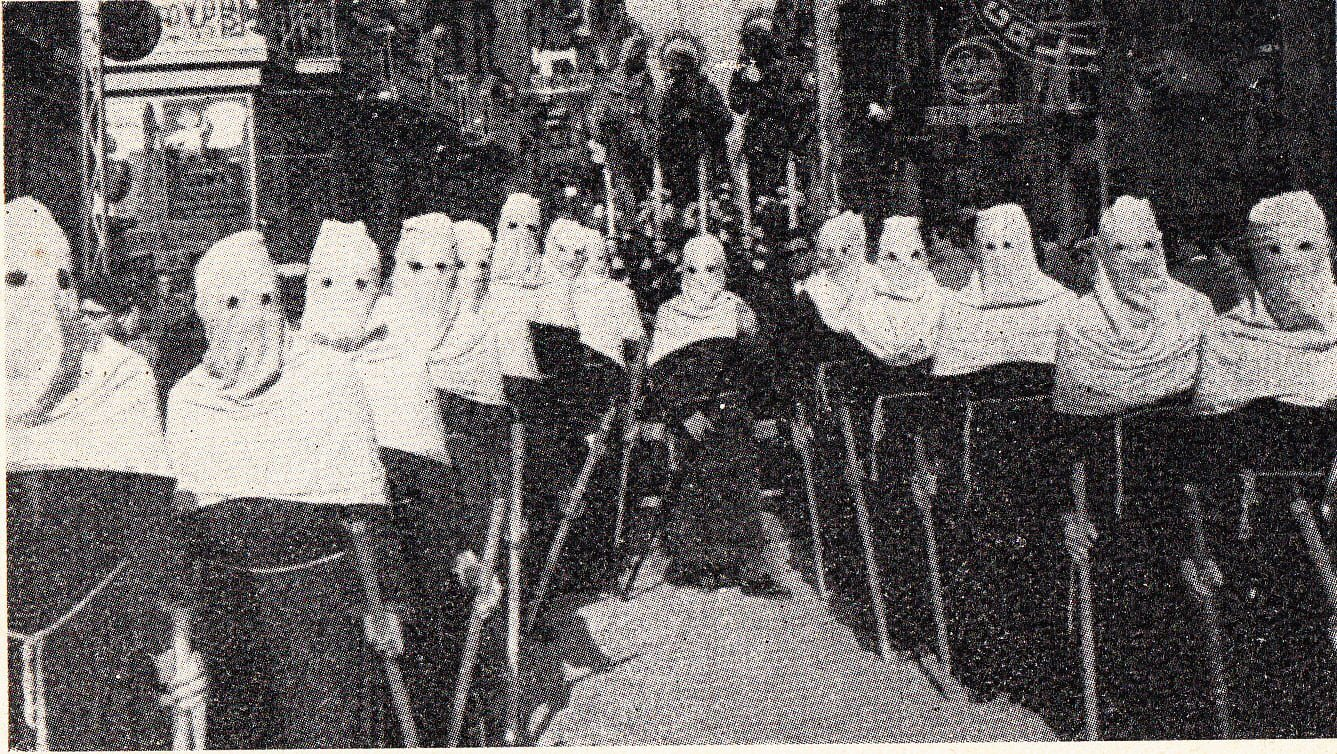
Picture of the procession from the early 1900s

As the most famous contemporary historian of the story of the city of Trapani, Francesco Pugnatore, does not mention the existence of the Misteri in its magnum opus, the much detailed 'Historia di Trapani' published in 1594, we can reasonably presume that the procession of the Misteri was not held before at least the latter part of the 16th century. As the Fellowship of the Precious Blood of Christ and of the Mysteries (in Latin Societas Pretiosissimi Sanguinis Christi et Misteriorum), one of the two religious societies which were managing the procession of the Misteri in the early to middle 17th century, was founded by in 1603, and the procession is explicitly referred on a document notarized 20 April 1612, the deed of trust on which the Guild of the Journeymen was granted the caretaking of the group representing the Ascent to Calvary, we can also reasonably assume that the procession of the Misteri was surely held before the Easter of 1612.

== The sculptures ==
The 'Misteri' are an artistic representation of the Passion and Death of Jesus through twenty sculptural groups, including two statues of the Dead Jesus and of the Lady of Sorrows. They were granted in trust, by deeds, by the Brotherhood of St. Michael the Archangel, which instituted the rite in the late 16th century, to the members of the local Guilds in exchange of the promise to carry them during the passion procession every Good Friday.

== List of the 20 groups and of the related guilds ==
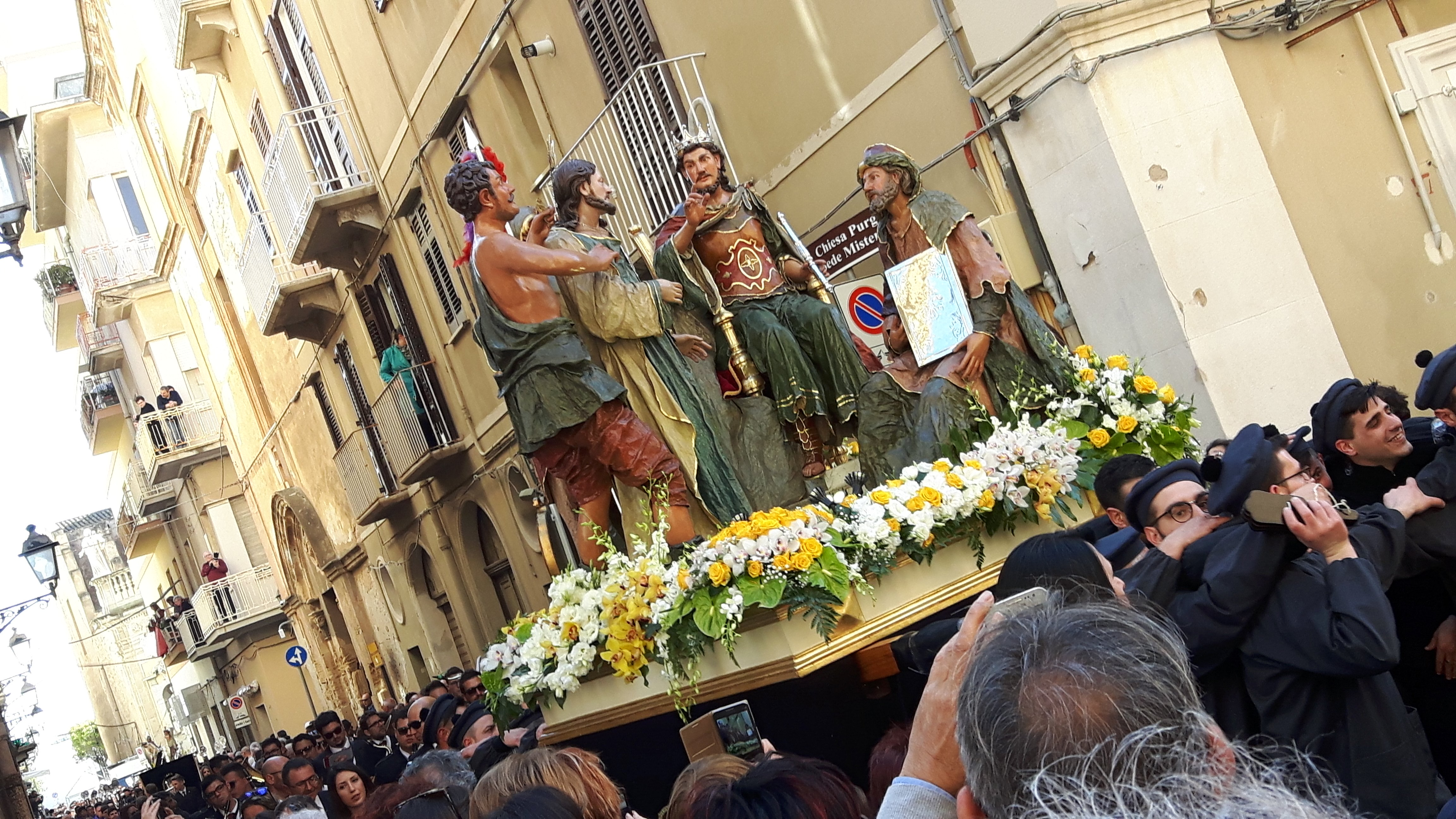
The Arrest of Jesus statue

1. The Separation (or The License or The Departure) by the guild of the Goldsmiths
2. The Washing of the Feet by the guild of the Fishermen
3. Jesus in the Garden of Gethsemane by the guild of the Farmers
4. The Arrest by the guild of Metalworkers
5. Jesus falls into the Cedron Brook by the guild of the Sailors
6. Jesus before Hanna by the guild of the Grocers
7. The Denial by the guilds of the Barbers and of the Hairdressers
8. Jesus before Herod by the guild of the Fishmongers
9. The Flagellation by the guilds of the Bricklayers and of the Stonemasons
10. The Crowning with Thorns by the guild of the Bakers
11. Ecce Homo! by the guild of the Shoemakers
12. The Judgement by the guild of the Butchers
13. The Ascent to Calvary by the People, the citizens and denizens of Trapani
14. The Disrobing by the guilds of the Drapers and of the Cloth Merchants
15. The Elevation of the Cross by the guild of the Carpenters
16. The Wound to the Chest by the guilds of the Painters and of the Decorators
17. Descent from the Cross by the guilds of the Tailors and of the Upholsterers
18. the Transport to the Sepulchre by the guild of Saltpan Workers
19. The Sepulchre by the guild of Pasta Makers
20. The Sorrows by the guilds of the Waiters, of the Drivers, of the Hotel Workers, of the Confectioners and of the Bartenders.
