= Holy Week in Barcellona Pozzo di Gotto =

The rites of Santa Sumana are a popular religious event typical of the Italian town of Barcellona Pozzo di Gotto.

== Origins ==
The rites of Sumana Santa or Santa Sumana are rooted in the Semana Santa celebrations imported into Spanish Sicily during the period 1516 to 1713 when the entire island subject to the domination of Crown of Aragon, combined with the Kingdom of Naples passes under the jurisdiction of the Crown of Spain. In 1571 "Pozzogottesi" obtained from the Grand Court of the Archbishop of Messina permission to elect their chaplain stationed in Saint Vitus no longer depend from the Archpriest of Milazzo. The first procession is carried out in 1621 as a movement of protest against the Jurors of the city of Milazzo, under whose jurisdiction Pozzo di Gotto depended politically and physically by providing a distant village and as a vow and promise to break the bond of subordination constraint which will be permanently discontinued on the 22 of May 1639. Initially it is carried in procession the Catafalco with the Dead Christ, after 5 will be the statues that depict respectively Mysteries: the Agony in the Garden of Gethsemane, the Lord to the column, the Fall, the Lord's Cross, the Urn. Then will be added the statue of Our and gradually, other scenes representing the Stations of the Cross until you reach the current number. A first suspension of the Sacred Representation occurs following a seismic event, known as the southern Calabria Earthquake of 1783, after which the statuary groups suffered significant damage. The interruption is prolonged until 1800, and in 1801 a similar procession is organized in the core of Barcellona. The village to the west of Longano in turn under the jurisdiction of Castroreale and had already followed the example of the neighboring community rebelling against Jurors castrensian doing in the Church recognize their independence. The autonomy of the village of Barcellona is decided by the Sicilian Parliament, recognized by the King 15 May 1815 and ratified in Vienna on February 28, 1823, by King Ferdinand I of the Two Sicilies. The administrative union decreed January 5, 1835 comes into force on the 1 st. June 1836 at the behest of King Ferdinand II of the Two Sicilies, deciding that the new municipality formed by the merger of the two ancient districts bore the full name of Barcellona Pozzo di Gotto. Since Barcellona Pozzo di Gotto has two Archpriests and boasts the occasion of Holy Friday two separate processions, parades and routes.

== Events ==
- Holy Wednesday: Rite of Ecce Homo and meeting of the Visillanti Barcelona and Pozzo di Gotto, at the Church of Jesus and Mary in Pozzo di Gotto.
- Holy Thursday: in all the churches Mass in Cena Domini with the rite of washing of the feet, procession of the Apostles and a visit to the Altars of Repose improperly called Tomb. See Altar of Repose.
- Holy Friday: in all the parishes Passion of the Lord, ligation of the Bells replaced by traccole, stripping of the altars. In Pozzo di Gotto: dressing of the Jews. Procession of Vare followed by the singing of Visillanti Visilla ("Vexilla Regis prodeunt ....") of Venantius Fortunatus and meeting on the bridge at the eventide Longano.
- Holy Saturday: in every parish: Easter Vigil.
- Monday: at the Church of Jesus and Mary, in Pozzo di Gotto: Solemn Mass and Replacement Teca in Ecce Homo.
- Low Sunday: at the Parish of the Oreto Procession for the meeting between the Risen Christ with Mary.

== The Vare ==
In similar events is still in use Cataletto or Catafalco with Dead Christ, often veiled in the colors of mourning. In the representations of the Holy Week rites of Barcellona Pozzo di Gotto, in both the processions Catafalco is replaced with urns or coffins of wood and glass, from which the etymology "Bara" and "Baretta." The terms "vara", "Varetta" and "varare" are derived from Latin and Spanish that means to lead, carry with rods or shafts, promoting sustainable through the use of stands. The transport and the stops along the processional route followed the trend of the times: the long poles for carrying on the shoulder carried by porters and trestles were replaced with more comfortable wagons, which have kept only the rods for directing or entrainment of simulacra.

=== Type ===
Sequence and name of the Vare	Barcellona	Pozzo di Gotto
The Last Supper	Â Cena 1801 (coopers, distiller)	Â Cena (carpenters, joiners)
Prayer in the Olives Garden or Gethsemane	Û Signuri all'Ortu (carpenters and porters)	Û Signuri all'Ortu (peasants associationsand Catholics)
The Praetorium of Pilate	Û Pritoriu di Pilatu	
The Flagellation	Û Signuri â Colonna (blacksmiths)	Û Signuri â Colonna
The Ecce Homo	L'Accia Omu (Confraternity of the Immaculate)	L'Accia Omu 1621 (Brotherhood of Sant'Eusenzio)
The Christ with the Cross	Û Signuri câ Cruci (potters)	Û Signuri câ Cruci
The encounter with the Holy Women	Û Signuri 'ncontra Marta, Maria e Maddalena (recreational facilities)	
The Fall	Û Signuri â cascata 1800 (tailors and shopkeepers)	Û Signuri â cascata 1911
The dispossession of the garments		Û Signuri spugghiatu dî Giudei
The Crucifixion	Û Crucifissu (Brotherhood of the HolyCross, carpenters)	Û Crucifissu 1870 (Confraternity of the Blessed Sacrament)
The Descent from the Cross	Â Scesa o Deposizzioni dâ Cruci (construction contractors)	
The Pietà	Â Pietà (fishmongers)	Â Pietà
The Deposition in the Sepulchre	Û Signuri puttatu ntô Sapuccru (butchers)	
The Symbols of the Passion		I Simbuli dâ Passioni
Urn with Dead Christ and the Jews	Û Signuri Mottu (S.S. Brotherhood of John the Baptist)	Û Signuri Mottu 1895
The Sorrows	Â 'Ddulurata (S.S. Brotherhood of John the Baptist)	Â 'Ddulurata (Brotherhood of the Souls in Purgatory)

== Gallery ==
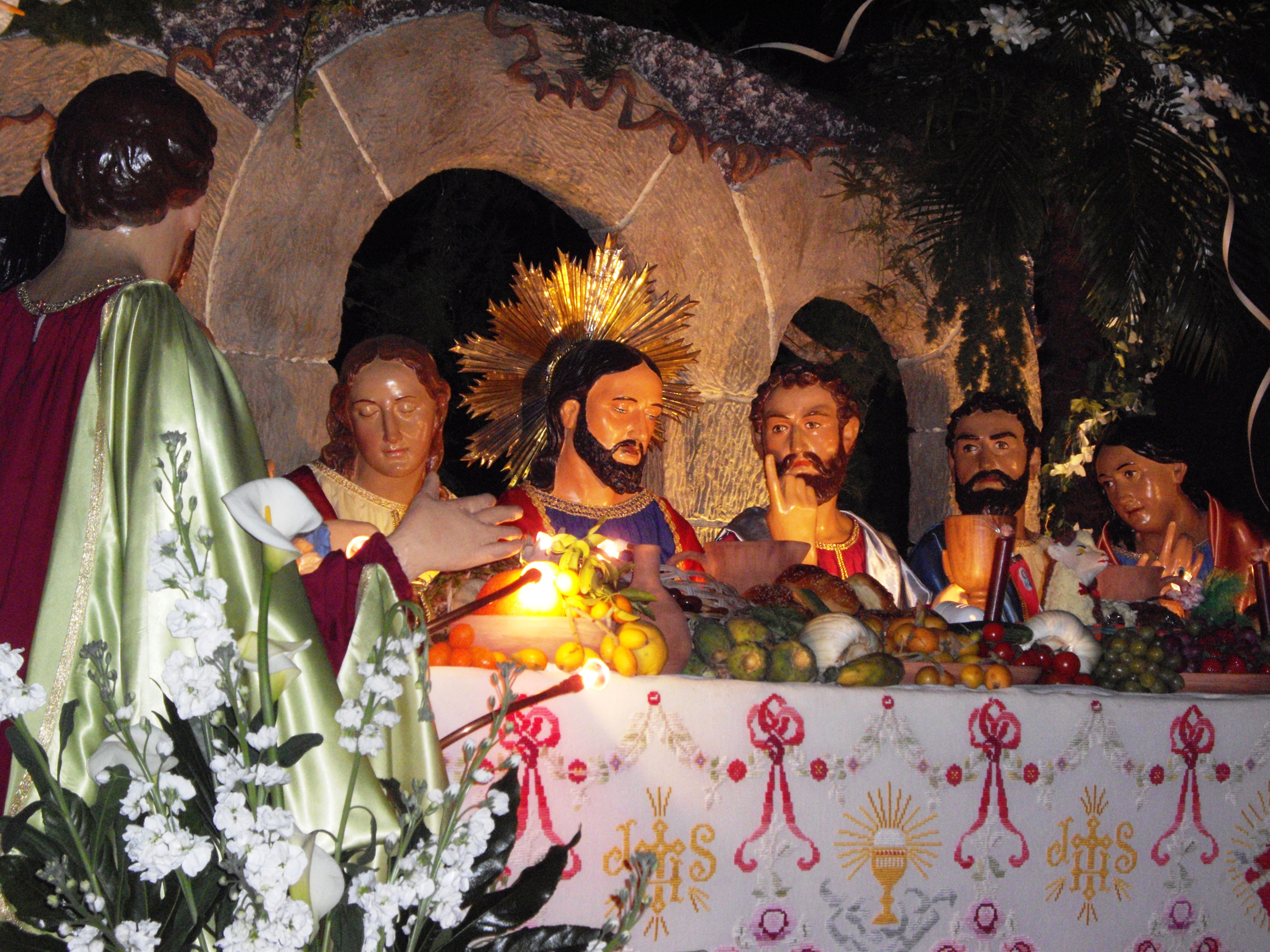

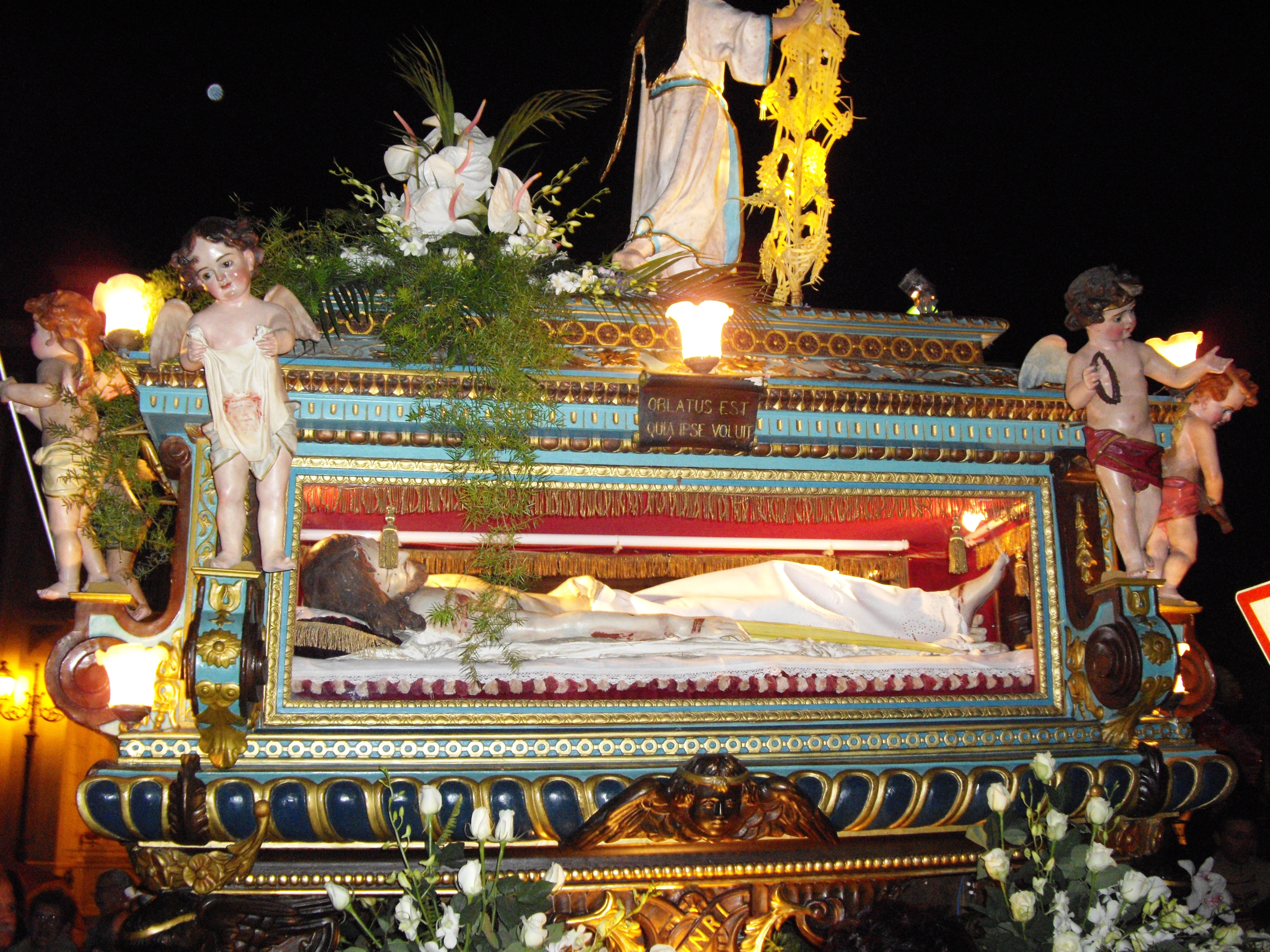

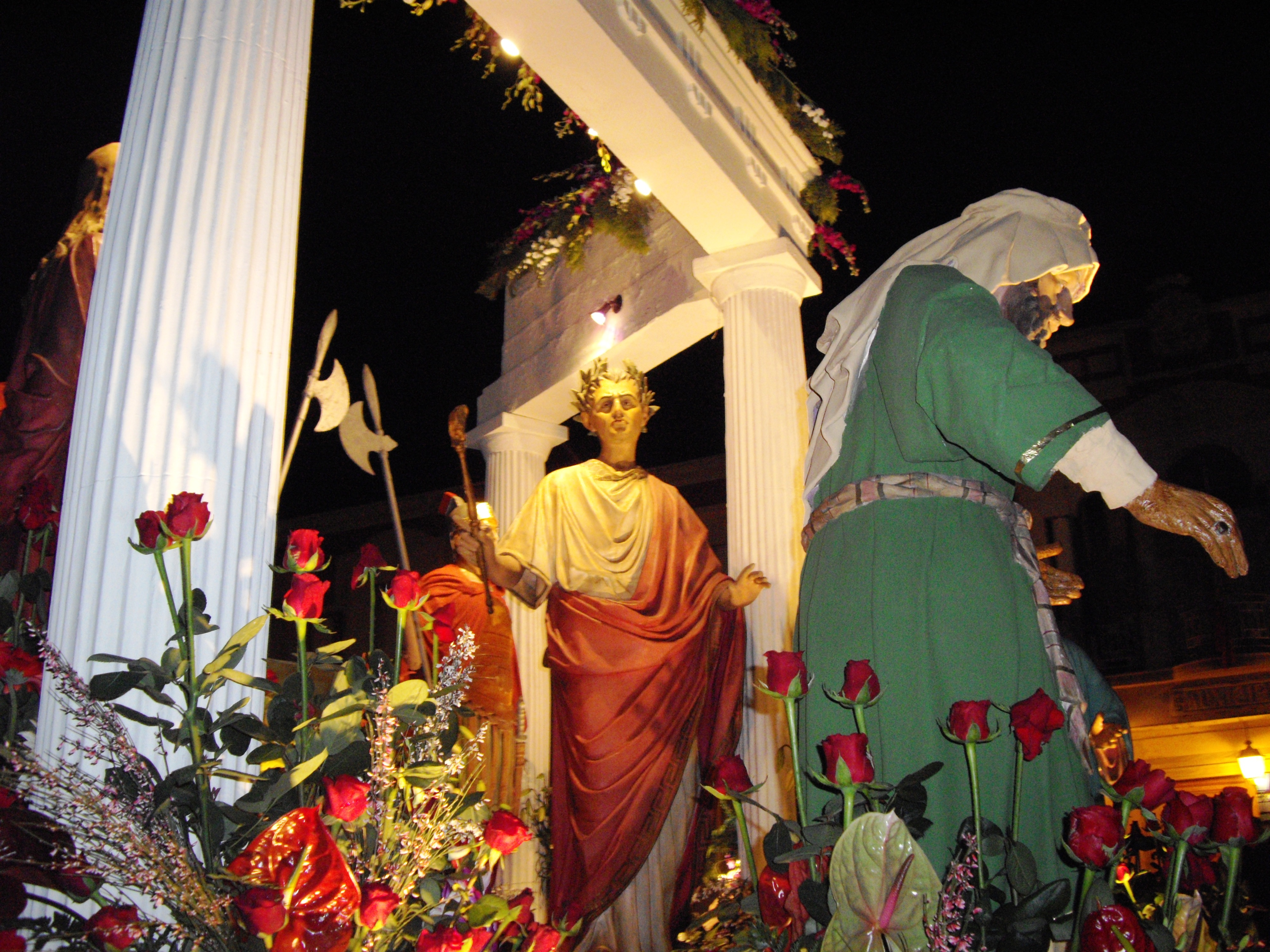

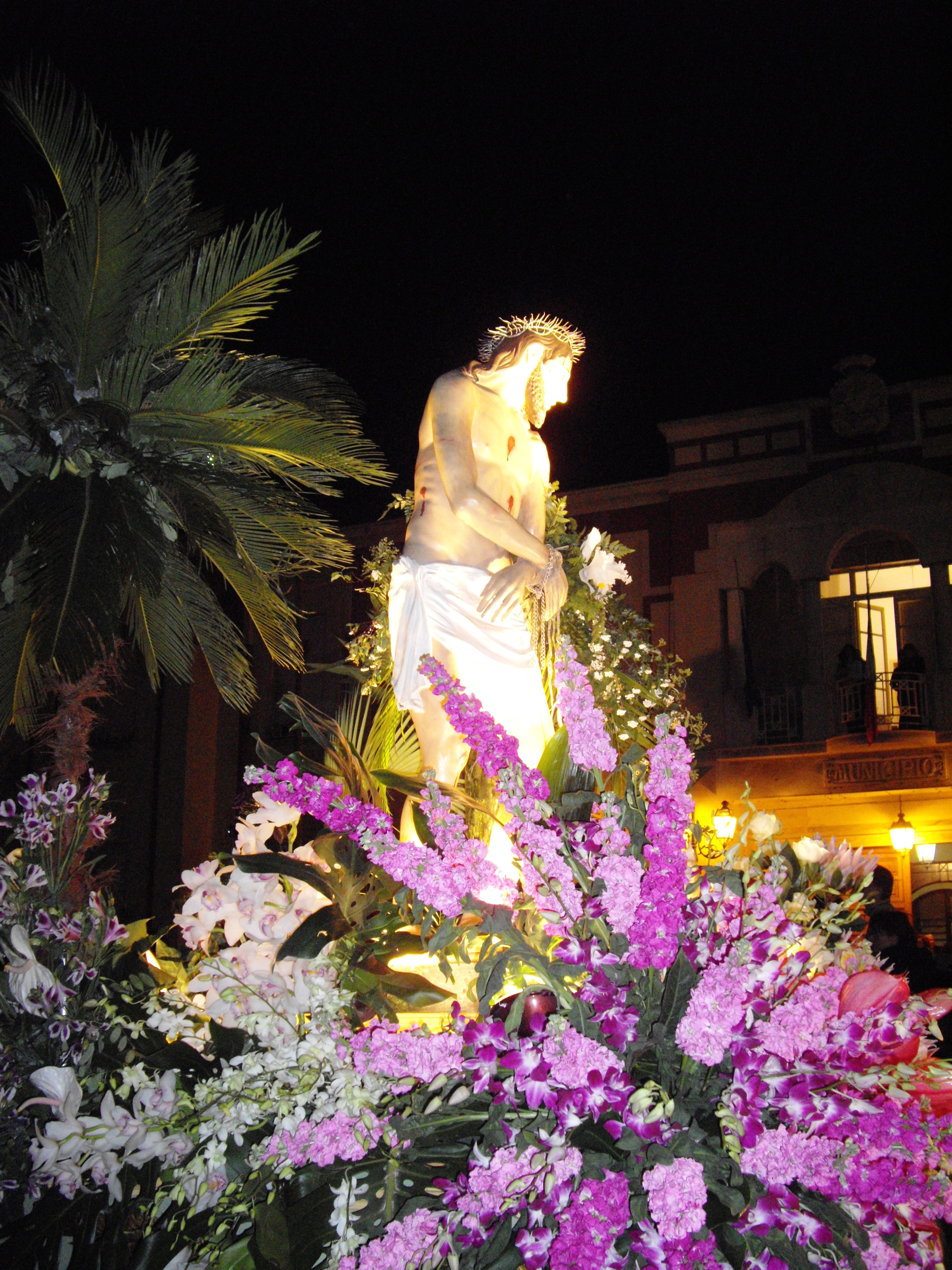

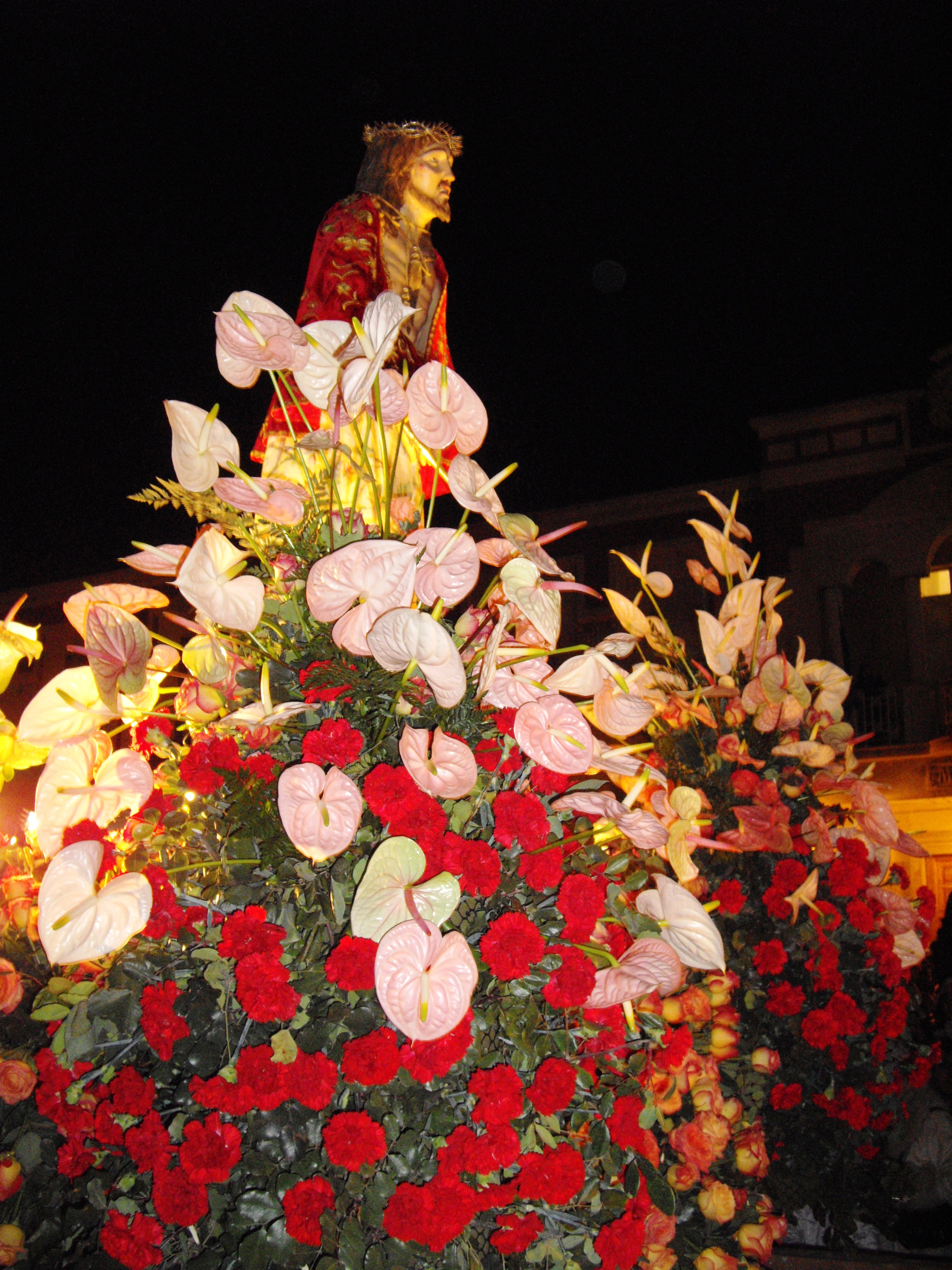

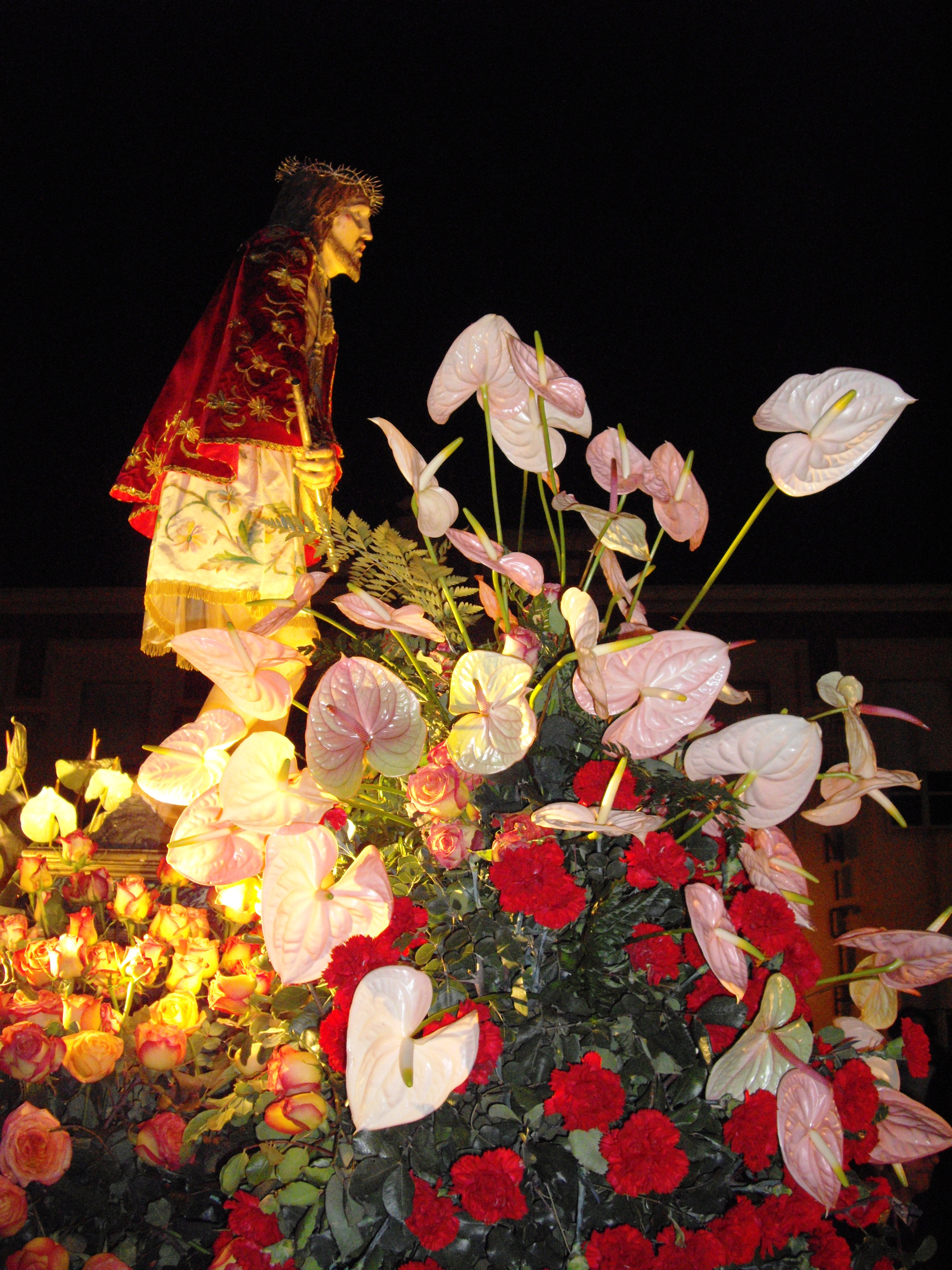

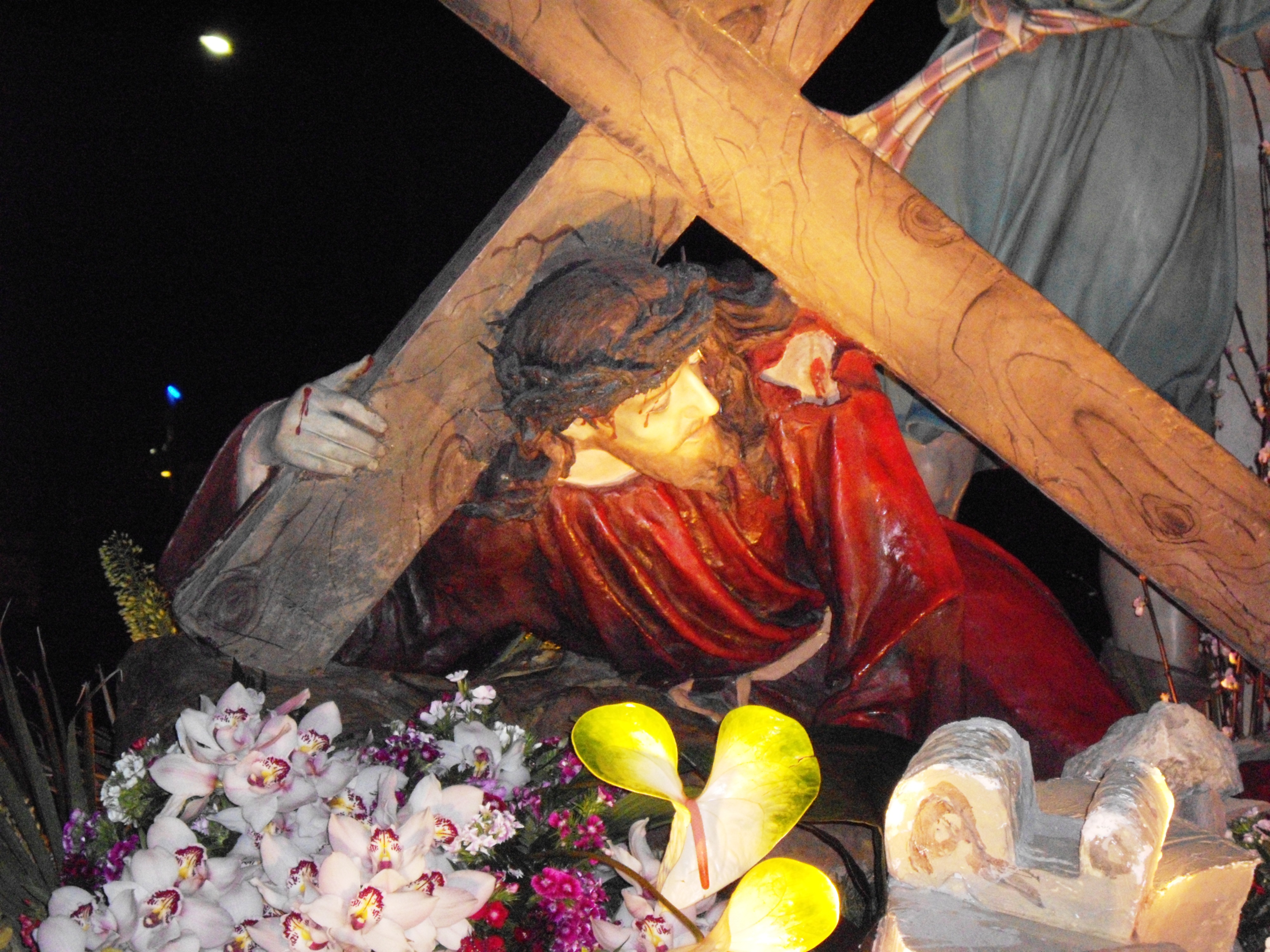

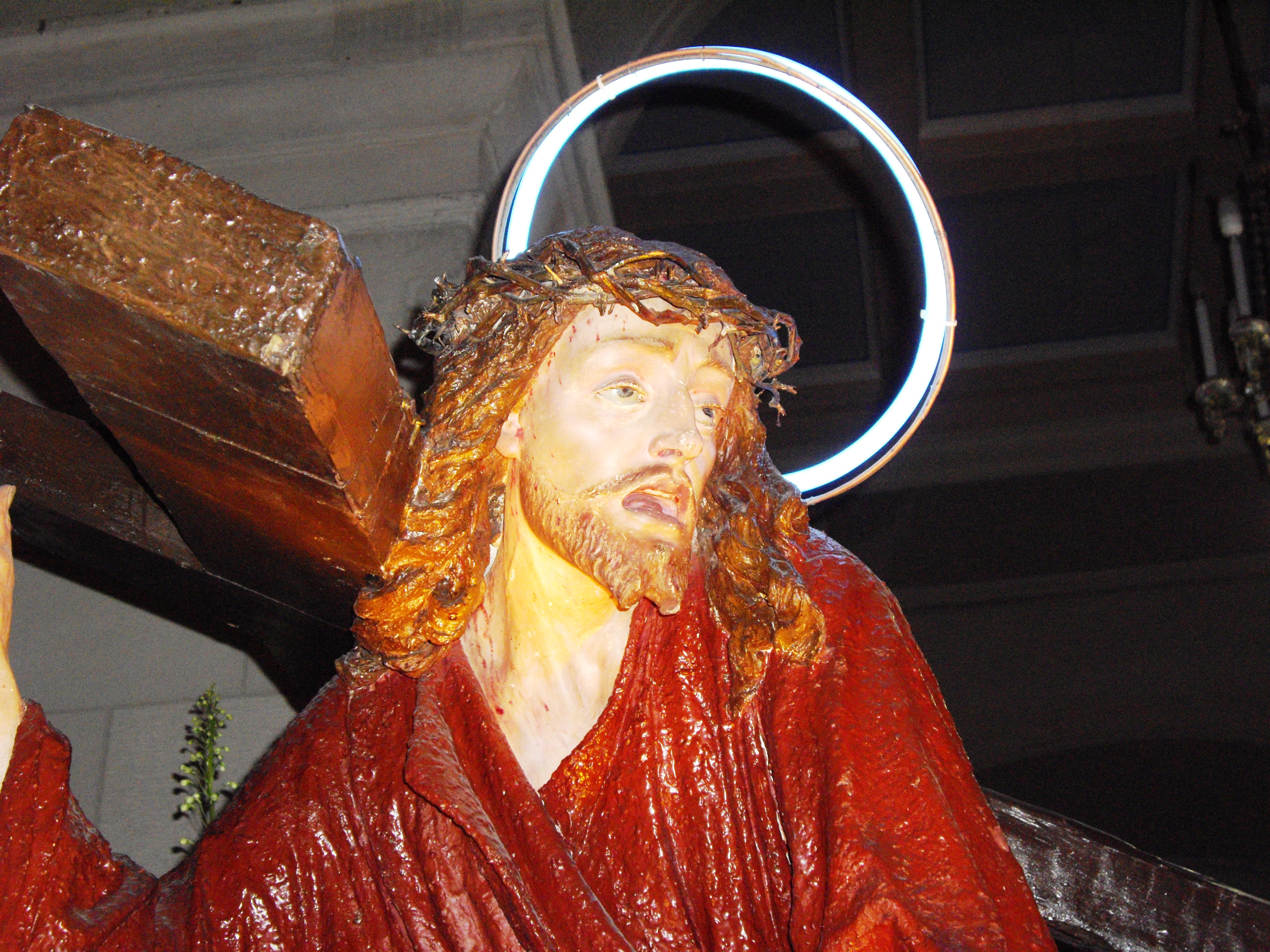

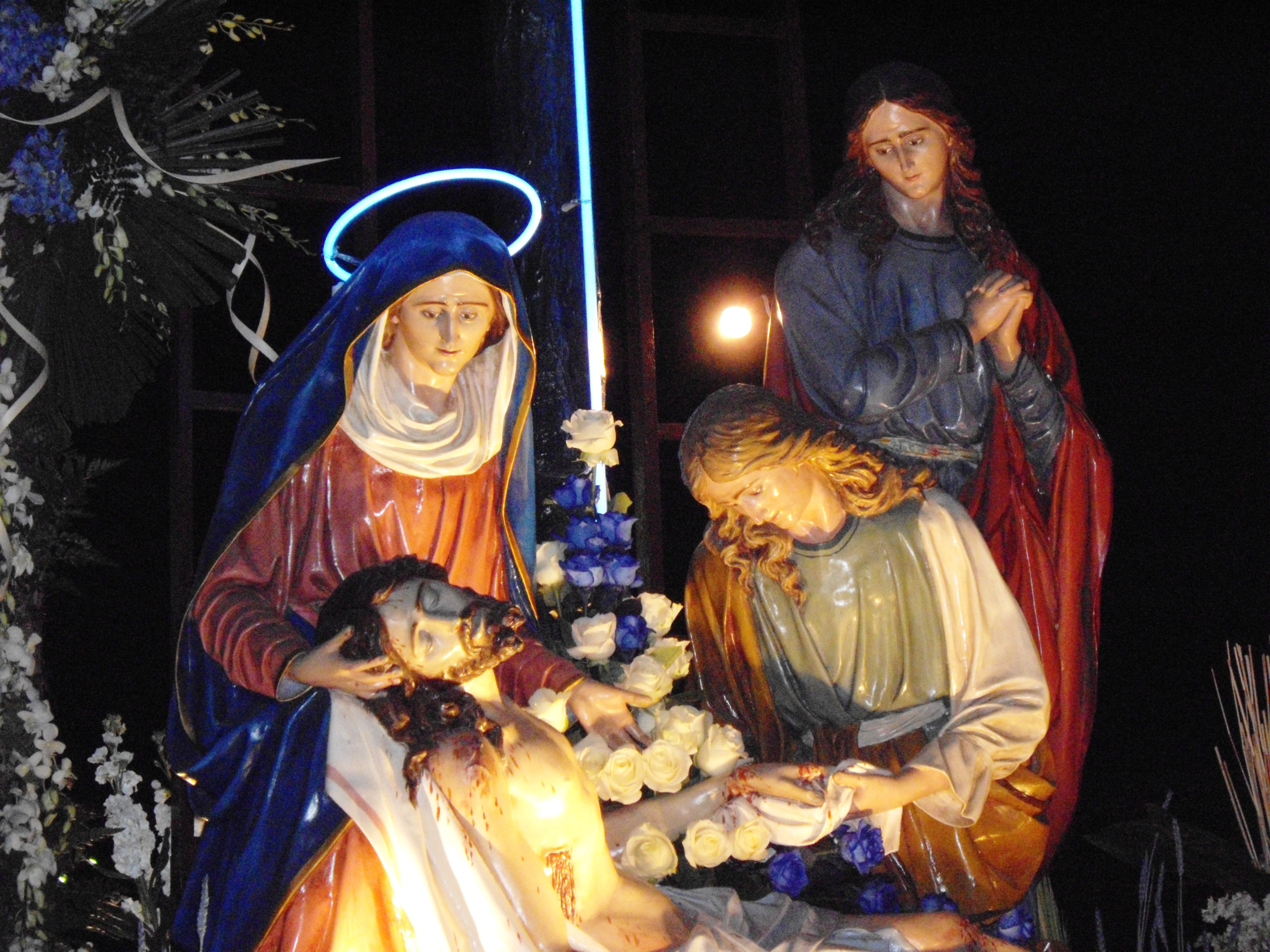

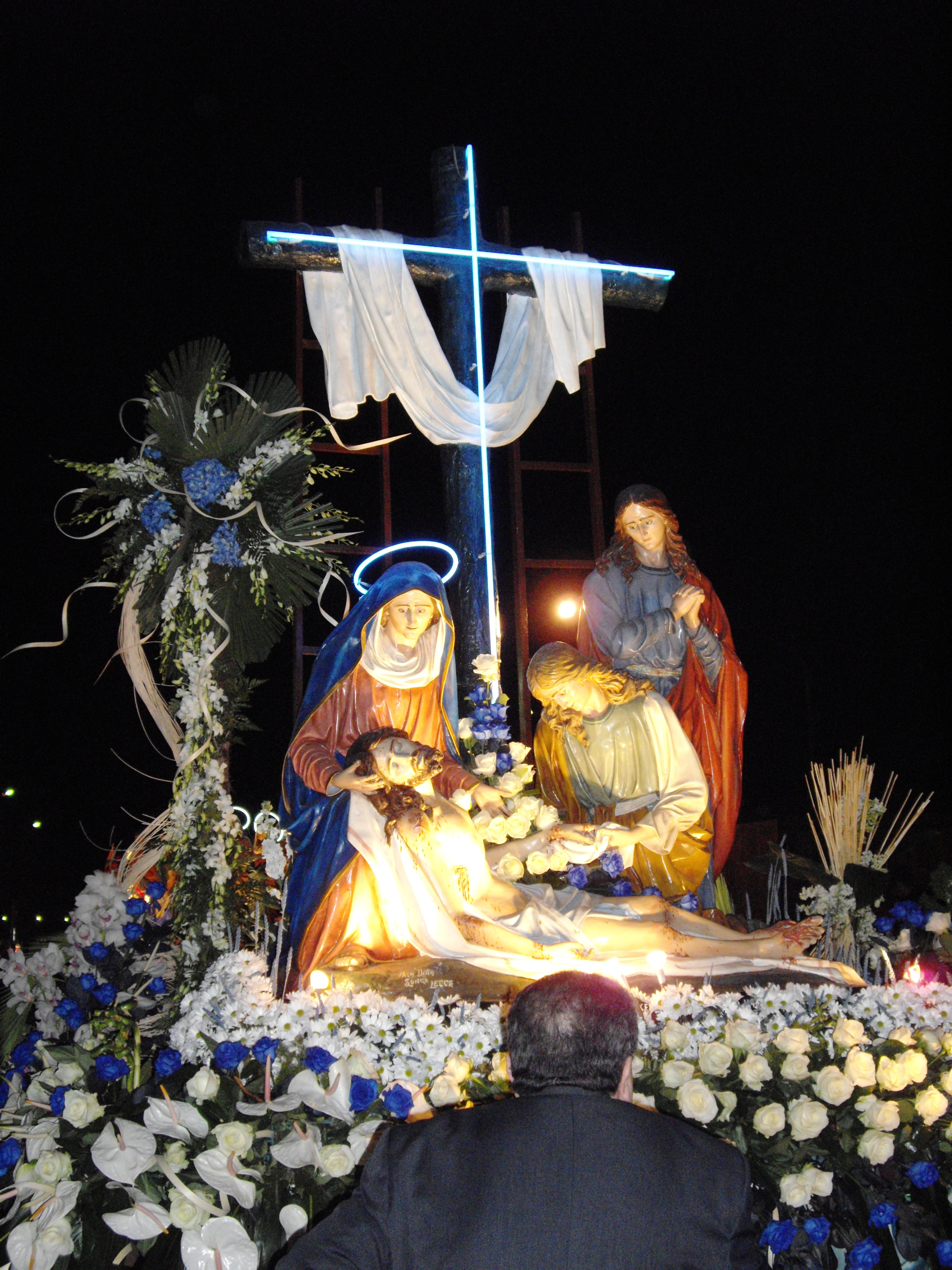

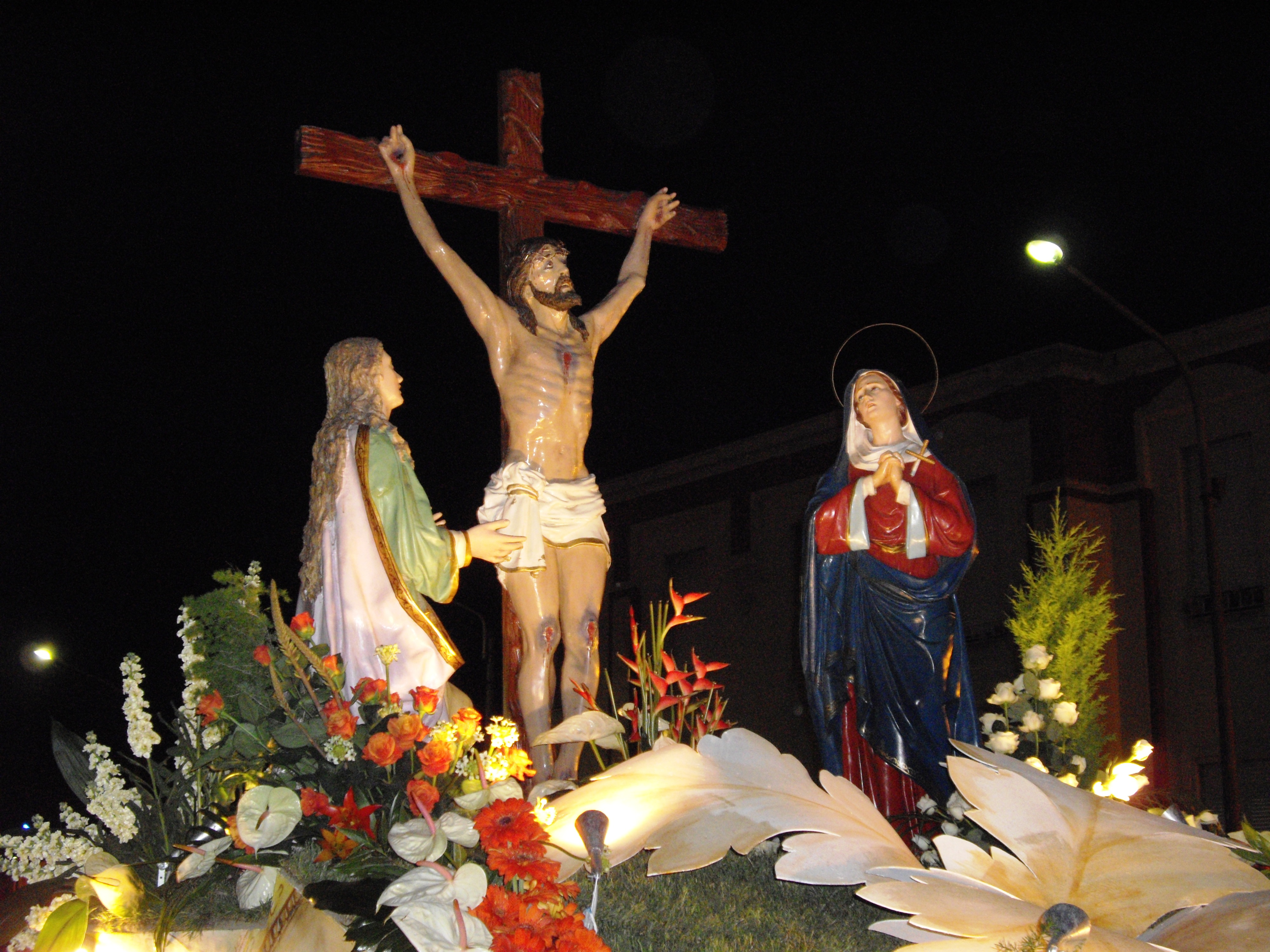

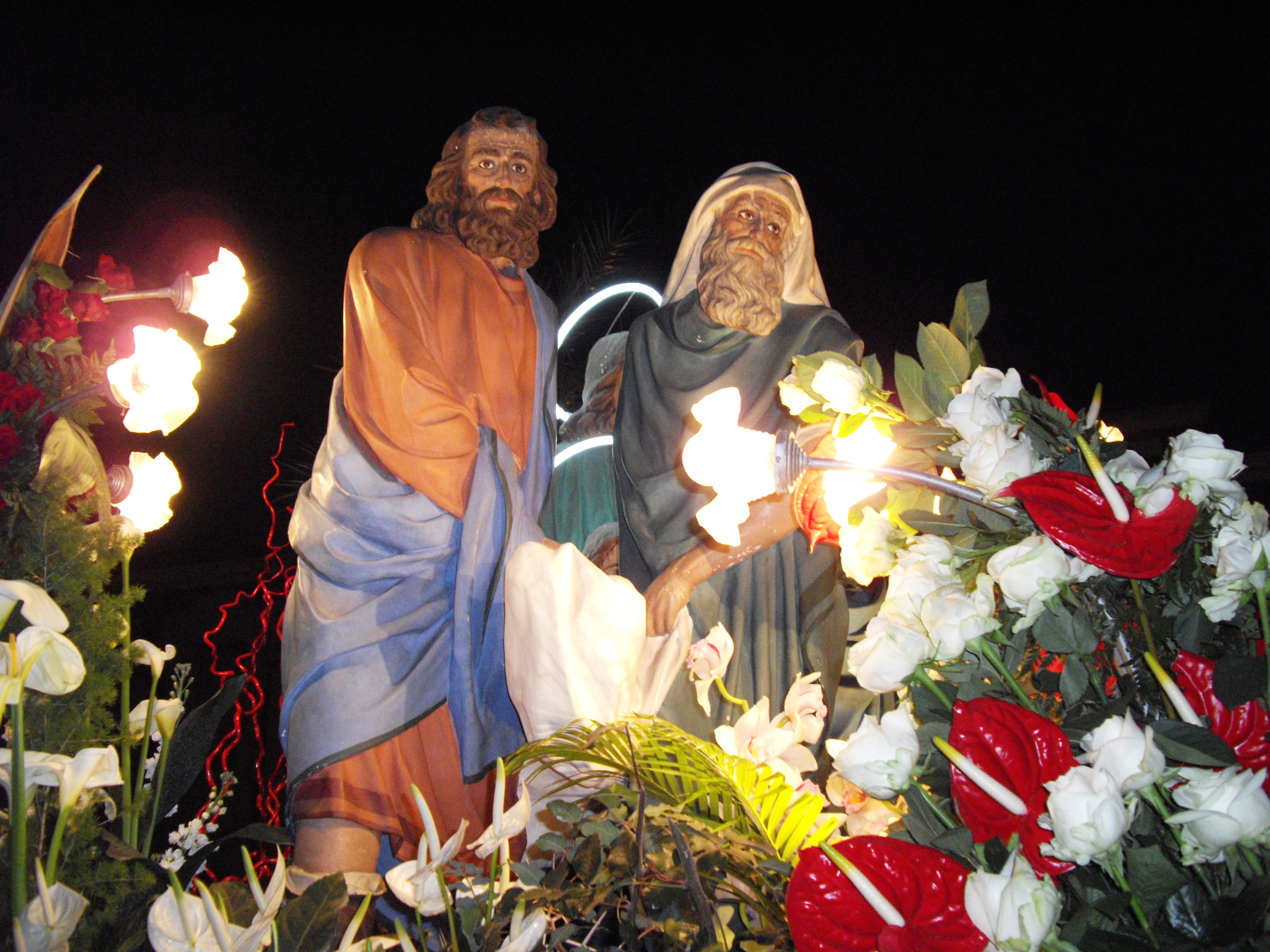

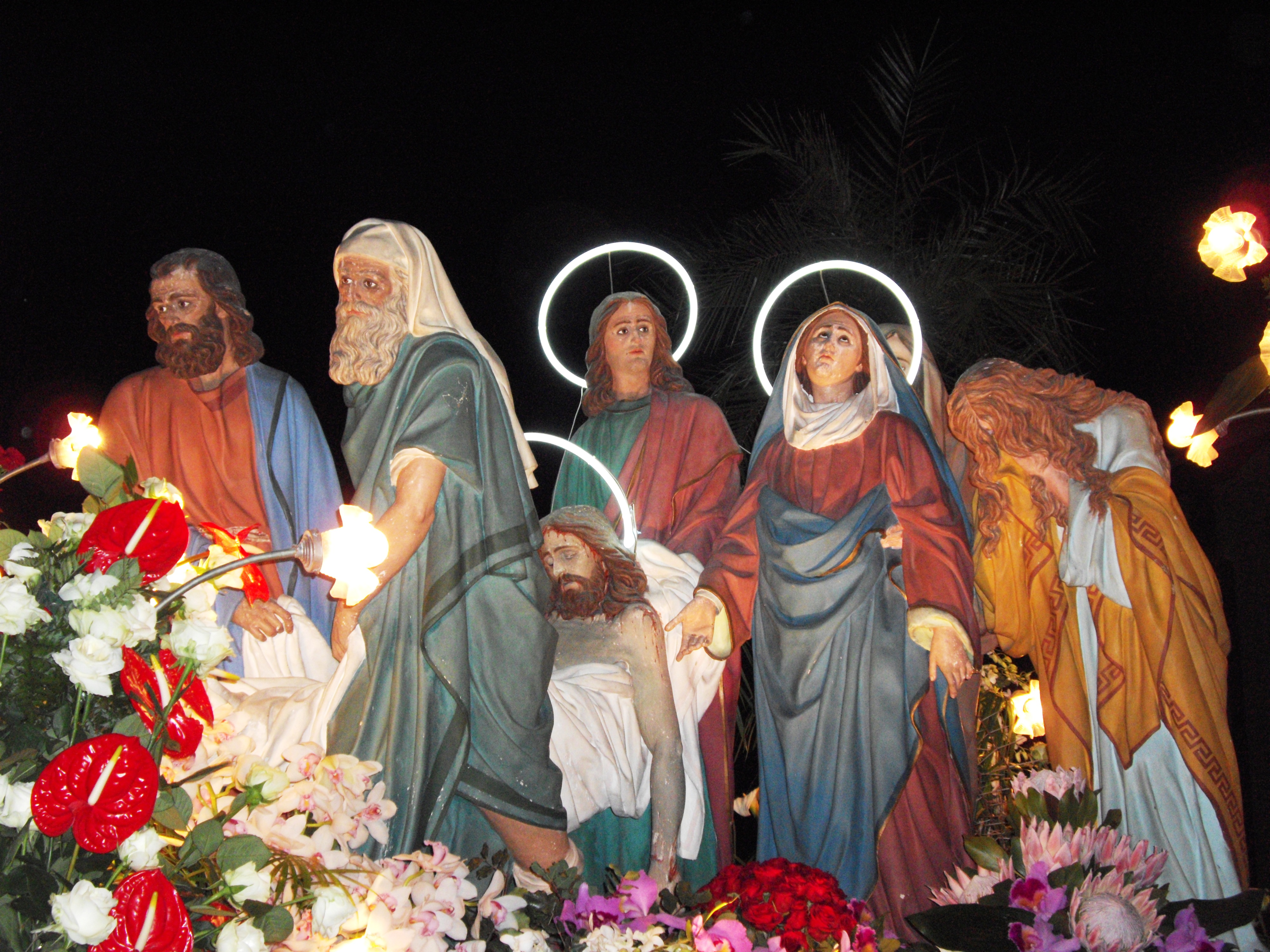

== See also ==
- Catholic Church in Italy
- Holy Week
- Holy Week in Mexico
- Holy Week in Spain
