= Kulich (bread) =

Type of Russian Easter bread

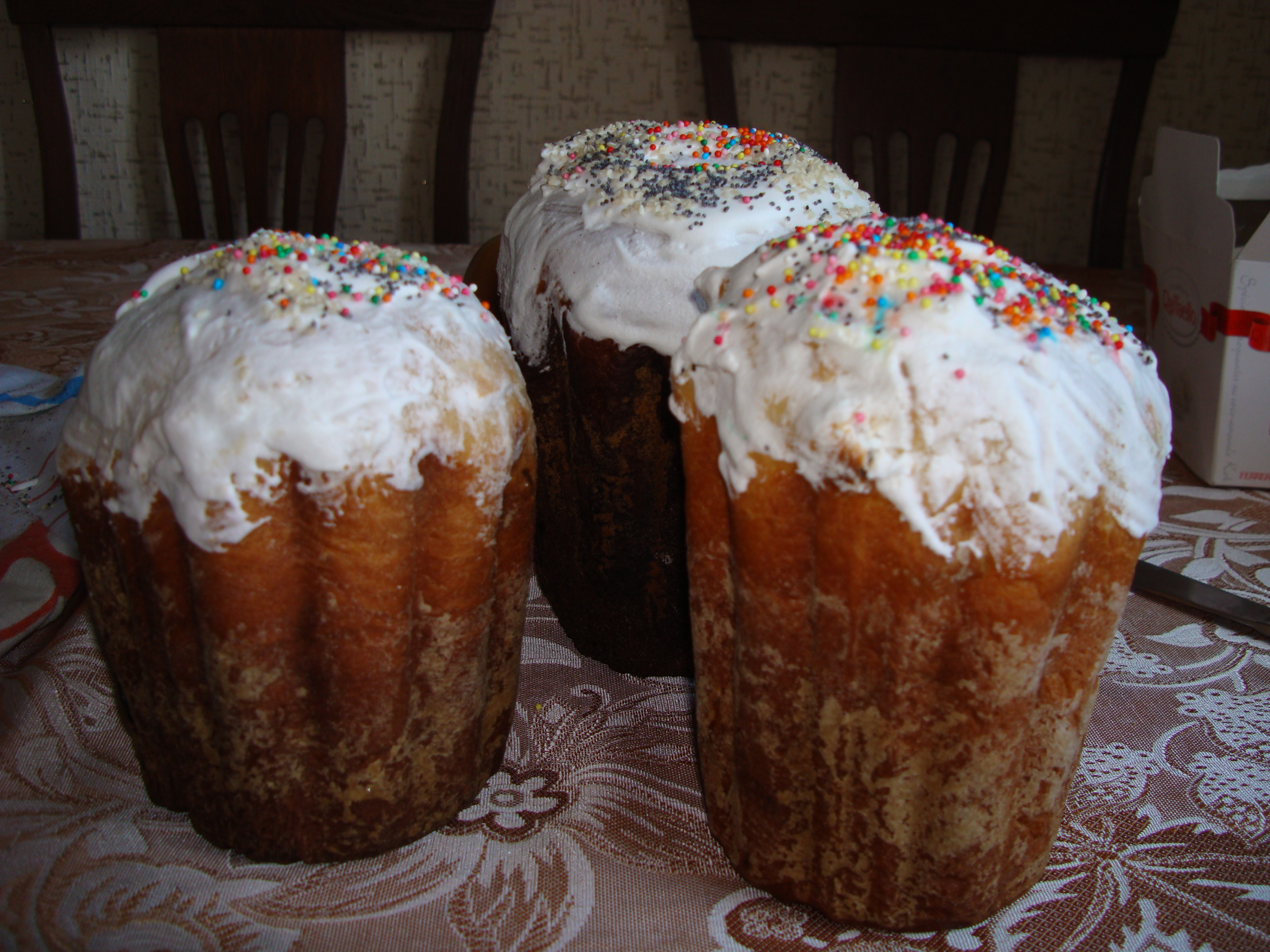
- Type: Yeast cake
- Course: Before breakfast

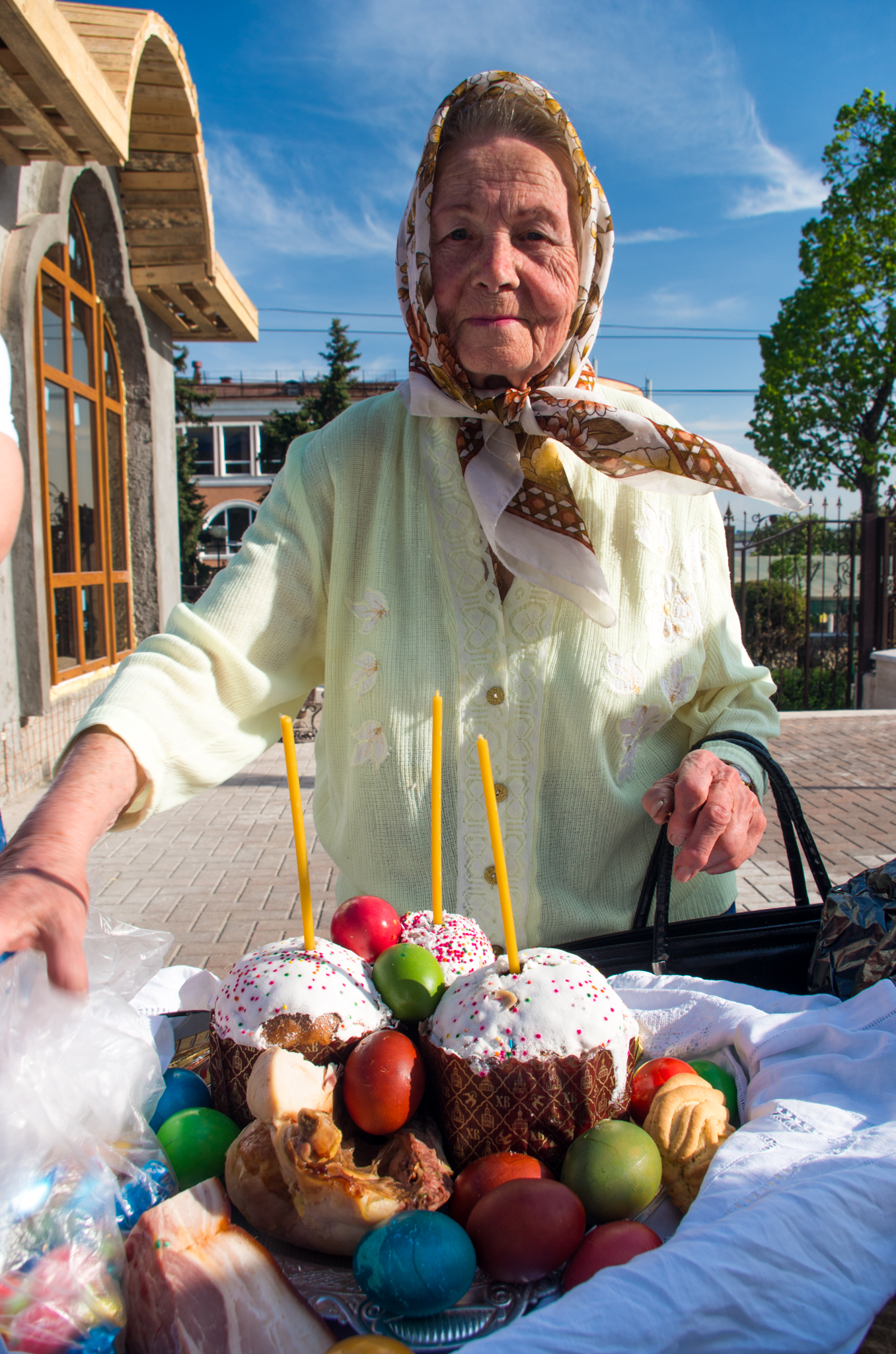
Babushka with Kulich bread and colorful Easter eggs, Pyatigorsk, Stavropol region, Russia

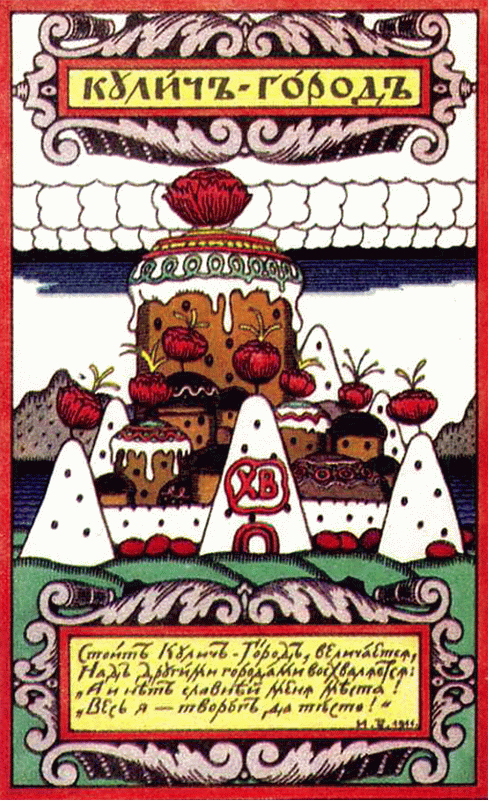
This illustration by Ivan Yakovlevich Bilibin from Russia uses old Russian language orthography that can be translated to a modern rendition along the lines of "Kulich-city is standing, glorifying itself; Lauding itself over other cities; There is no other place better than me!; For I am all tvorog and dough! The Х and the В are for Христос воскрес ("Christ is Risen")

Kulich (Note: Russian: кули́ч, romanized: kulích, Belarusian: куліч, romanized: kulich, Armenian: կուլիչ, romanized: kulich (from Ancient Greek κόλλῑξ, romanized: kóllīx, "roll of coarse bread"); Georgian: პასკა, Ukrainian: пáска, romanized: páska) is the Russian name for Easter bread. For the eastern Slavs, festive bread is round and tall, and dough decorations are made on top of it. The cylindrical shape of the cake is associated with the church practice of baking artos. The Paska bread tradition spread in cultures which were connected to the Byzantine Empire and is a traditional cultural part of countries with an Orthodox Christian population. It is eaten in countries like Russia, Belarus, Ukraine, Romania, Armenia, Georgia, Moldova, North Macedonia and Serbia. Kulich is a variant of paska Easter breads and represents not only Easter but also the spring. Easter is a very important celebration in Eastern European countries, even more important than Christmas.

In an entry in The Oxford Companion to Sugar and Sweets, food historian and artist Alicia Rios described Kulich as "unmistakably" phallic, which she characterized as "[betraying] the pagan traditions that underlie Christian celebrations".

== Preparation ==
Traditionally after the Easter service, the kulich, which has been put into a basket and decorated with colorful flowers, is blessed by the priest. Blessed kulich is eaten before breakfast each day. Any leftover kulich that is not blessed is eaten with paskha for dessert.

Kulich is baked in tall, cylindrical tins (like coffee or fruit juice tins). When cooled, kulich is decorated with white icing (which slightly drizzles down the sides) and colorful flowers. Historically, it was often served with cheese paska bearing the symbol ХВ (from the traditional Easter greeting of Христос воскрес (Khristos voskres, "Christ is risen").

Kulich is only eaten between Easter and Pentecost.

The recipe for kulich is similar to that of Italian panettone, but is denser and thus weighs considerably more.

== Gallery ==
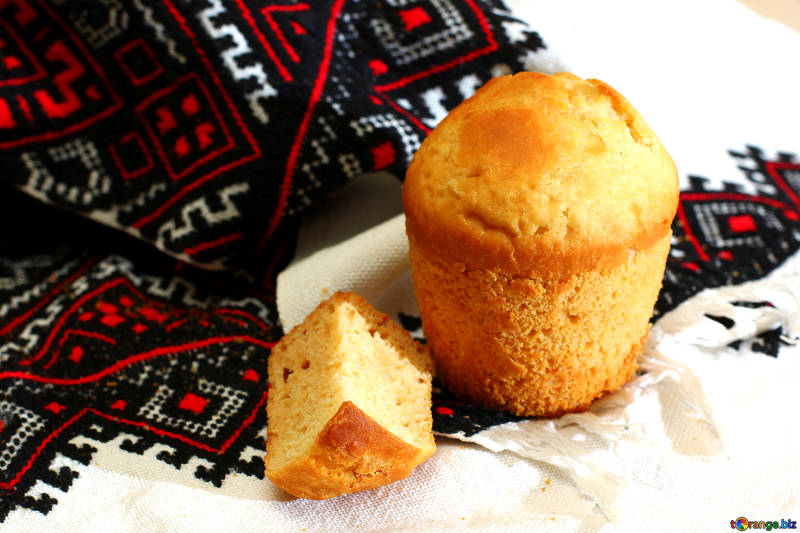
Russian paska bread Kulich without frosting and crumbles

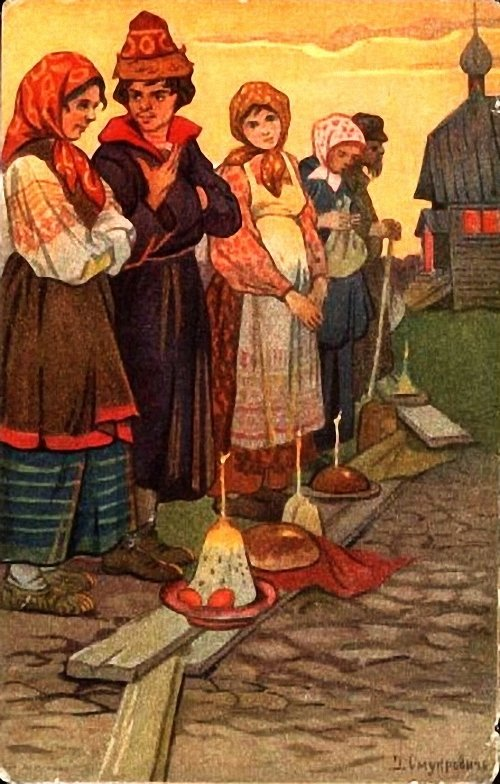
A painting of people with Easter fare

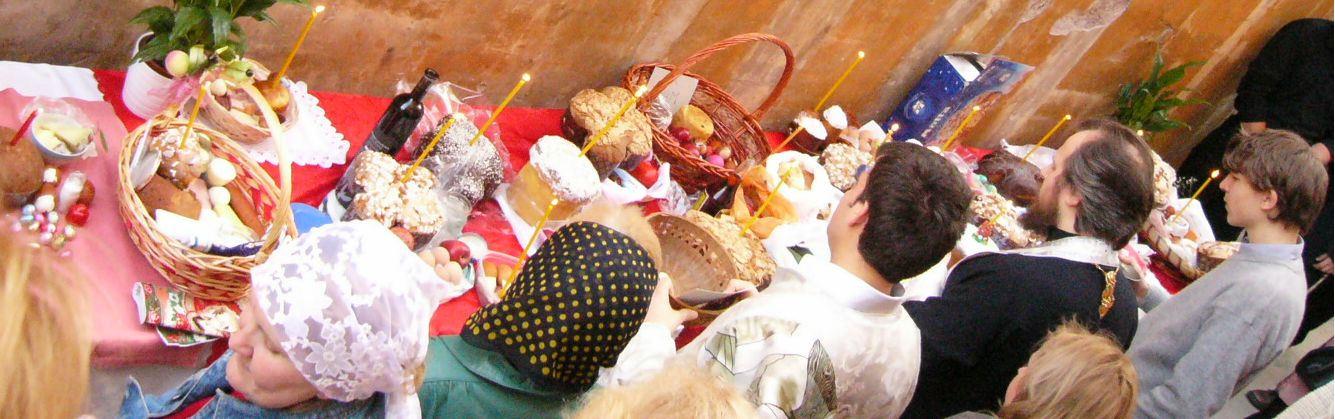
Orthodox Church of Rome priest (second from right) blesses paschal (Easter) foods including kulichs, eggs, and wine

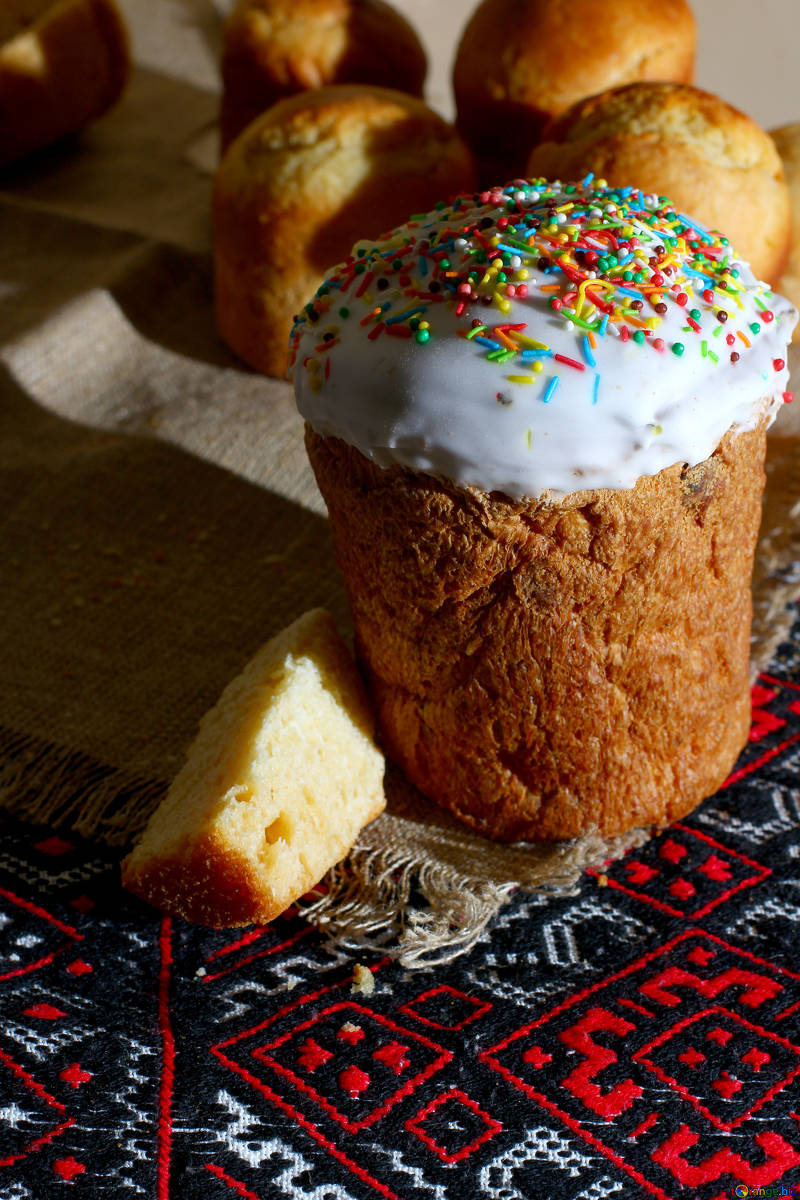
Kulich

== See also ==
- Cozonac
- List of sweet breads
- Panettone
- Paska (bread)
- Pinca
- Red Easter eggs
- Stollen
