= Paskha =

East Slavic festive dish

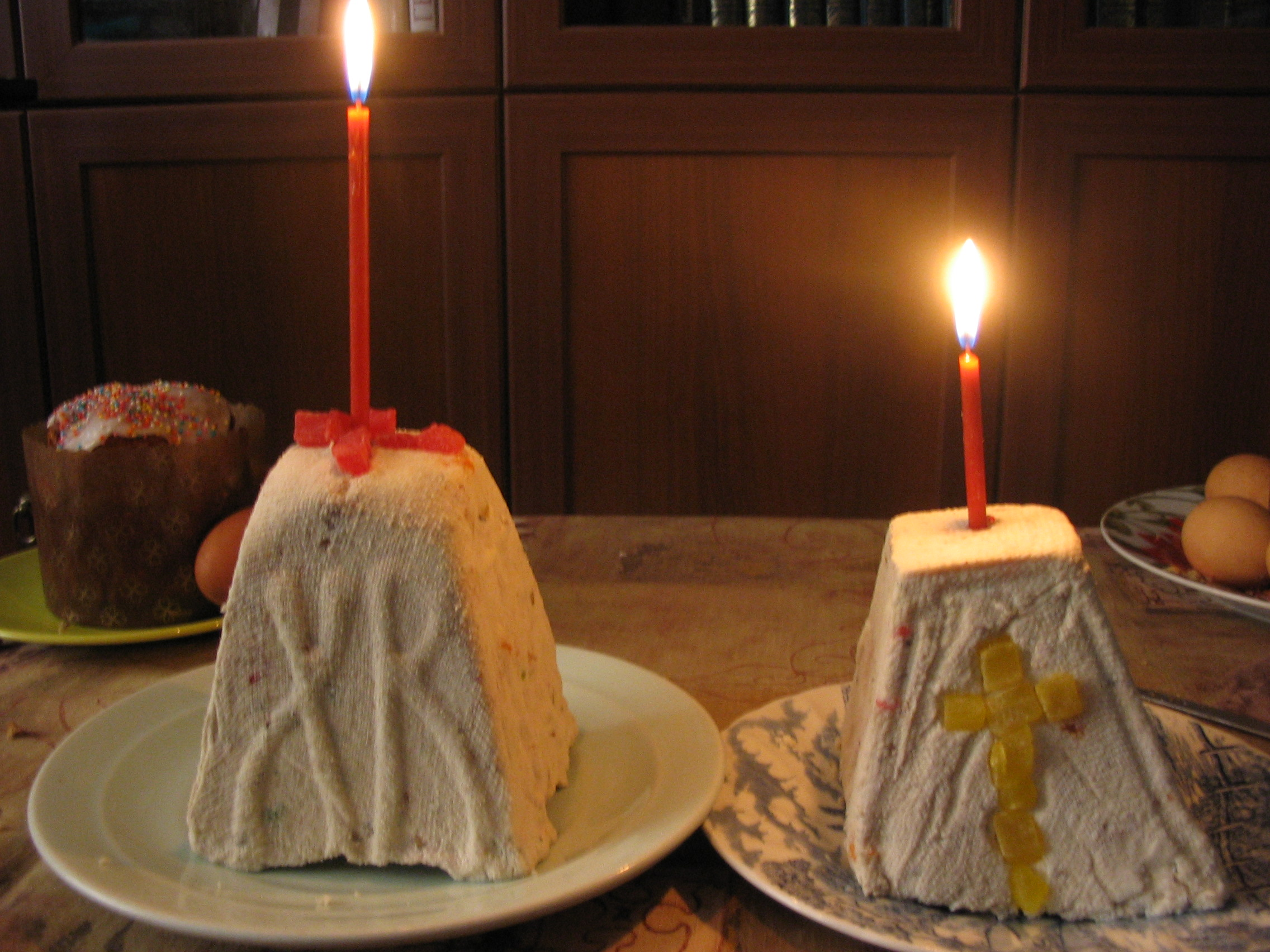
Two paskhas with candles (with a kulich and Easter eggs in the background)

Paskha (also spelled pascha, or pasha; Russian: па́сха; [ˈpasxə]; "Easter") is an East Slavic festive dish made in Eastern Orthodox countries which consists of food that is forbidden during the fast of Great Lent. It is made during Holy Week and then brought to Church on Great Saturday to be blessed after the Paschal Vigil. The name of the dish comes from Pascha, the Eastern Orthodox celebration of Easter. Besides Russia, Ukraine, etc., Pasha is also often served in Finland where it is common among the Orthodox Karelian minority.

Cheese paskha is a traditional Easter dish made from tvorog (like cottage cheese, Russian: творог, romanized: tvorog), which is white, symbolizing the purity of Christ, the Paschal Lamb, and the joy of the Resurrection. It is formed in a mold, traditionally in the shape of a truncated pyramid which symbolizes the first Passover in Egypt, a nod to Christianity's early Jewish beginnings and a reminder that the Last Supper of Jesus was a Passover Seder. Others believe the pyramid is a symbol of the Trinity, the Church; Tomb of Christ). It is usually served as an accompaniment to rich Easter breads called paska in Ukraine and kulich in Russia (where the "paskha" name is also used in the Southern regions). The Easter foods; bread and cheese paska are very rich and made of many dairy items given up during Great Lent. They are brought to church on Easter to be blessed by the priest.

The pascha is decorated with traditional religious symbols, such as the Orthodox three-bar cross, and the letters X and B (Cyrillic letters which stands for Христосъ Воскресе which translates to Christ is Risen).

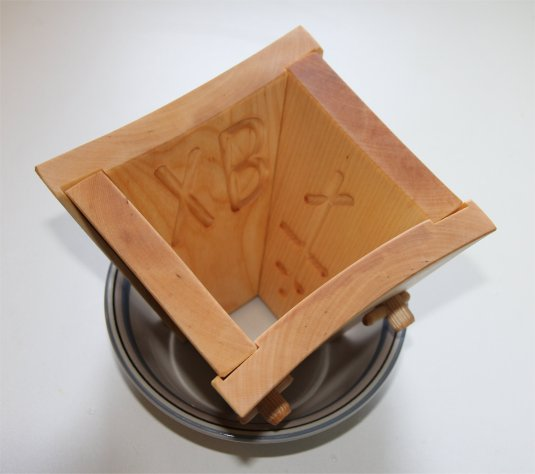
A paskha mould

In addition to the main ingredient (tvorog), additional ingredients, such as butter, eggs, smetana (sour cream), raisin, almonds, vanilla, spices, and candied fruits can be used.

The paskha can either be cooked or uncooked (raw). Cooked paskha is made in the form of an egg custard, to which the remaining ingredients are folded in. An uncooked paskha is made simply of the raw curd and the other ingredients mixed at room temperature. Since uncooked curd cannot be conserved for a long period of time, these paskhas are typically made smaller.

The tvorog is first pressed in order to eliminate the maximum amount of liquid possible, then put twice through a sieve to make a homogeneous mass. If the paskha is cooked, this mass is then heated. The pan containing the mixture is then placed in a container of cold water and progressively cooled. Afterward, it is placed in a traditional wooden mould assembly called pasochnitsa (пасочница), with a layer of cheesecloth protecting the mould. The wooden mould can be taken apart for cleaning; however, more modern materials, such as plastics, are used nowadays. The mould is cooled for twelve hours in a cold, but not freezing place (typically in a cellar or refrigerator). Finally, the paskha is turned out of the mould, the cheesecloth removed, and put on a dish. It may then be decorated with candied fruits, nuts, or flowers. In contemporary times, cheese paska is not always formed in a mould and is sometimes served in a mound on a plate.

The paskha (or at least a portion of it) will be placed in an Easter basket together with other festal foods, and taken to church to be blessed.

== Gallery ==
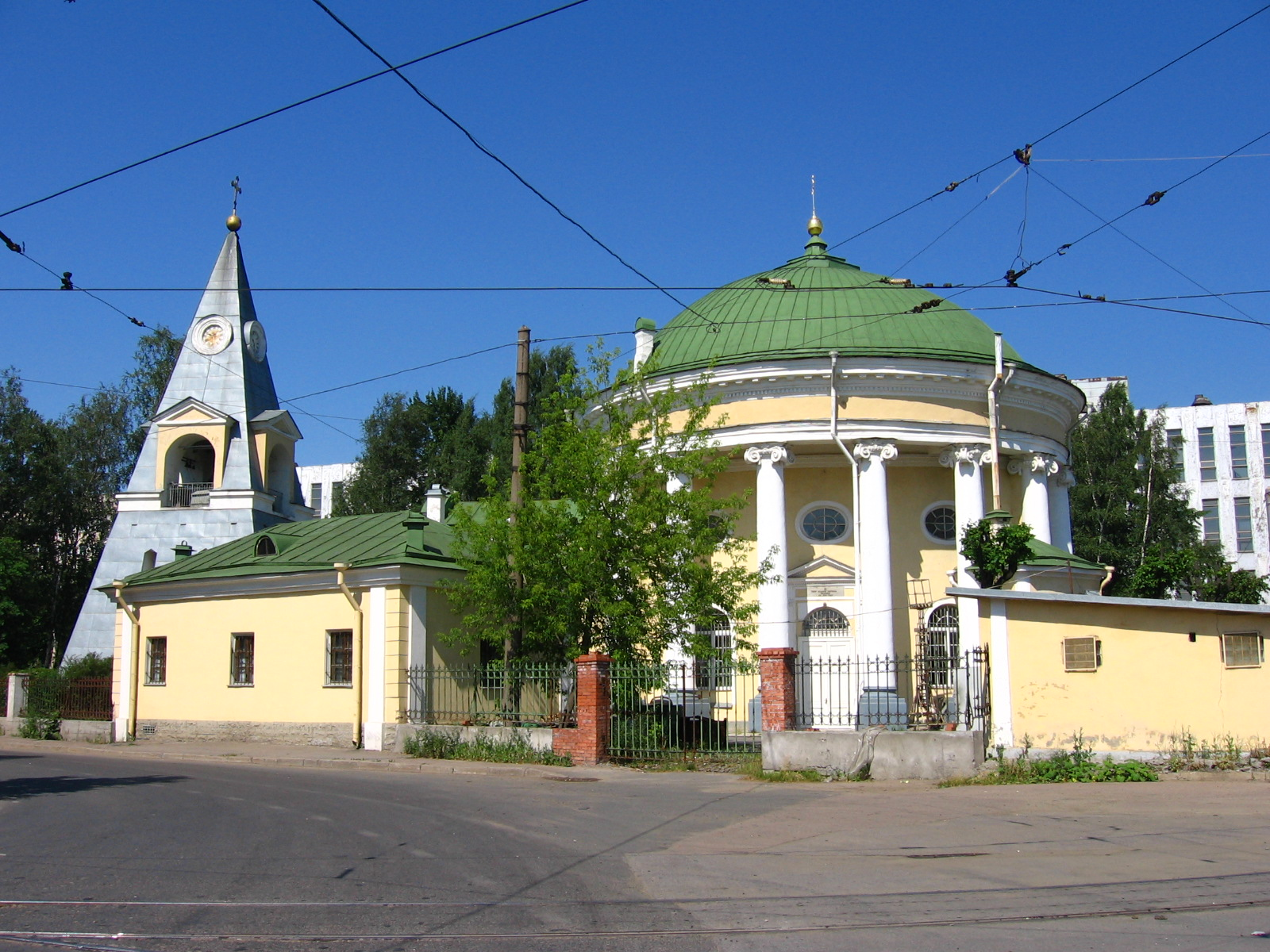
An 18th-century Troitskaya church in St. Petersburg, known as "Kulich and Paskha", because the rotunda of the church resembles kulich, while the adjacent belfry has a pyramidal form reminiscent of paskha.

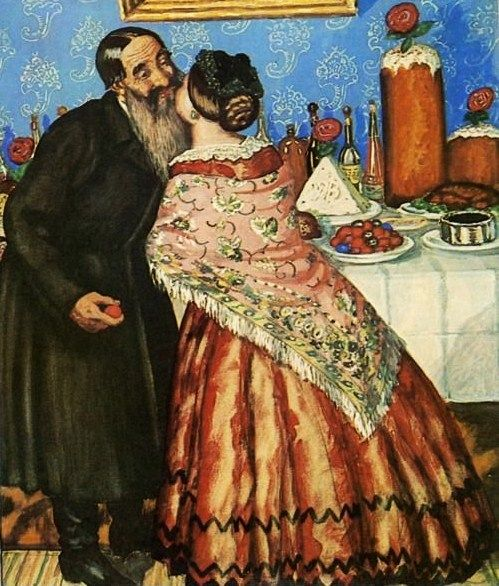
Boris Kustodiev's Easter Greetings (1912) shows traditional Russian khristosovanie (exchanging a triple kiss of peace), with such foods as Easter eggs, kulich and a white, triangular cheese paskha in the background

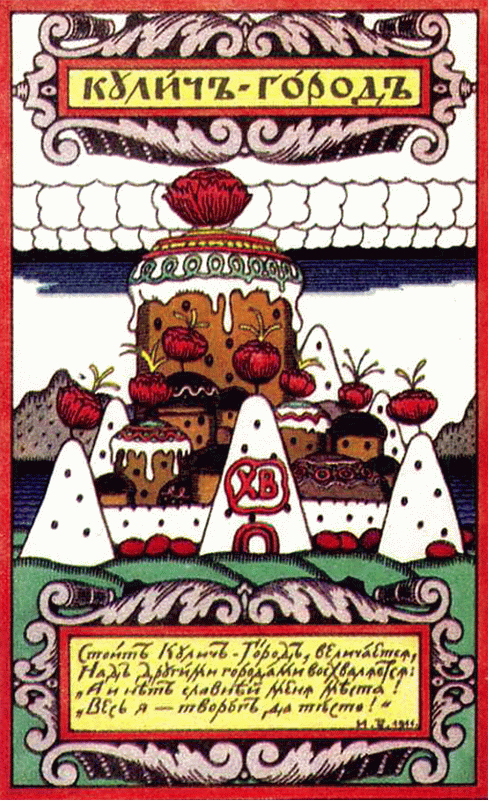
Postcard design by Ivan Bilibin displaying cheese paskhas around kulich. "Kulich-city is standing, glorifying itself; Lauding itself over other cities; There is no other place better than me!; For I am all tvorog and dough!"

== See also ==
- Paska (bread)
- List of Russian dishes
