= Easter cake =

Cakes prepared for Easter

Easter cakes (breads) are cakes prepared and served during the Easter season. Sharing a cake with family for Easter is an Easter tradition in many denominations and countries.

== Background ==
Often what is meant by traditional Easter cakes are sweet yeasted doughs, enriched with eggs and butter. These holiday breads have been made for centuries before the invention of modern baking powder. They were sometimes shaped like animals - in Germany the cakes were shaped like hares, a symbol of Ēostre, and a precursor of the modern Easter bunny. In Italy the preferred shape was the dove, symbolic of Christ's innocence and ascension. These holiday cakes often include candied fruits, a luxury reserved for special occasions.

By the 1950s baking powder cakes had become household staples. In Germany, sponge cake was baked in the shape of lambs and decorated with powdered sugar. In modern times even traditional recipes like gugelhupf and babka have been adapted to be made with baking powder.

== Types ==
=== Babka or baba ===
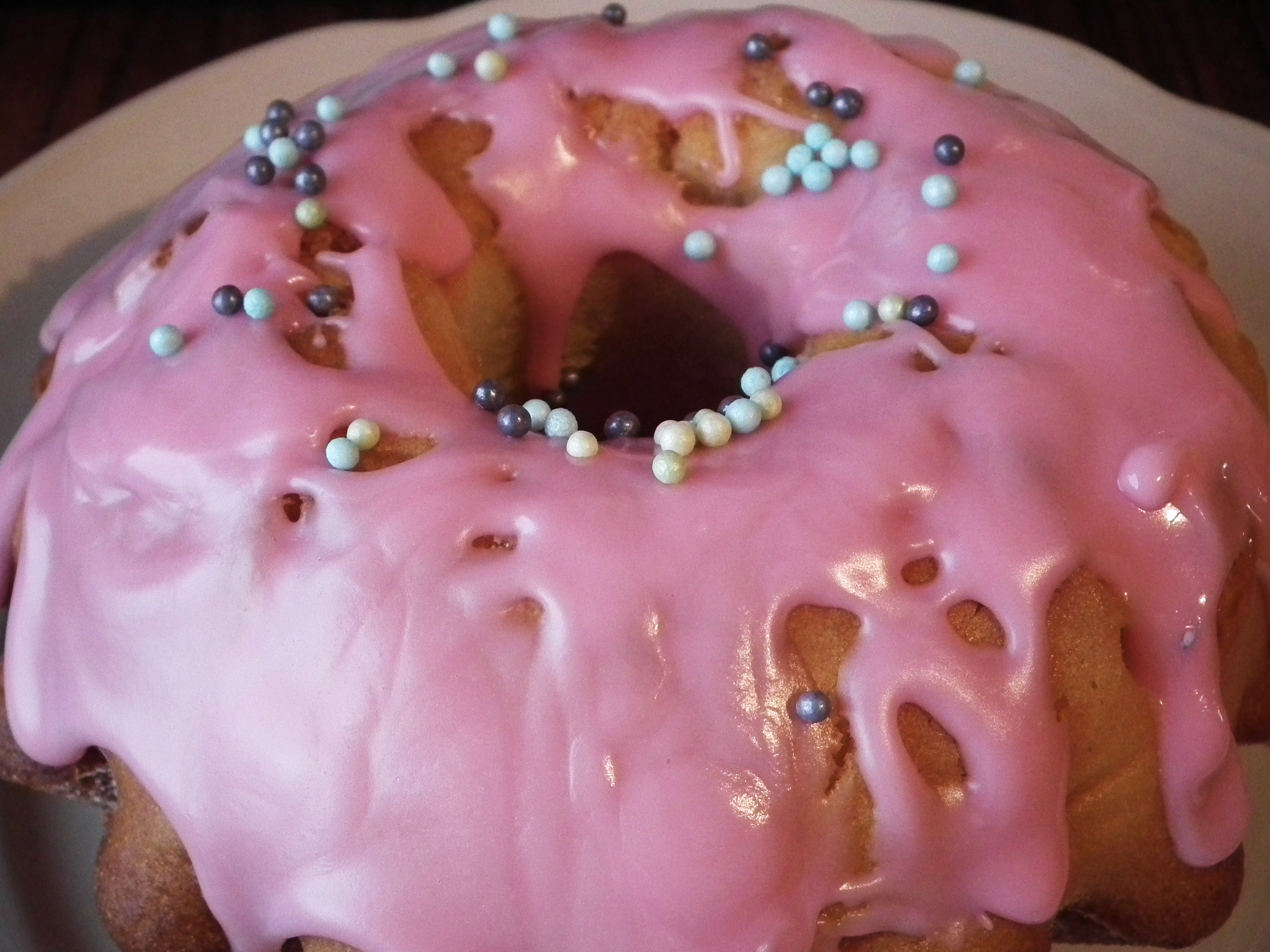
Easter babka cake

Easter babka (baba wielkanocna) is a yeast cake that is part of Poland's Easter traditions. Made with raisins, and other dried and candied fruits, the cake is soaked in rum syrup before it's served.

The cake is also the forerunner of the French baba au rhum (and Neapolitan babbà) via Polish king Stanisław Leszczyński's exile in Wissembourg, Lorraine, France, in the 18th century.

=== Paska ===
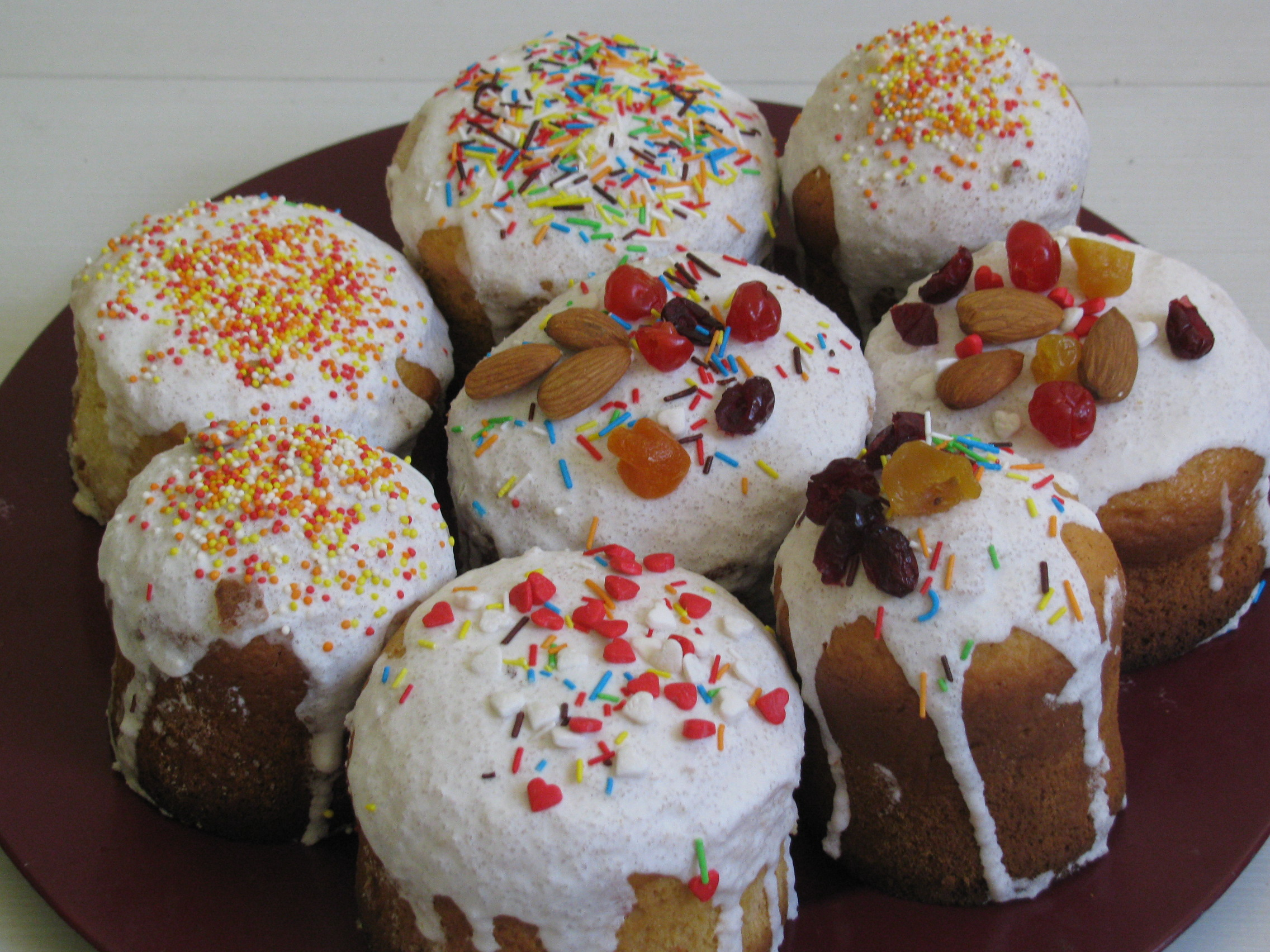
A plate of frosted Ukrainian Paska (bread) cakes

Paska is part of the Easter traditions of several countries, including Ukraine, Belarus and Georgian (in Russia is Kulich). Similar to Italian panettone, it's made with yeast instead of baking powder. The cake is often decorated with Christian symbols.

It is a famous Ukrainian, Russian and Belarusian tradition to take the cake to Holy Saturday services so it can be blessed before Easter breakfast.

=== Mazurek ===
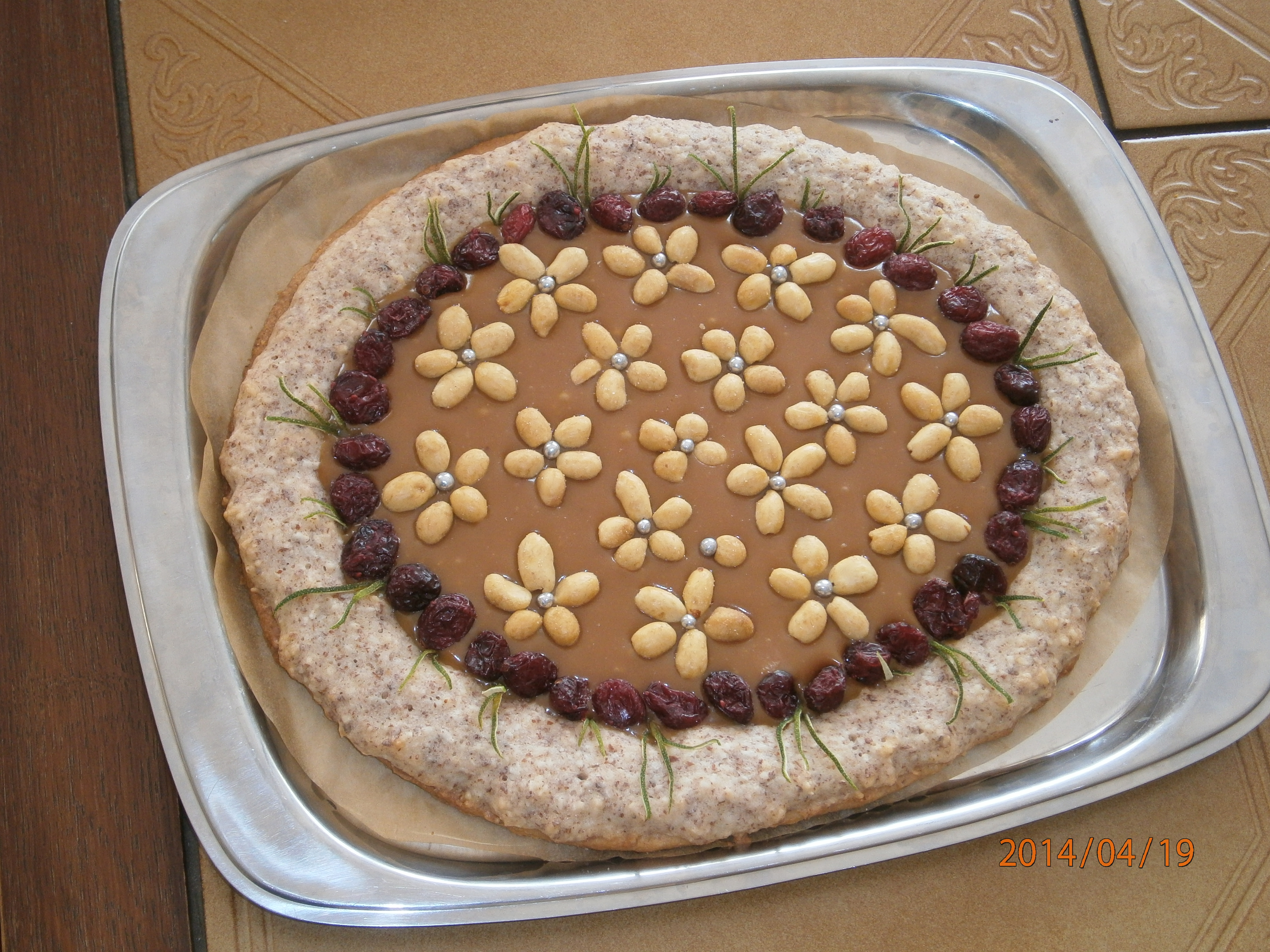
Egg-shaped mazurek cake

Mazurek is a Polish easter cake made with short pastry with butter cake "glued" together with a layer of marmalade.

=== Simnel cake ===
Simnel cake has become associated with the Easter season, but according to Davidson it was not always traditional to Easter.

== See also ==
- Easter bread
