= Cozonac =

Sweet leavened bread, traditional to Bulgaria and Romania

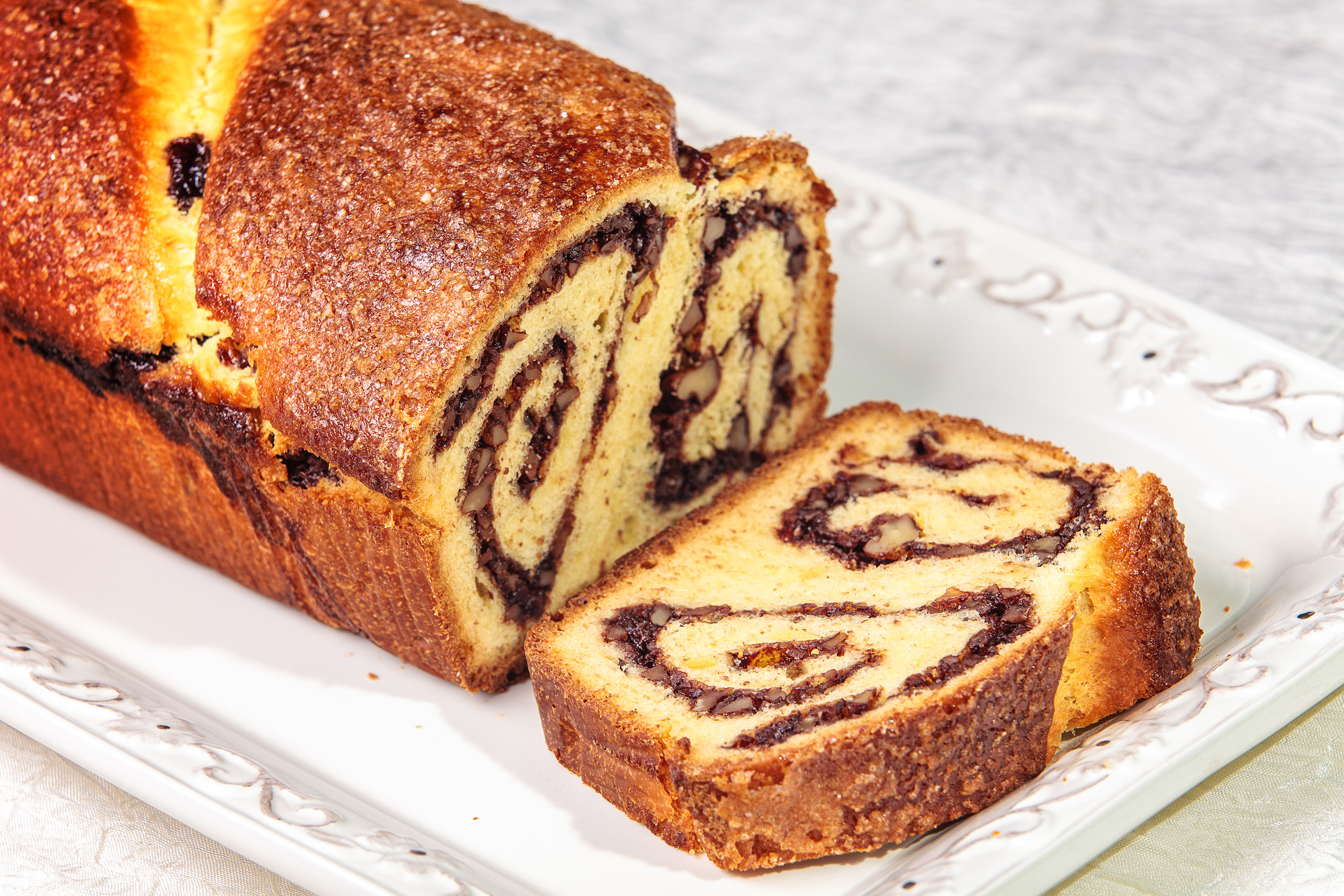
- Cozonac with raisins and walnut filling
- Alternative names: Bulgarian: козунак, romanized: kozunak
- Type: Yeast cake
- Course: Dessert
- Region or state: Bulgaria, Romania, North Macedonia, Serbia, Moldova
- Main ingredients: Wheat flour, butter, milk, eggs, sugar, yeast, raisins, citrus peel, flavorings like vanilla or rum
- Variations: Poppy seed, walnut

Cozonac (Romanian: [kozoˈnak]) or Kozunak (Bulgarian: козунак [kozuˈnak]) is both a sweet bread and a sweet yeast dough that can be used to make different traditional holiday breads and cakes. Often mixed with raisins or nuts, it can be baked as a loaf or rolled out with fillings like poppy seed or walnuts. It is common throughout Southeastern Europe in countries such as Bulgaria, Romania, Greece, Moldova, North Macedonia, and Serbia. Rich in eggs, milk and butter, it is usually prepared for Easter in Bulgaria, Serbia, North Macedonia, and in Romania and Moldova it is traditionally baked during Holy Week, typically on Holy Thursday or Holy Saturday morning. A simplified vegan version without eggs or milk—named Cozonac de post—is also prepared during Lent. The name is thought to originate, via Bulgarian: козунак, either from Greek: κοσωνάκι, romanized: kosōnáki, a diminutive form of κοσώνα, kosṓna, 'doll' or from Greek: κωδουνάκη, romanized: kōdunáki, a diminutive form of κουδούνι, kudúni, 'bell'.

Cozonac was the sweet chosen to represent Romania in the Café Europe initiative of the Austrian presidency of the European Union, on Europe Day 2006.

== Origins ==
A similar Italian dessert, panettone, whose recipe was shared and adapted in Eastern Europe following the Roman occupation, is often mentioned as a starting point for the cozonac.

The earliest known written recipe for cozonac appears in Costache Negruzzi and Mihail Kogălniceanu's 200 Proven Recipes for Dishes, Pastries and Other Household Works, published in Iași in 1841. Subsequent Romanian cookbooks document further elaborations: Christ Ionnin's Romanian Cuisine (Bucharest, 1865) includes a version enriched with butter, eggs, sugar, and raisins, while Ecaterina Steriady's The Good Housekeeper describes a more complex preparation incorporating rum, rose water, and lemon zest. Over time, Romanian recipes incorporated additions such as cocoa, walnuts, and lokum, producing a distinctive regional version of the dish which was not to be missed from any Easter or Christmas table for hundreds of years and is widely recognized as a traditional dessert.

The cozonac spread southward along the Danube during the nineteenth century, primarily through Romanian and Hungarian influence. Vasil Cholakov, writing of the Danubian town of Svishtov in the 1870s, recorded that residents would knead fine flour with butter, honey, and eggs into braided, decorated loaves which they called kozоnaci. Contemporary Bulgarian sources treated the pastry as a novelty of European urban culture, distinct from the traditional braided Easter bread known as kravay; Bulgarian cookbooks only began to include cozonac recipes from 1895 onwards, and the spelling of the word itself remained unsettled well into the early twentieth century.

Today, cozonac is prepared mainly in southeastern European countries, especially in Bulgaria, Moldova, Romania, and North Macedonia, where it is considered a traditional food.

== Ingredients and preparation ==
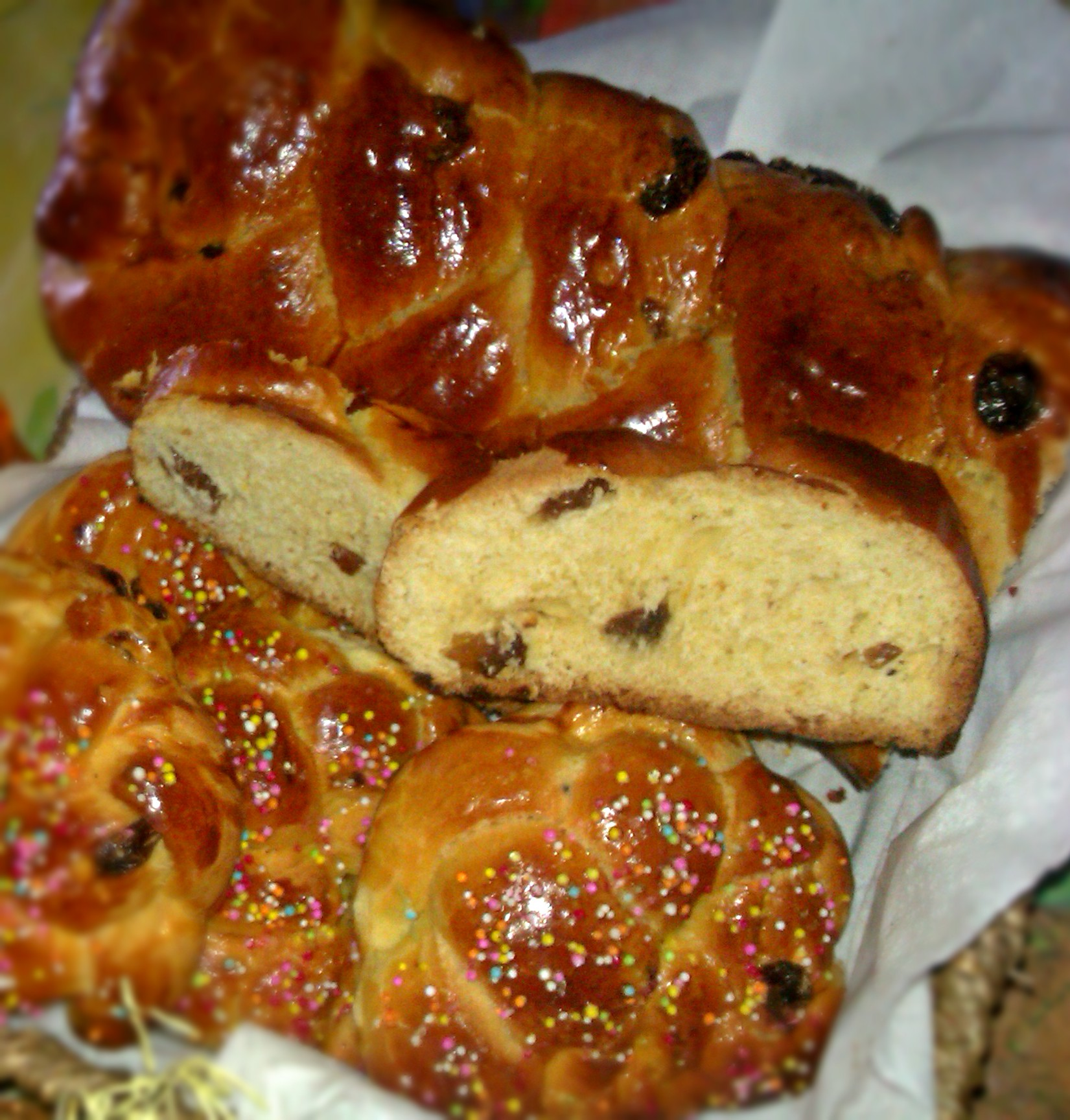
Braided kozunak with raisins

Cozonac is a sweet bread, into which milk, yeast, eggs, sugar, butter, and other ingredients are mixed together and allowed to rise before baking. In Bulgaria, the kozunak is prepared by adding lemon zest to the dough mixture, just as the Romanian version.

In North Macedonia, kozinjak, also called milibrod, is prepared with sultanas and raisins in the shape of a girl's plated hair, a braid, as derived from the Bulgarian word for hair (коса/kosa). In the past, Macedonians would lay upon a straw-pleated mat, called Rogozina (or Ruguzina), which they would place on the ground.

In Romania, the recipes for trimmings differ rather significantly between regions. The dough itself is similar throughout the country; a plain sweet bread made from flour, eggs, milk, butter, sugar and salt. However, depending on the region, one may add to it any of the following: raisins, grated orange or lemon zest, walnuts or hazelnuts, and vanilla or rum flavor. Cozonac may also be sprinkled with poppy seeds on top.

Other styles more akin to the poppy seed roll dictate the use of a generous filling, taking up as much as half the product's volume, usually a ground poppy seeds and sugar mixture or ground walnut and sugar mixture, with optional cocoa powder, rum essence or raisins. The dough is rolled flat with a pin, the filling is spread and the whole is rolled back into a shape vaguely resembling a pinwheel. In the baked product, the filling forms a swirl adding to the character of the bread.

== Similar breads ==
Examples of breads similar to cozonac from other cultures include badnji kruh in Croatian cuisine, folar de páscoa in Portuguese cuisine, brioche in French cuisine, kulich in Russian cuisine, panettone in Italian cuisine, hot cross bun in English cuisine, challah in Jewish cuisine, Shoreek in Egyptian cuisine, or stollen in German cuisine. Such rich brioche-like breads are also traditional in other countries, such as Hungary and the Czech Republic.

== See also ==
- List of sweet breads
- Fruitcake
- Raisin bread
- Pain aux raisins
- Pască
- Tsoureki
