= Tvorog =

White European cheese

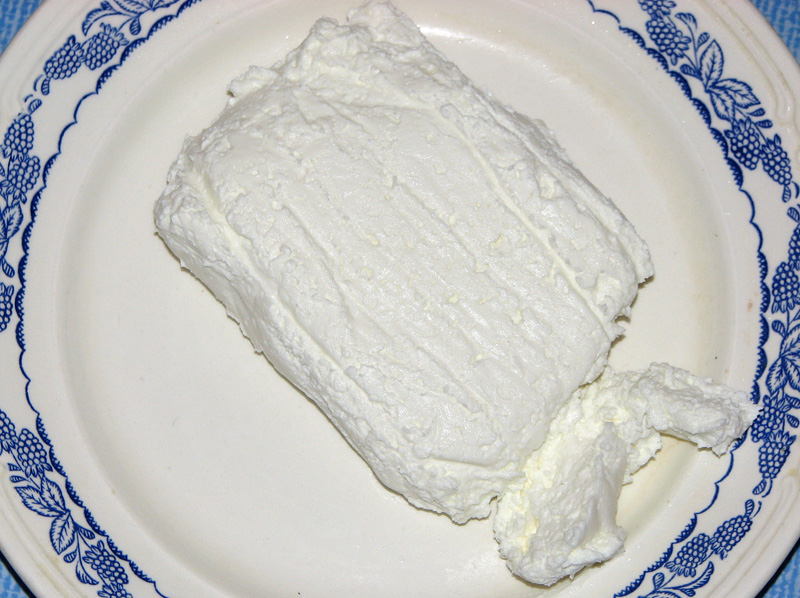
- Tvorog or twaróg
- Other names: white cheese (Polish: ser biały)
- Country of origin: Central and Eastern Europe
- Source of milk: low-fat cow milk
- Texture: soft and creamy soupy
- Fat content: 0–23%

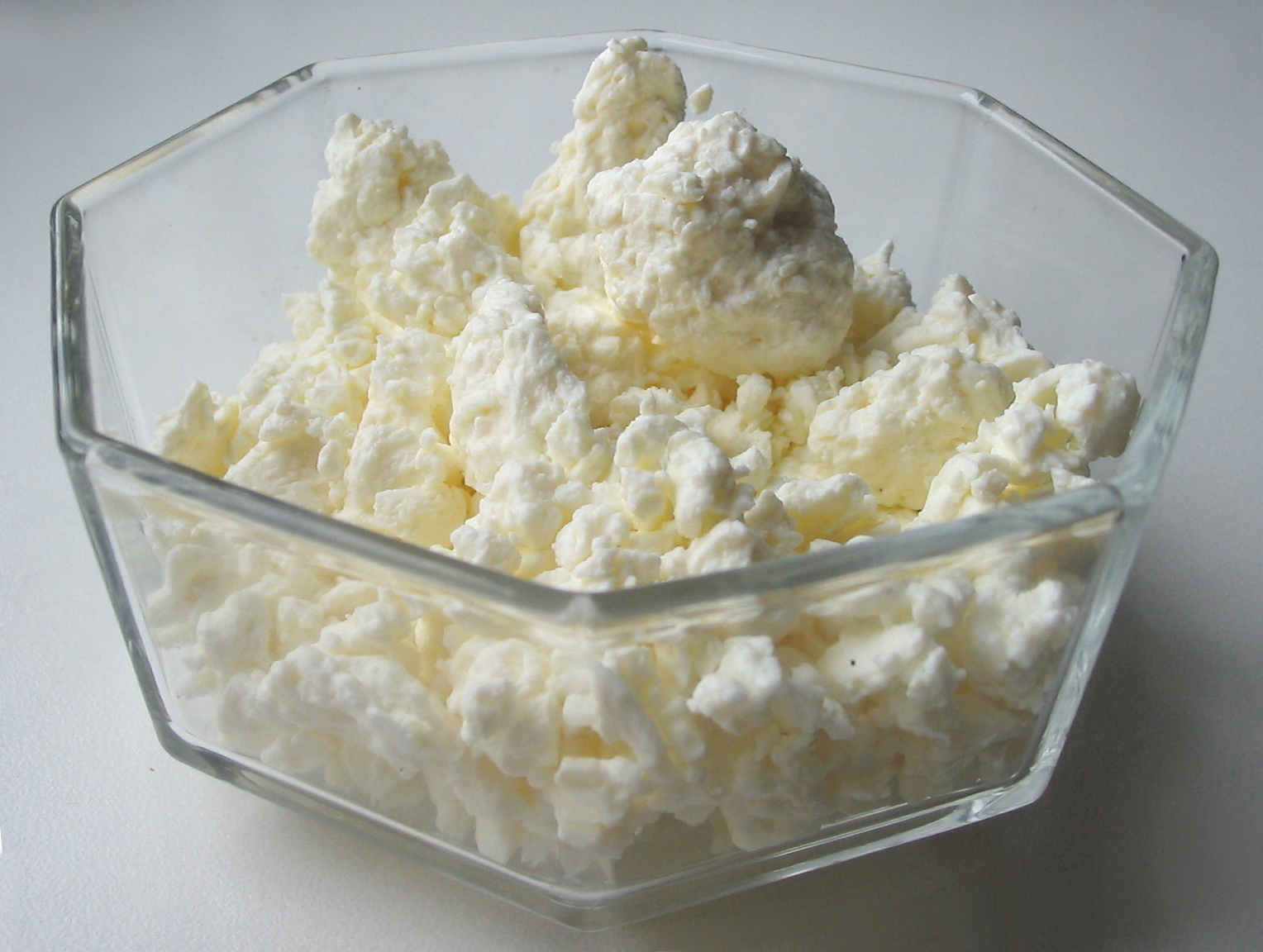
Tvorog grained

Tvorog (Note: Czech: tvaroh; Slovak: tvaroh; Polish: twaróg, Russian: творог; (Note: Historically, only the second syllable could be stressed, but in modern Russian, the stress can be placed on either of the syllables.) Lithuanian: varškė; Hungarian: túró; Ukrainian: сир, romanized: syr; Slovene: skuta.) is a soft, white, fermented milk product, traditionally made in regions of Central, Eastern and (less commonly) Northern Europe. Like curd, tvorog is obtained by fermenting milk, with subsequent whey removal. In the Anglosphere, cottage cheese is considered a type of young soft cheese, while among speakers of modern Russian, tvorog is usually not considered a type of cheese. Hungarian cow's milk túró should not be confused with the curd cheeses of Slavic peoples, as Hungarian túró has a crumbly, grainy texture, is drier and more pronounced in flavour, and is made without aging; by contrast, the curd cheeses of Slavic peoples (known as tvorog) are smoother, creamier, mildly tangy, and more homogeneous in texture.

Traditionally prepared tvorog is customarily classified according to its fat content. According to the GOST standards, tvorog is classified, based on physical and chemical properties, into several categories: fat-free, low-fat, classic, and fatty. Depending on their method of production, types of tvorog are distinguished as simple, soft, and grained (which is a type of low-fat tvorog). Tvorog made with milk fat substitutes (such as vegetable oils) is considered a "curd product", and cannot be legally classified as tvorog.

In countries of the former Soviet Union, tvorog is made and directly consumed fresh or sweet. In other countries of Central and Eastern Europe, it is consumed fresh or salted, while in Northern Europe it is mostly consumed salted. Tvorog is consumed to a small extent in Great Britain, North America, and Japan, and is almost completely absent in Southern Europe and other parts of the world.

== Etymology ==
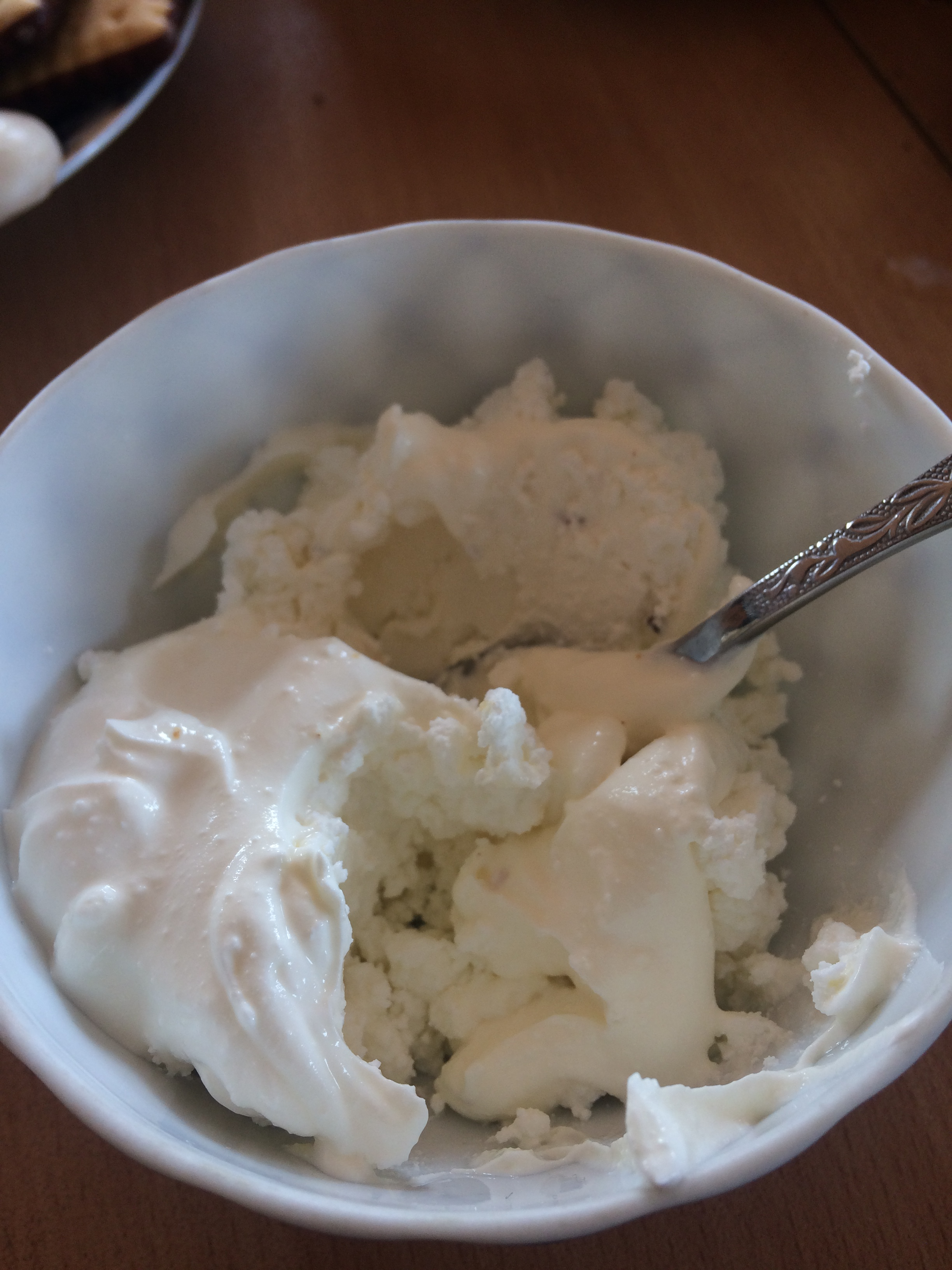
Tvorog with sour cream and sugar

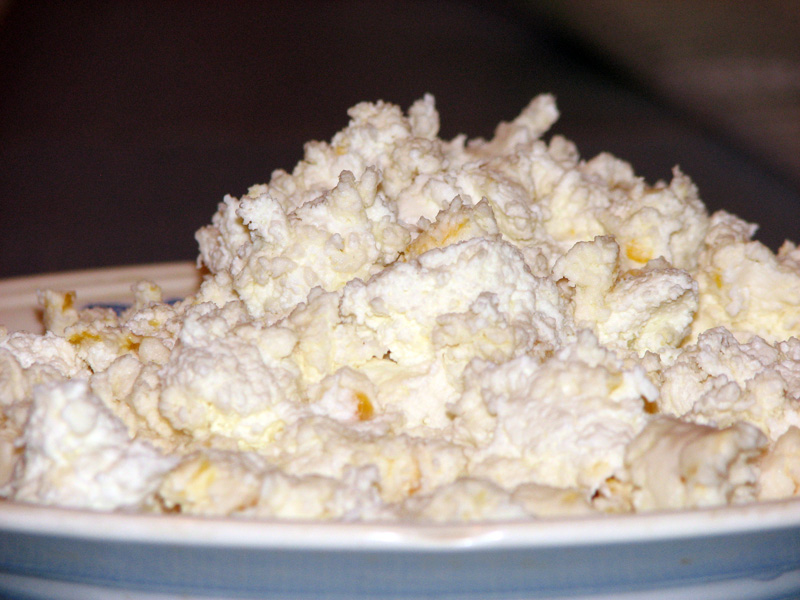
Tvorog

Comes from Proto Slavic *tvarogъ — from the same basis as to create, that is, processed milk.

Many dictionaries indicate two stresses in the word "творог", however, in normalized speech, in particular on radio and television, as well as in a number of reference books, the stress on the second syllable is considered preferable.

== Types of tvorog ==
According to the method of preparation (production), there are two ways to produce tvorog - traditional (regular) and separate. According to the method of coagulation of milk proteins in the traditional way, tvorog is divided into acid and acid-rennet.

- Sour curd is usually made from skimmed milk. In this case, the protein coagulates under the action of lactic acid, which is formed in the process of lactic acid fermentation, which develops as a result of adding starter cultures to milk.
- Acid-rennet curd differs from acid curd in that during its production, rennet (or pepsin) and starter cultures of lactic acid bacteria are used simultaneously to coagulate milk proteins.
- The separate method differs from the usual one in that the purified milk is separated in order to obtain skimmed milk and cream, the mass fraction of fat in which is 50–55%. Fat-free tvorog is obtained from skimmed milk. In this case, acid-rennet coagulation of milk proteins is used to obtain a clot. Fat-free tvorog is cooled and mixed with cream.

By properties

- Fat (19–23%)
- Classic (4–18%)
- Bold (non-greasy) (1.8%)
- Fat-free

By fillers

- With additives (raisins, dried fruits, nuts, candied fruits, chocolate chips, etc.)
- Calcined

== Manufacture ==
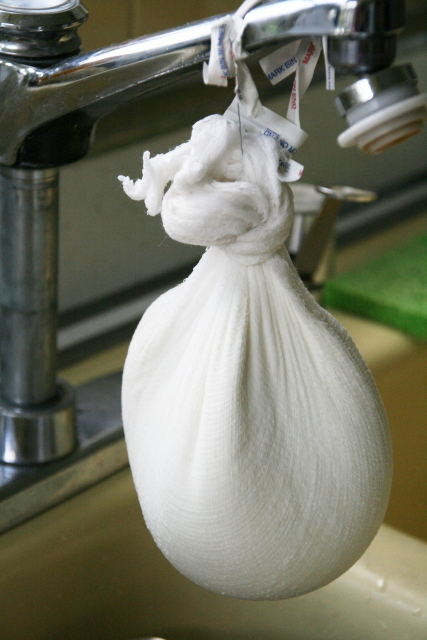
Traditional method of extraction from milk

The traditional way of making tvorog involves the use of fermented milk with the separation (squeezing) of liquid whey in free-hanging bags. The finished tvorog has a dense texture, smooth edges on the break, the separated whey is transparent, slightly greenish in color. When using fermented milk, the curd will turn out sour.

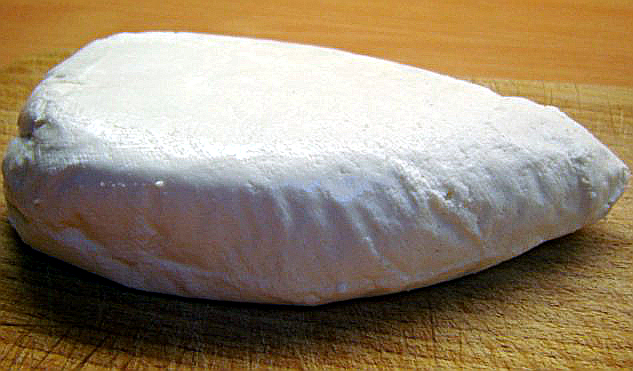
Polish twaróg in the traditional wedge shape

The process of industrial production of tvorog is following: milk first is normalized (the desired fat content is set), pasteurized and poured into baths (containers). The baths maintain a certain temperature (28–30 °C; 82–86 °F), which is necessary for the normal course of processes. Ferment and pepsin are added to warm milk. After some time (the average fermentation time is 8 hours), a curd grain is formed in the bath, which forms a monolith (milk proteins coagulate and precipitate, forming a sticky mass). Serum begins to separate - a clear yellowish liquid, a by-product of production. At the final stage, the curd monolith is cut with strings into small pieces in order to increase the surface area and facilitate the outflow of whey. Next, the curd grain is squeezed and cooled. At the end of the technological process, the curd is packaged.

== Nutrition ==
According to the Soviet 1981 Dietetic Handbook, tvorog contains:

	fat творог	semi-fat творог	low-fat творог	diet творог
water	0,647	0,710	0,777	0,700
protein	0,140	0,167	0,180	0,160
fats	0,180	0,090	0,006	0,0011
carbohydrates (lactose)	0,013	0,013	0,015	0,010
ash	0,010	0,010	0,012	0,010
sodium (10^{−5})	41	41	44	41
potassium (10^{−5})	112	112	115	112
calcium (10^{−5})	150	164	176	160
magnesium (10^{−5})	23	23	24	23
phosphorus (10^{−5})	217	220	224	224
iron (10^{−5})	0,4	0,4	0,3	0,3
vitamin A (10^{−5})	0,10	0,05	Footprints	0,06
β-carotene (10^{−5})	0,06	0,03	Footprints	0,03
vitamin B_{1} (10^{−5})	0,05	0,04	0,04	0,04
vitamin B_{2} (10^{−5})	0,30	0,27	0,25	0,27
vitamin PP (10^{−5})	0,30	0,40	0,64	0,40
vitamin C (10^{−5})	0,5	0,5	0,5	0,5
vitamin E (10^{−5})	0,38			
vitamin B_{12} (10^{−7})	1,0			
folic acid (10^{−7})	35,0			
copper (10^{−7})	74			
zinc (10^{−7})	394			
fluorine (10^{−7})	32			
energy value (kcal/kg)	2260	1560	860	700
energy value (kJ/kg)	9450	6520	3600	2930

== Consumption ==
Before using tvorog for making culinary dishes, it is usually rubbed or passed through a meat grinder. Dishes containing tvorog are cooked boiled, baked, fried. Tvorog is often served with sour cream, fermented baked milk, fruits, berries, honey or sweet sauce.

- Pierogi
- Syrniki
- Vatrushka
- Cheesecake, and its miniature, single-portion baked variation – serniczek (pl. serniczki)
- Vareniki
- Easter Paskha
- Cottage cheese casserole
- Syrok curd snack, often glazed with chocolate)
- Kurut (dry cottage cheese in Uzbekistan, Kyrgyzstan, Kazakhstan)
- Pasta with strawberries (Poland)
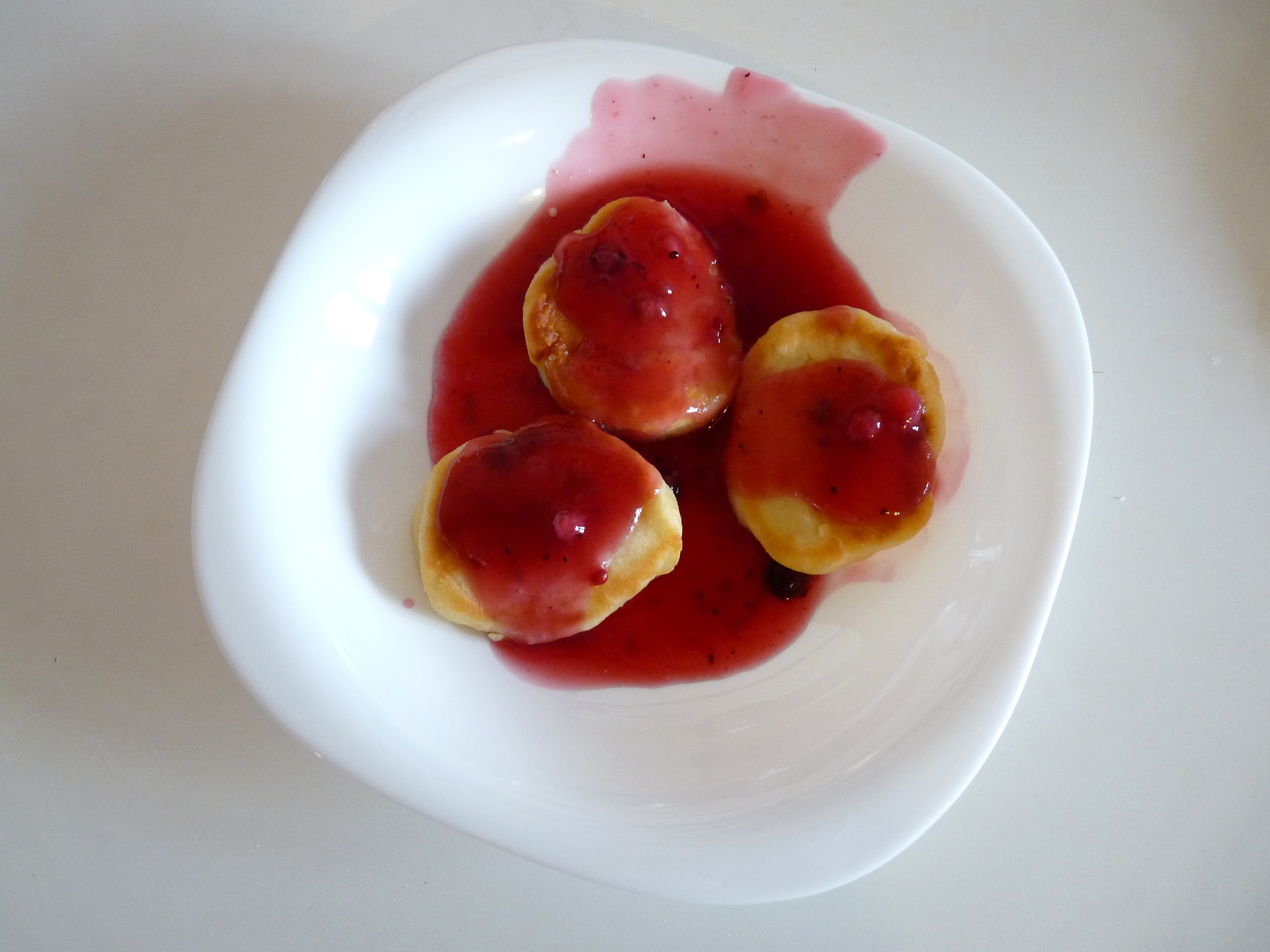
Syrniki with forest berries

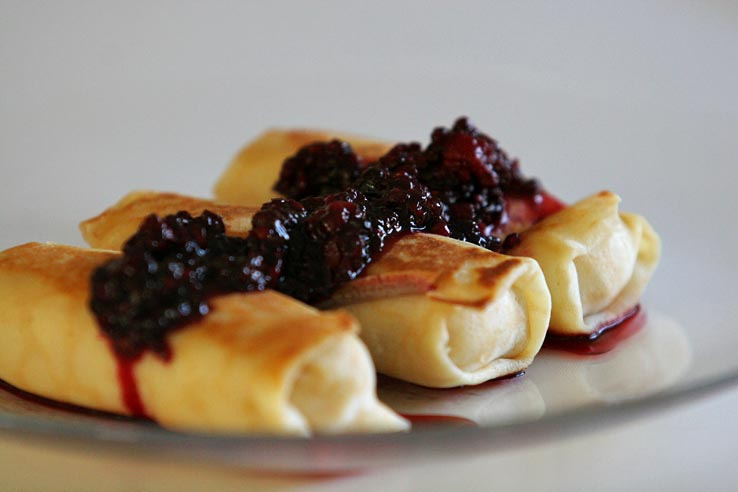
Blintzes / naleśniki Cheese blintzes with blackberries

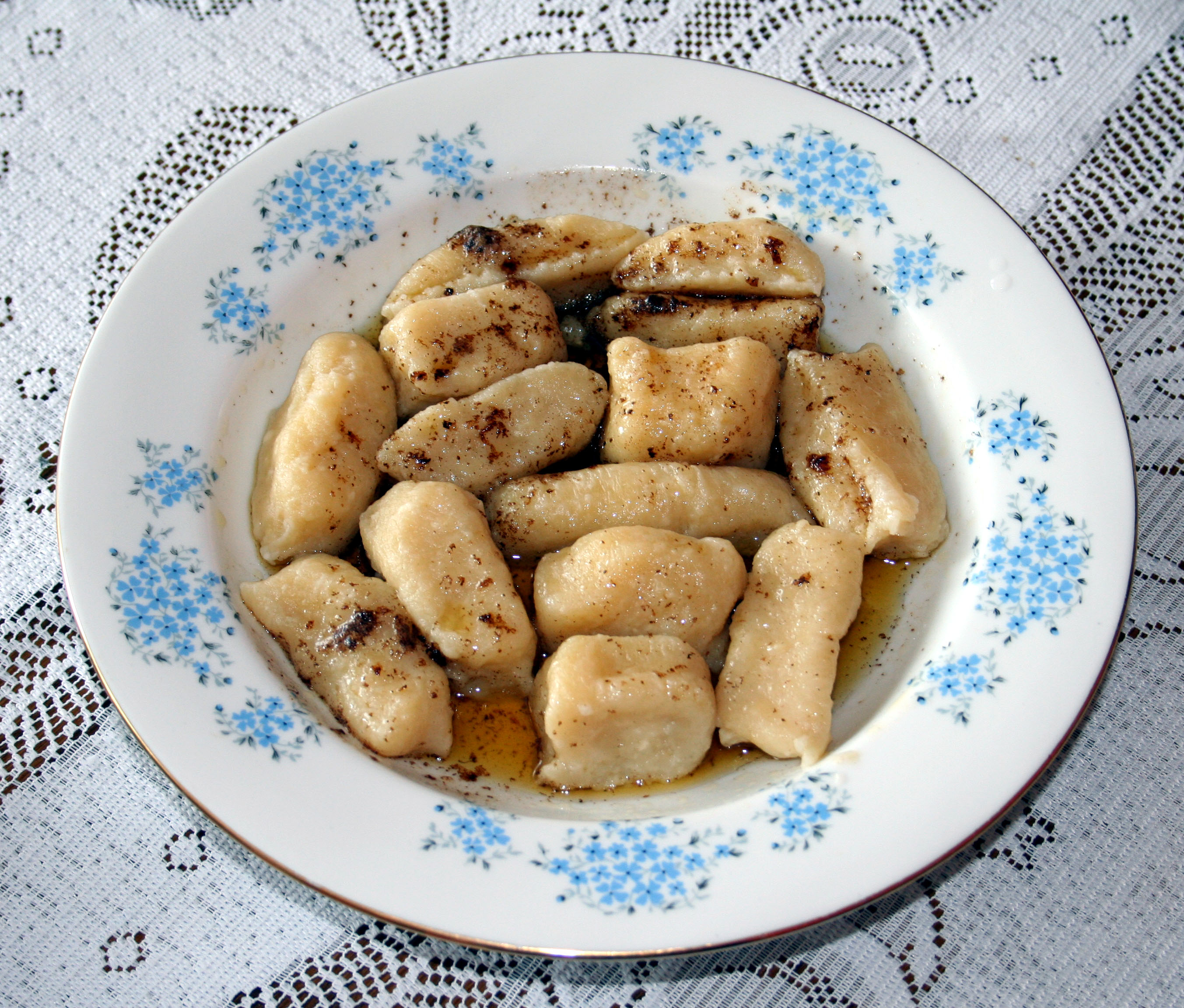
Lazy vareniki / lazy pierogi

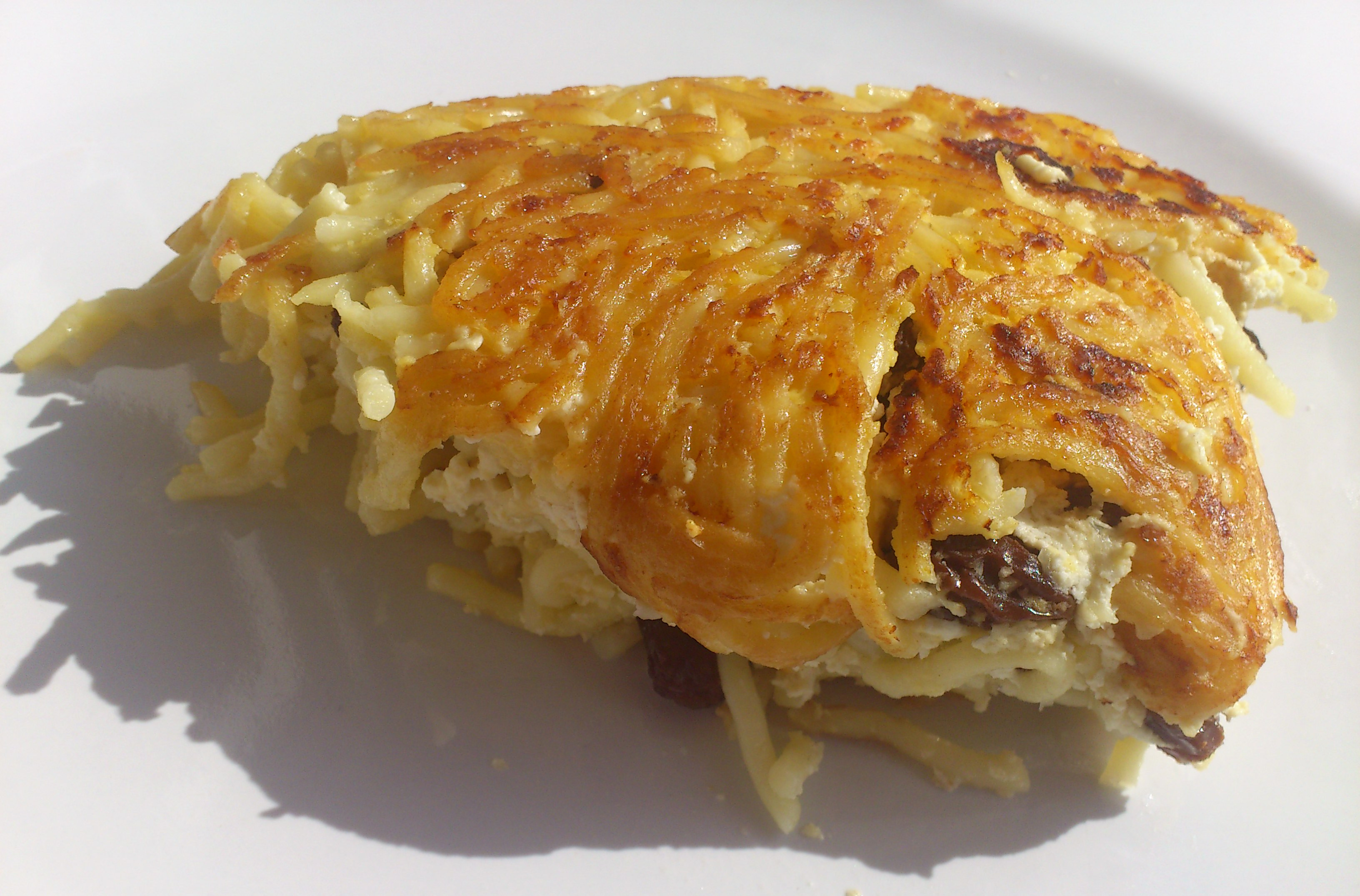
Noodle kugel made with curd cheese, eggs and raisins

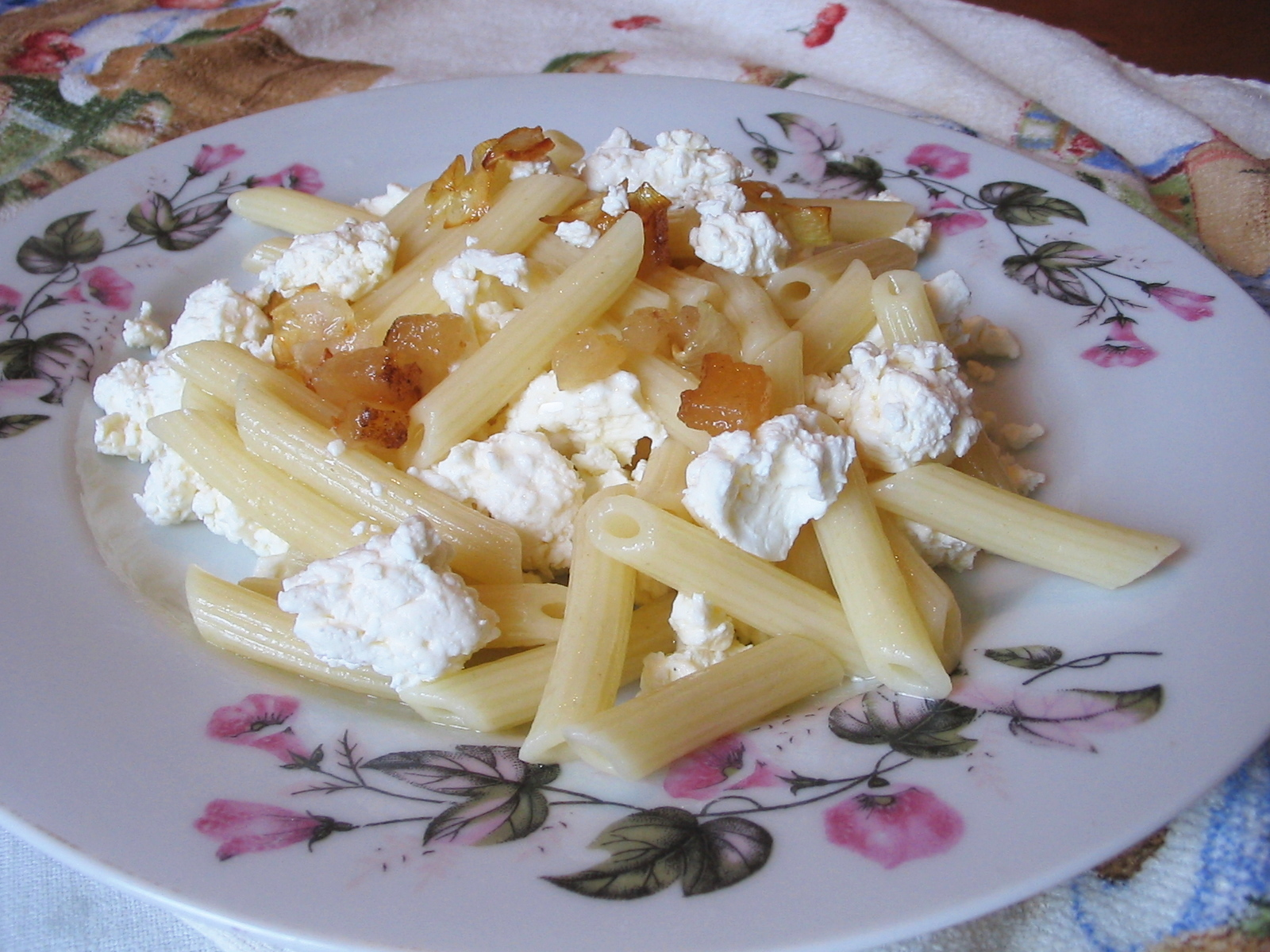
Túrós csusza

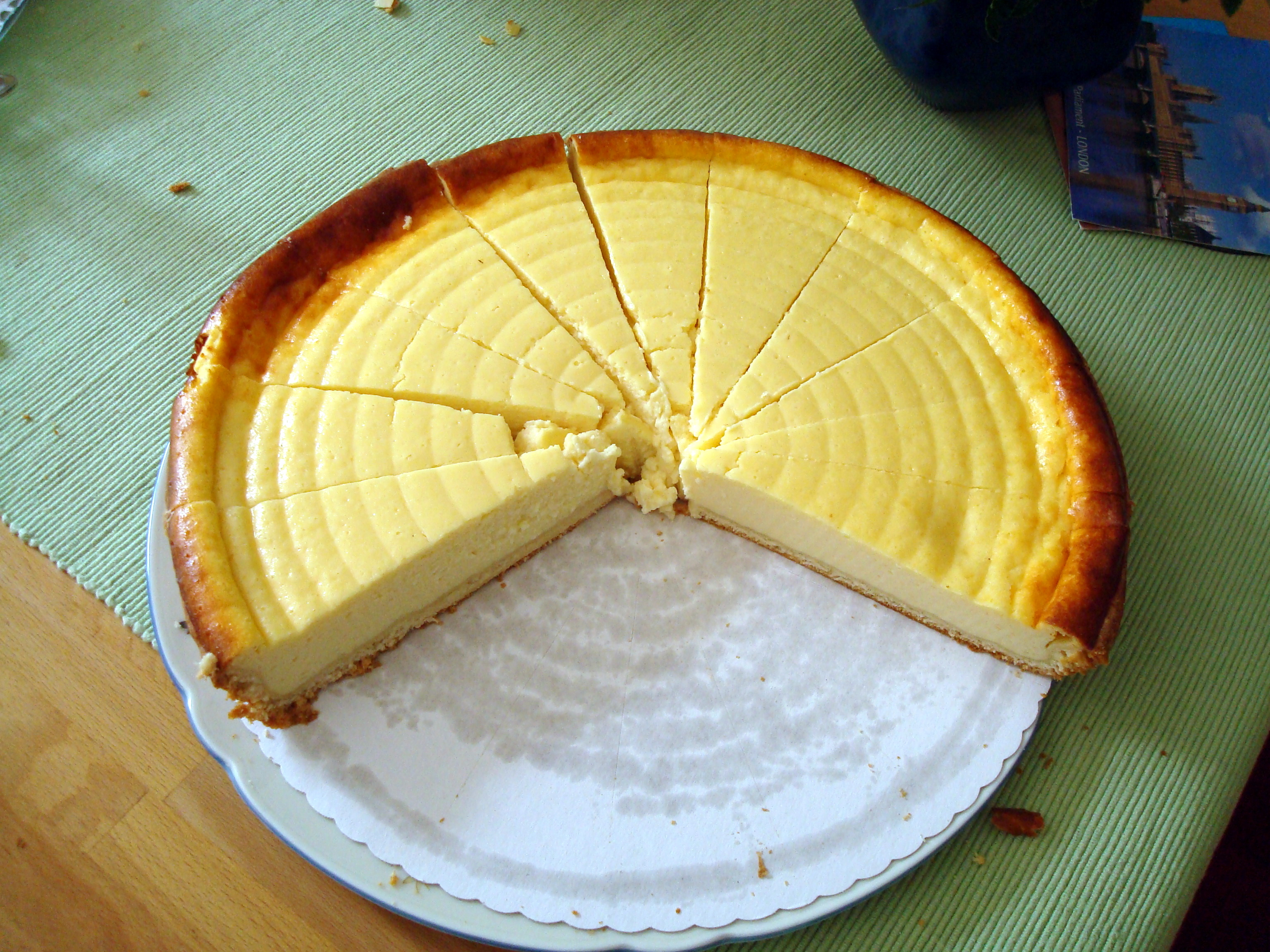
Cheesecake

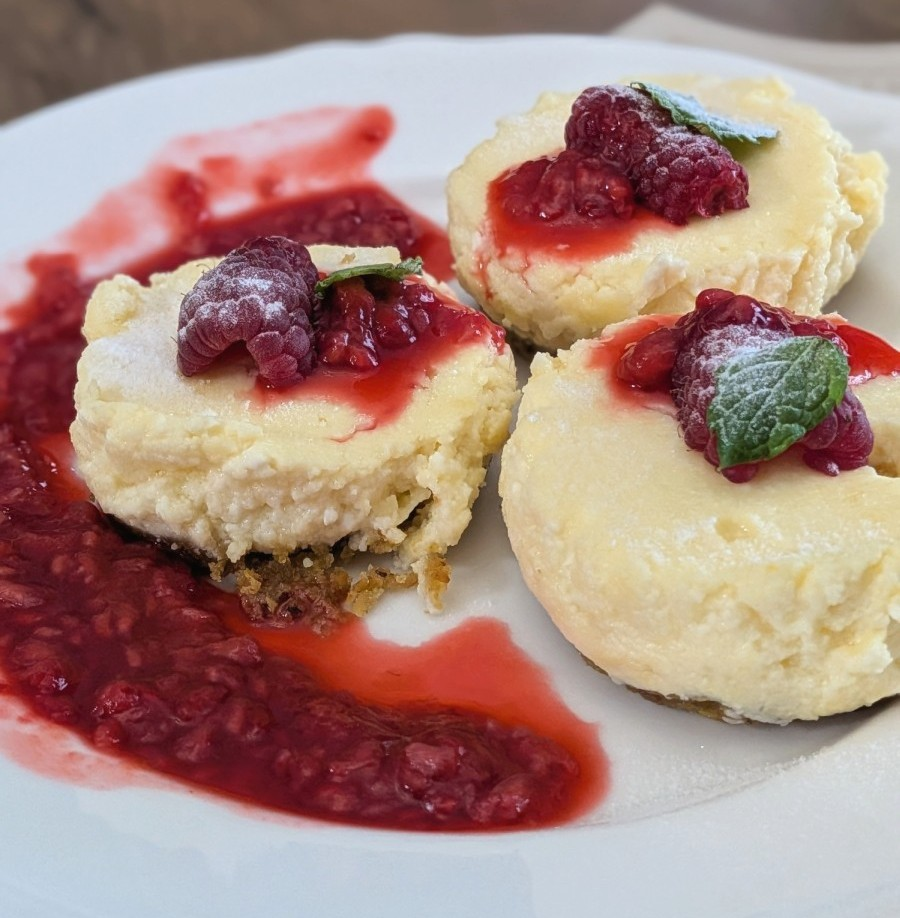
Serniczki with raspberries and mint on a pistachio base

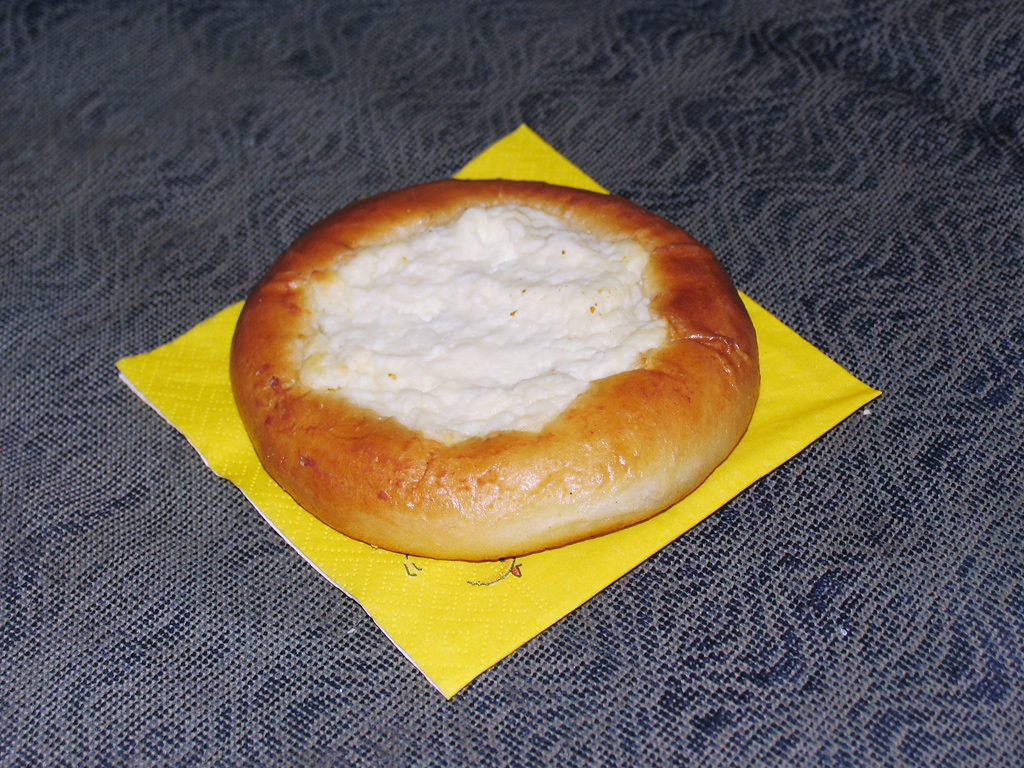
Vatrushka

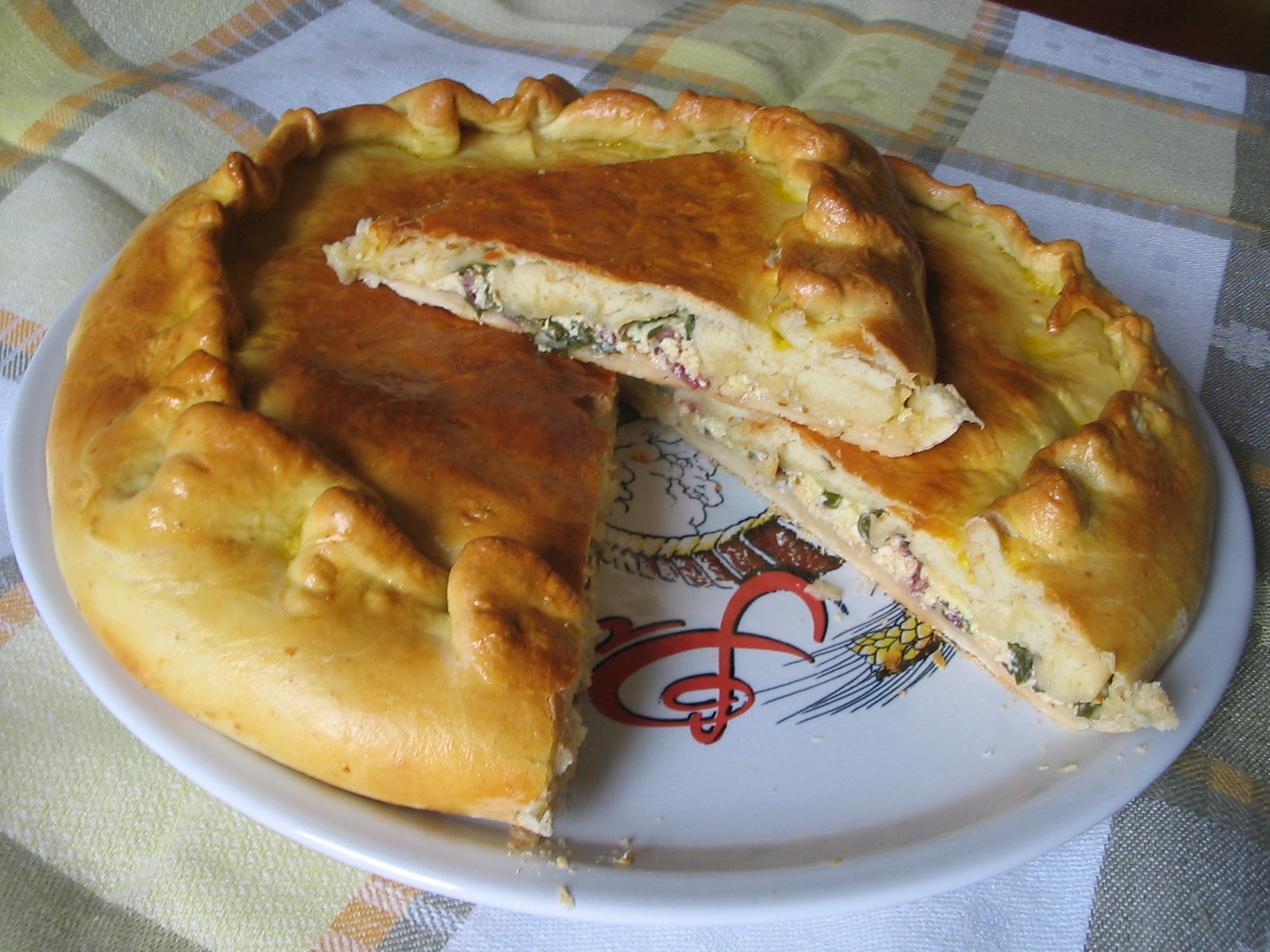
Pirog Pie filled with red beet greens and curd cheese (quark / tvorog)

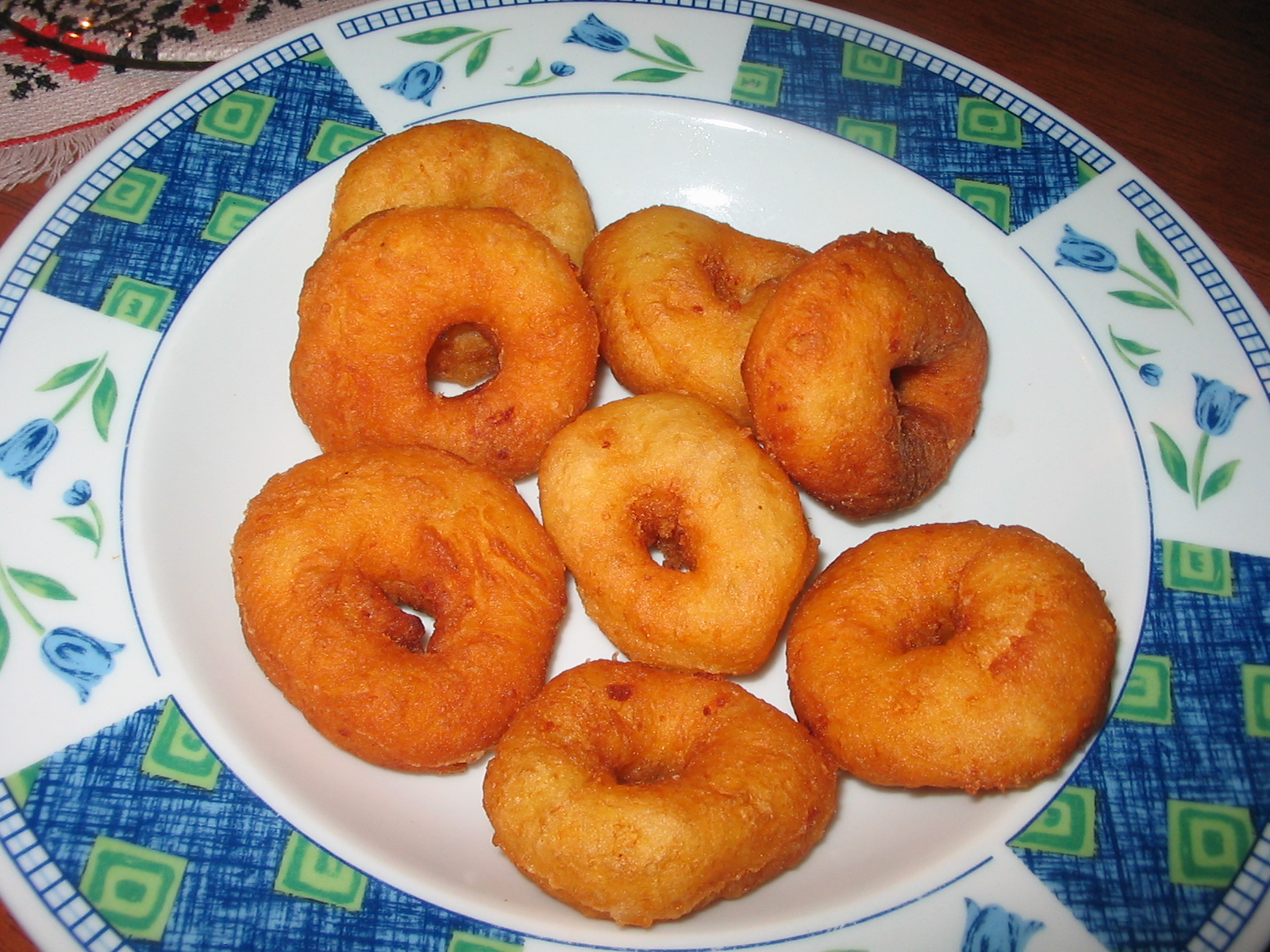
Cheese curd rings

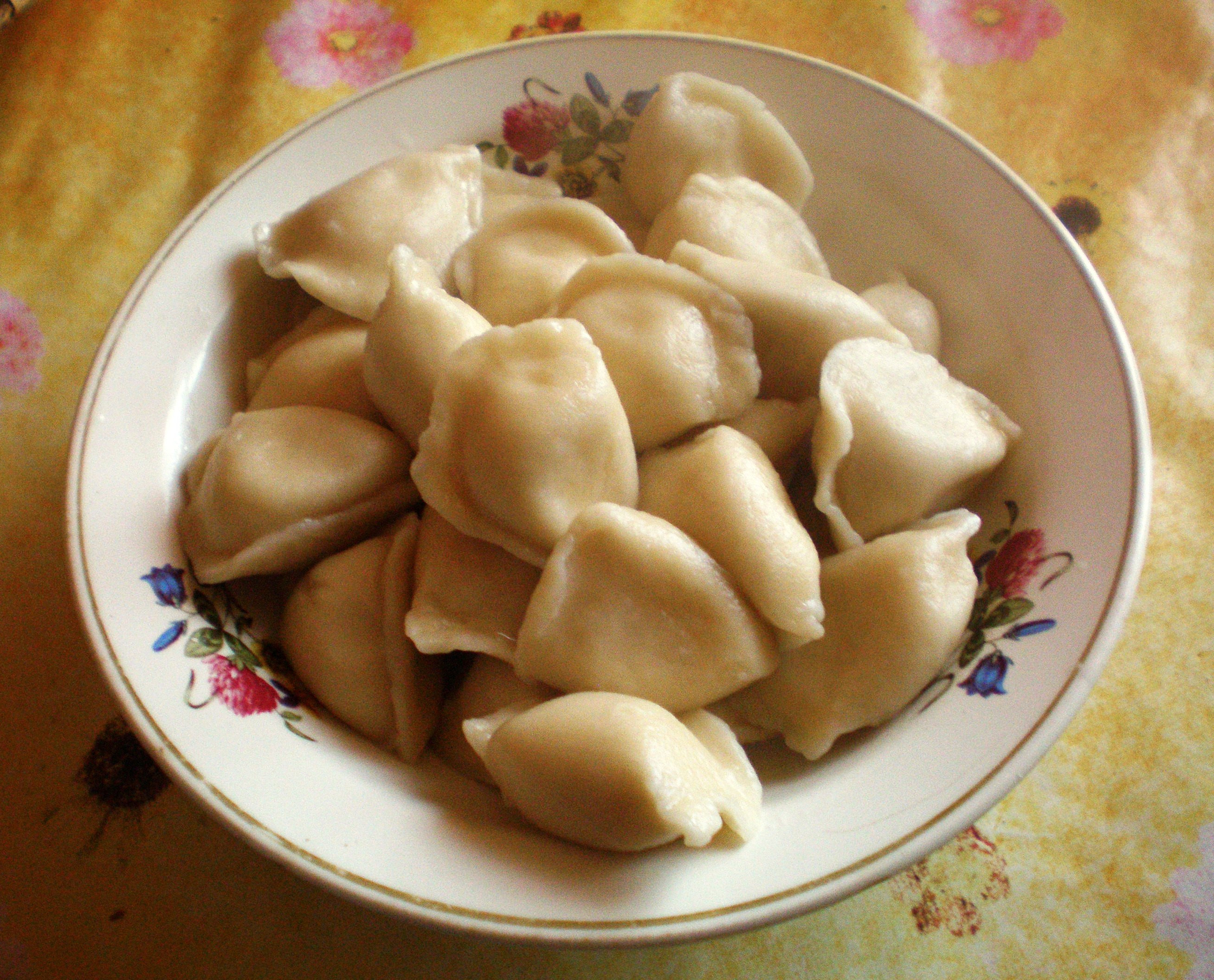
Vareniki

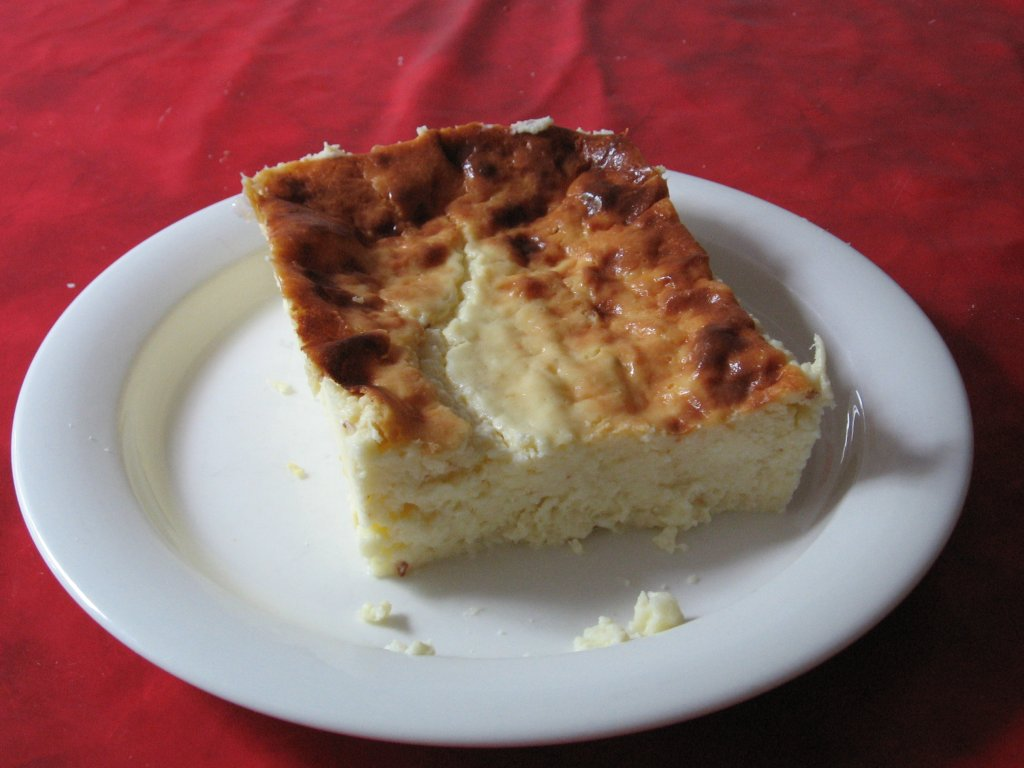
Cottage cheese casserole

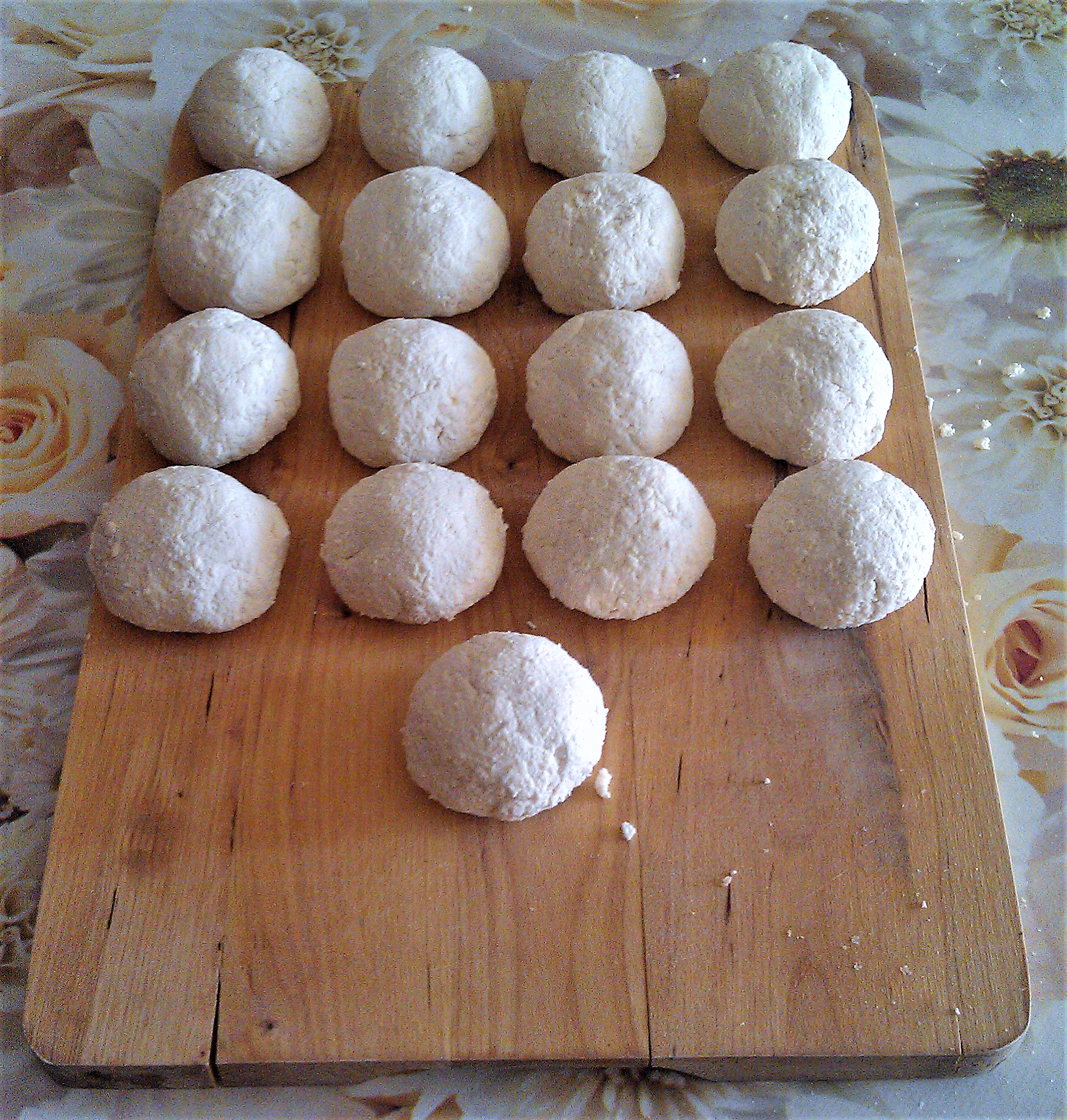
Kurut – dry cottage cheese

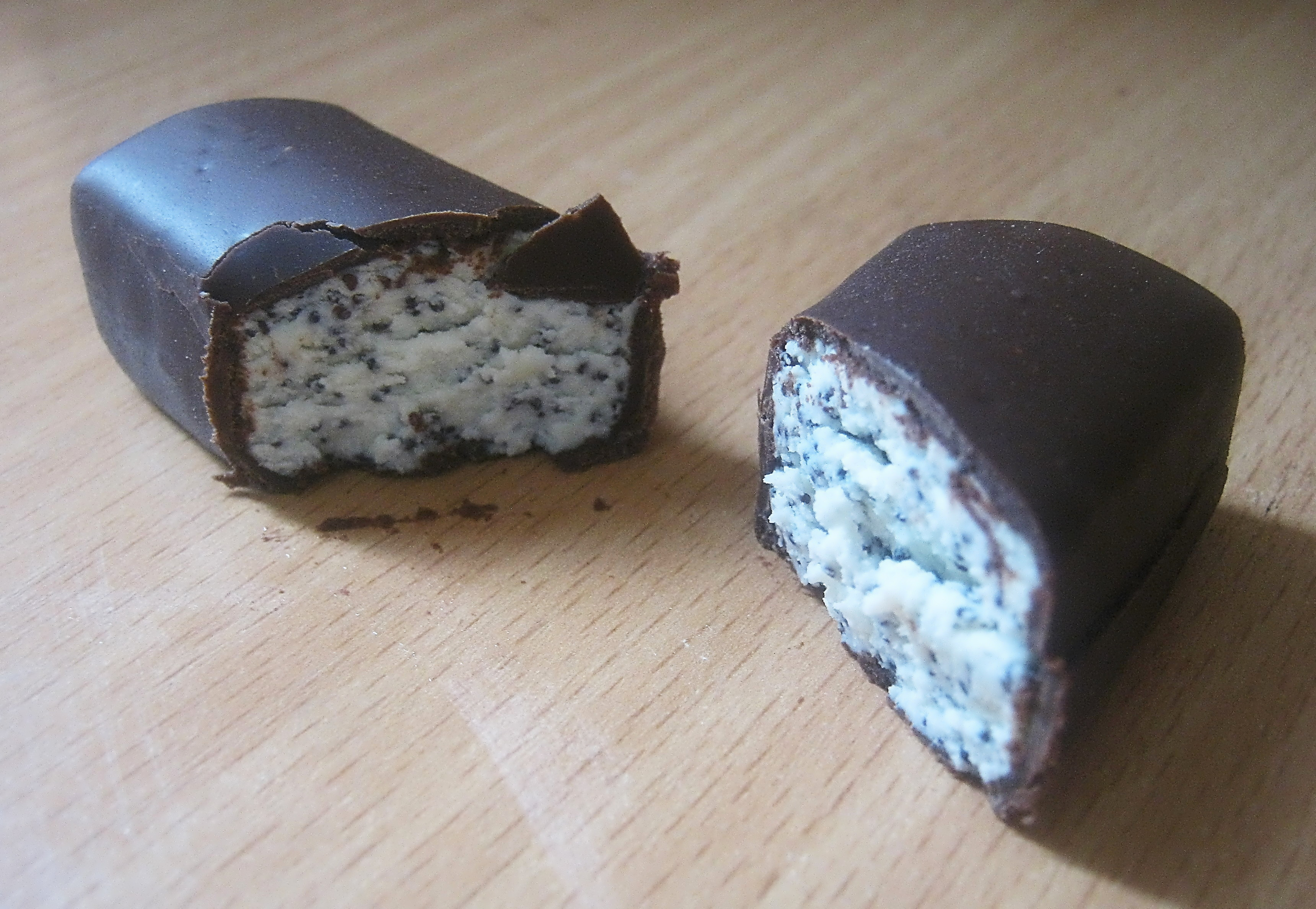
Syrok – cottage cheese with chocolate glazing

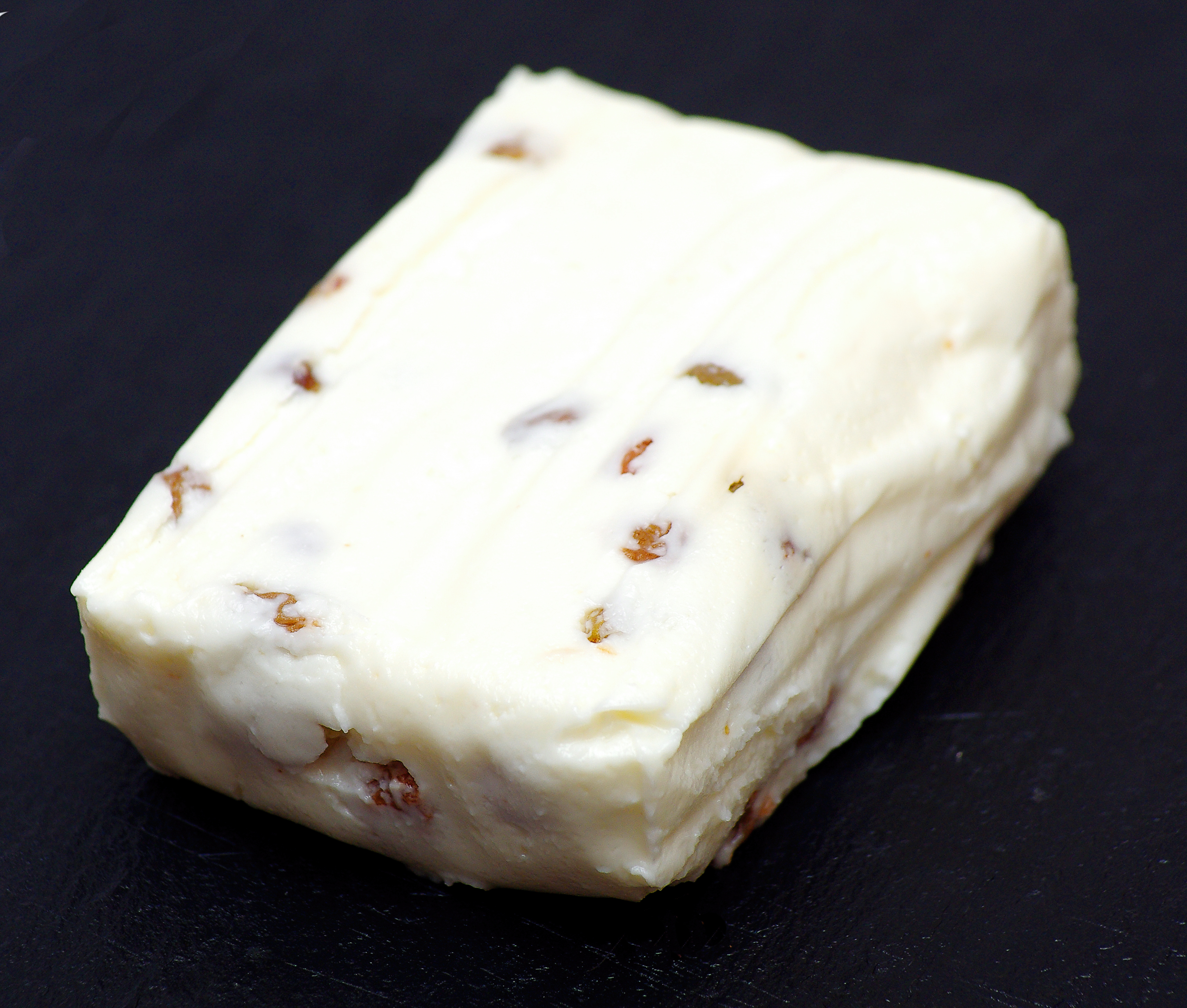
Syrok – unglazed with raisins

== Use in clinical nutrition ==
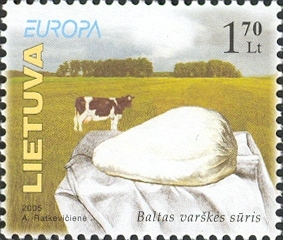
Lithuanian postage stamp dedicated to traditional white cheese, made of pressed tvorog

Tvorog is one of the richest sources of complete protein. Due to denaturation, milk protein becomes more available for cleavage by proteolytic enzymes, so tvorog is easily digested.

Tvorog contains a large amount of calcium in an easily digestible form, as well as vitamins B_{1}, B_{2}, PP, C and others. Promotes the formation of hemoglobin, improves the regenerative capacity of the nervous system, strengthens bone and cartilage tissue.

It has a pronounced diuretic effect.

It has been experimentally established that several times less gastric juice, hydrochloric acid and enzymes are released on tvorog than on fermented and whole milk.

In view of the foregoing, tvorog is very widely used in dietary, as well as children's and sports nutrition, as well as in diets in the treatment of obesity, heart disease, liver disease, atherosclerosis and hypertension, as it has a lipotropic property (improves fat metabolism).

== Use in religious rituals ==
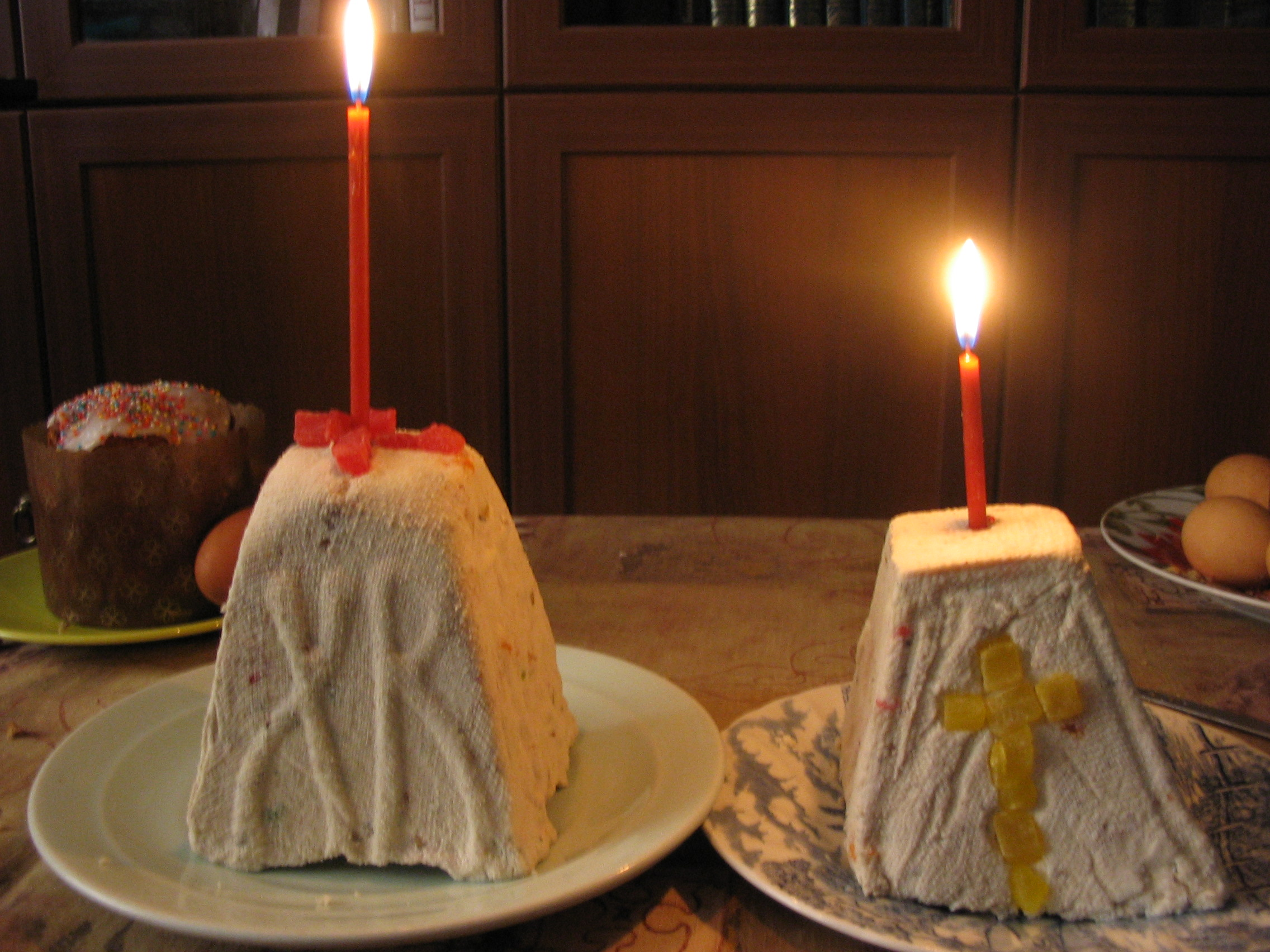
Easter and Paskha

Christian church of the first centuries

In a number of Christian churches of the first centuries there were ritual prohibitions on the use of tvorog in the summer.

In the "Apostolic Tradition" – the manual of the first Christians – there are ritual formulas with a play on words, pronounced during the consecration of Творог: "Sanctify this milk that has curdled, and sanctify us, binding with your love."

Russian Orthodox Church

In the central and northern regions of Russia, there is a custom to prepare a special dish of tvorog for Easter - Paskha, which is consecrated in the church.

== See also ==
- List of Russian dishes
- List of fermented foods
- List of cheeses

== Literature ==
- Cottage cheese // Commodity Dictionary / I. A. Pugachev (editor-in-chief). - M . : State publishing house of trade literature, 1960. - T. VIII. - Stb. 671–673. — 630 p
