= Paska (bread) =

Easter bread native to Russia, Slovakia and Ukraine

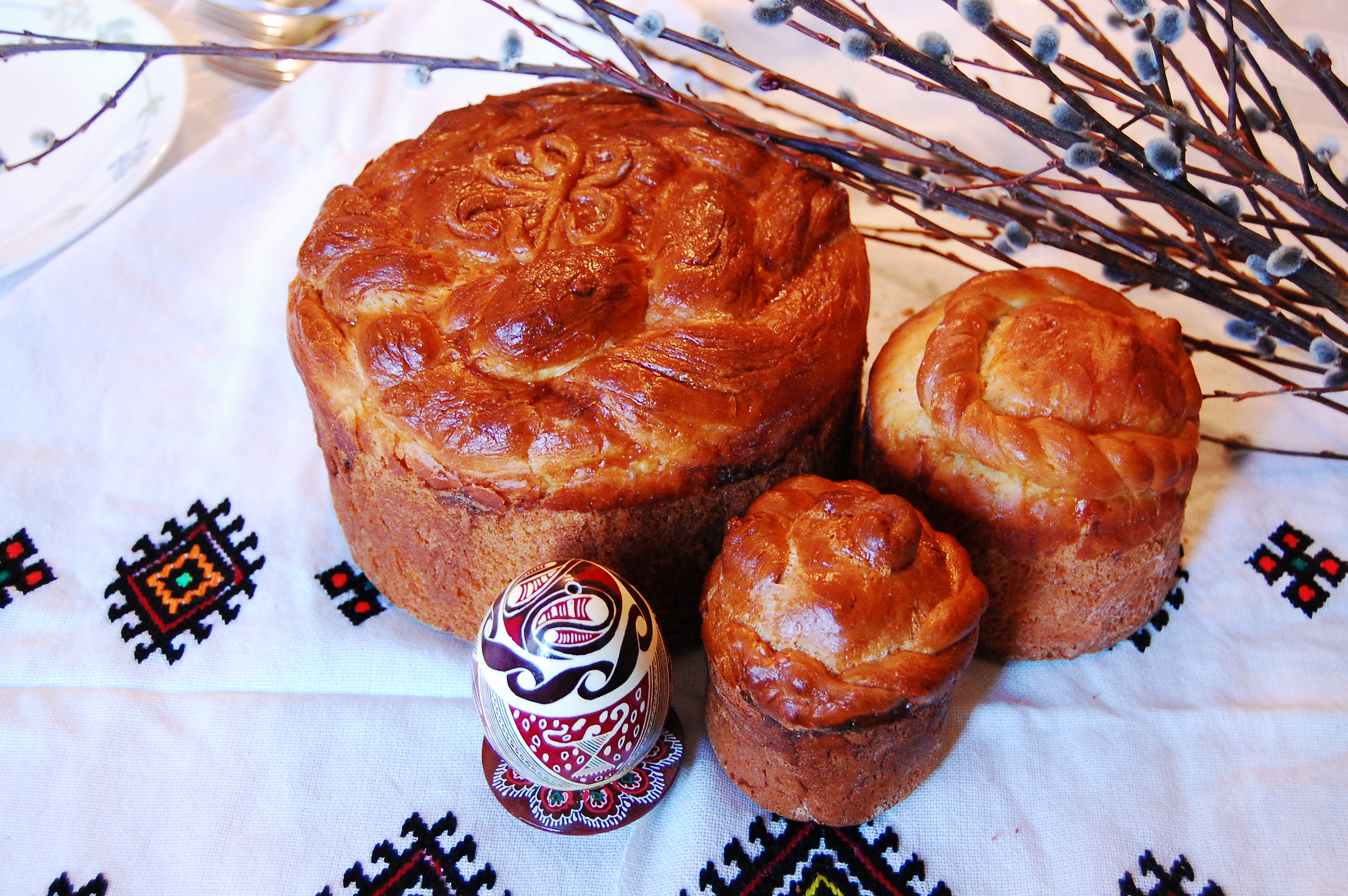
- Traditional Ukrainian paska bread with a pysanka and willow switches
- Type: Sweet bread
- Place of origin: Ukraine
- Main ingredients: Milk, butter, eggs, sugar

Paska (Ukrainian: паска, romanized: paska, IPA: [ˈpɑskɐ]; Georgian: პასკა, romanized: paska, IPA: [ˈpʼaskʼa]; Romanian: pască; lit. 'Easter'; ultimately from Imperial Aramaic: פסחא, romanized: pasḥā, lit. 'Passover') is a traditional Ukrainian Easter bread particularly spread in Central and Eastern European countries with cultural connections to the ancient Byzantine Empire, Eastern Orthodoxy or Eastern Catholicism. Easter breads are a traditional element in the Easter holiday cuisines of Armenia, Belarus, Bulgaria, Croatia, Georgia, Moldova, Romania, Russia, Poland, Slovakia and Ukraine. It is also eaten in countries with large immigrant populations from Central and Eastern Europe such as the United States, Canada and the United Kingdom. Easter bread is also a common tradition amongst the Assyrian diaspora.

== Etymology and origins ==
In the Ukrainian language Easter is called Великдень (Velýkden'). The term paska comes from the Greek word of Easter from which it has also entered Russian as пасха (páskha).

The Ukrainian word паска (páska) is one of the words used for a traditional egg enriched Easter bread or cake in Ukraine, whilst Вели́кдень (Velýkden') is used to denote the day.

In some diaspora communities the term paska is used for braided loaves, while the tall breads resembling Russian kulich are called baba or babka. Among different communities and families it may be used variously for the braided, elaborately decorated loaves of Easter bread, or the tall Easter cake cooked in tin cylinders sometimes called babka, baba or in Russian, kulich.

== Christian symbolism ==
In the Mennonite communities of North America, the act of baking the paska bread was a ritual that commemorated the resurrection of Christ.

The Christian faithful in many Eastern Christian countries eat this bread during Easter. Christian symbolism is associated with features of paska type breads. Other versions include chocolate, rice, or even savoury mixtures based on cheese. A version is made with maraschino cherries added to symbolize royal jewels in honor of the resurrection of Jesus.

== Traditional ingredients ==
Paska bread

Paska is made with milk, butter, eggs, flour, and sugar, except for the Romanian pască where the recipe most commonly includes sweet cream, cottage cheese, and/or sour cream along with eggs, sugar, raisins, and rum. An egg and water mixture is used as a glaze.

== Ukraine ==
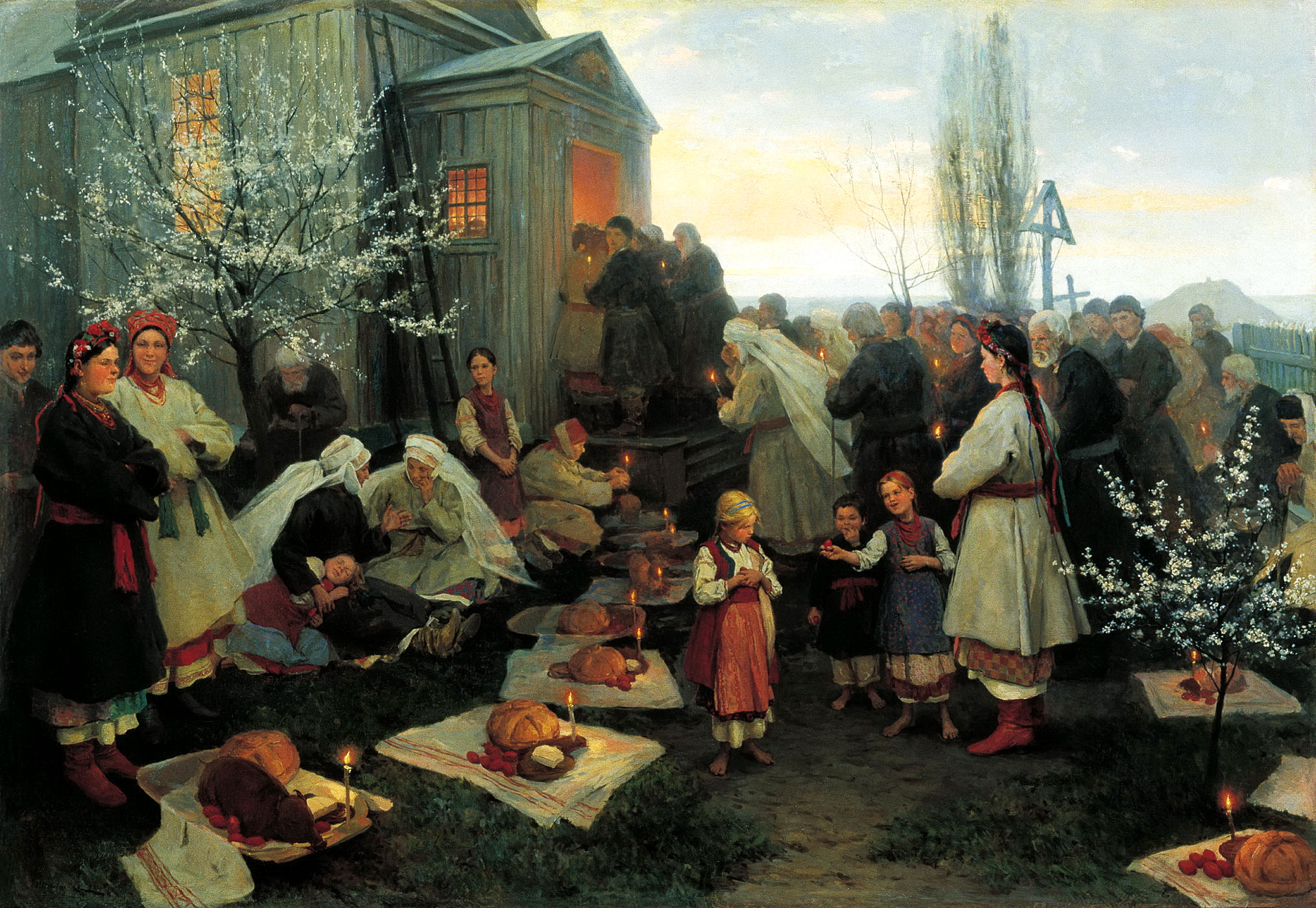
Traditional Ukrainian Easter, Painting by Mykola Pymonenko

The earliest preserved recipe of Ukrainian paska stems from a mid-18th century collection of recipes gathered by Lubny colonel Ivan Kuliabka. It included numerous spices, such as saffron, cinnamon and ginger.

In Ukraine, it is tradition to fill one's Easter basket (koshyk) with Easter eggs (pysanky), Easter bread (paska), sausage (kovbasa), butter, salt and other ceremonial foods on Holy Saturday (Easter Eve). On Easter morning, after the liturgy and the blessing of the paska and other staples, people return home to feast on the eggs, cold meats, and other goods that were blessed at church. After the matins all the people in the congregation exchange Easter greetings, give each other krashanky, and then return home with baskets of blessed food (sviachene). In the east of Ukraine people return home, place the sviachene on the table, and the oldest member of the family opens the cloths in which the food is wrapped, slices pieces from each item, and distributes them to members of the family along with a piece of unleavened bread that has also been blessed.

In the west of Ukraine, especially in the Hutsul region, people first walk around their house three times. Only then do they enter the house, ceremoniously open the bundle (dorinnyk) over the heads of the children, and sit down to the table to break their fast.

Modern pasky usually have a white glaze made from sugar and egg and are decorated on top with coloured wheat grains or poppy seeds. However, an old custom, which is still practiced in some Ukrainian regions and diasporas, is to create dough ornaments for the paska. The symbolism of these ornaments is connected with spring themes: the awakening of nature, resurrection and rebirth. Birds, especially larks, were seen as heralds of spring and were also used to decorate pasky.

== Eaten with other foods ==
Paska is eaten with hrudka, also called syrek, a bland sweet custard similar to cheese made from separated eggs and milk; beets mixed with horseradish(chren/hrin), and kovbasa.

== Pască ==
Pască
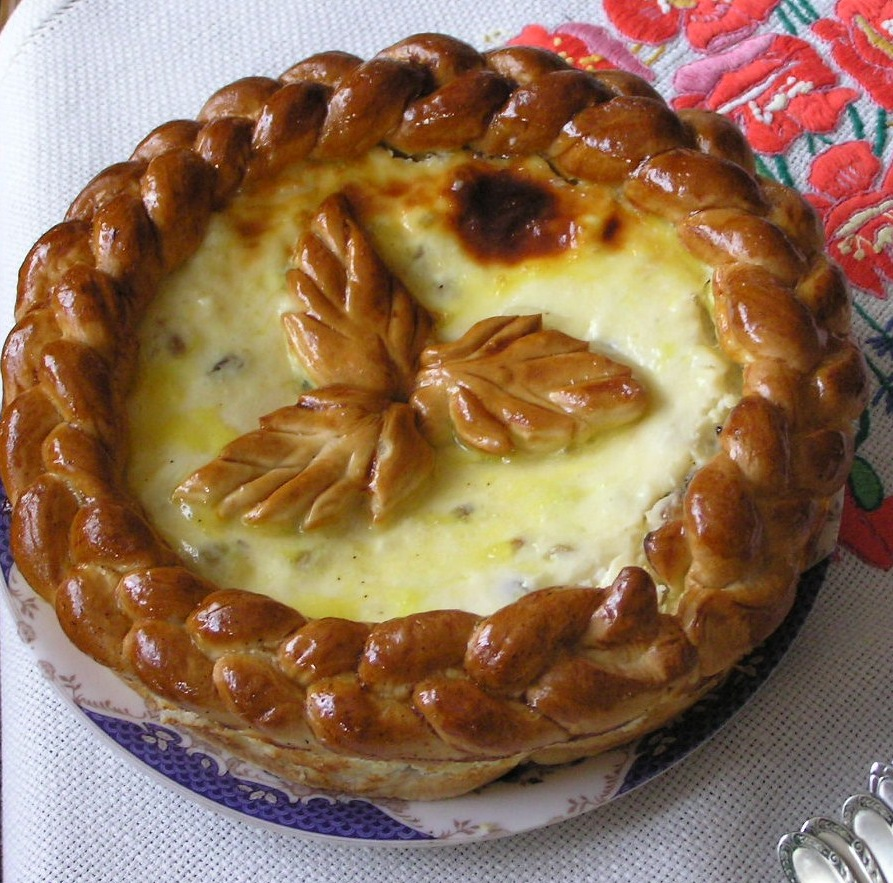
- Pască with cheese
- Type: Pastry
- Place of origin: Romania, Moldova
- Main ingredients: eggs, sour cream, fresh cheese, raisins, sugar

Pască is a traditional Romanian and Moldovan pastry. Especially made for Easter, pască is a tart with a cozonac dough base filled with fresh cheese like urdă or cottage cheese, raisins, eggs and sugar. Other variants include sour cream, chocolate, or berries fillings.

== See also ==
- Babka
- Cozonac or Kozunak is the Romanian and Bulgarian name for a type of Easter bread
- Kolach (bread)
- Kulich (bread), Russian Easter bread
- List of sweet breads
