= Easter bread =

Bread traditionally eaten around Easter

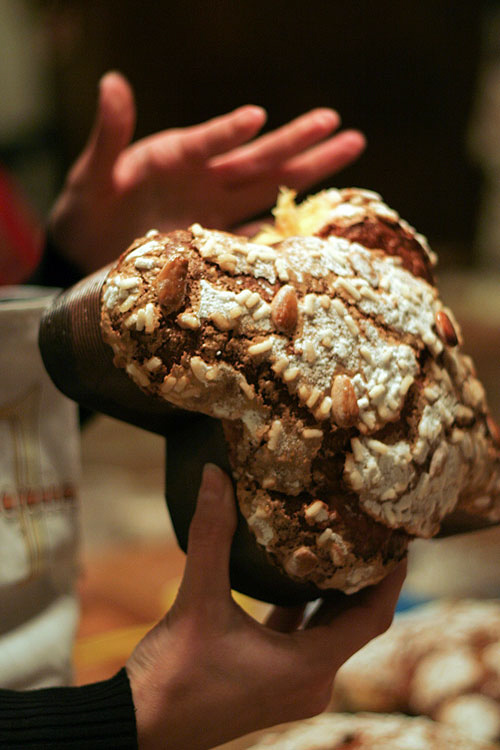
- Italian Easter bread, the colomba pasquale. It is the Easter counterpart of the two well-known Italian Christmas desserts, panettone and pandoro.
- Type: Bread

In many European countries, particularly in Central and Eastern Europe, there are various traditions surrounding the use of bread during the Easter holidays. Traditionally the practice of eating Easter bread or sweetened communion bread traces its origin back to Byzantium, Eastern Catholicism and the Orthodox Christian church. The recipe for sweetened or "honey-leavened" bread may date back as far as the Homeric Greek period based on anecdotal evidence from classical texts.

== Central and Eastern Europe ==
=== Kozunak, Kulich, Paska and Mazanec ===
Kozunak is the traditional Easter bread in Bulgaria, Moldova and North Macedonia. kulich is one of different traditional Russian Easter breads. Kolach is the traditional Easter bread in Albania, Belarus, Hungary and Slovakia. The traditional Easter bread in the Czech Republic is called Mazanec. The traditional Easter bread in Serbia is known as Uskršnja Pogača. Ukrainian Easter bread is known as Paska (not to be confused with a different dish, known as paskha) where often a rich, white bread is served and decorated on the top with symbols, including crosses, flowers, braids, wheat, or other designs representing aspects of Orthodox and Eastern Catholic faith.

Romania and Moldova also have a traditional Easter pastry called Pască (the term Pasca is "Easter" in the Eastern Orthodox faith, similar to Pâques in French. It is derived from the Hebrew pesah). The Romanian Pască is made with cheese (and may also include fruits, nuts, or chocolate for decoration). It is usually found alongside another traditional sweet bread which Romanians make for Easter and Christmas called Cozonac.

=== Pinca and Poprtnik ===
Pinca is a variety of Easter bread popular in Austria, Croatia, Montenegro and Slovenia. Poprtnik is a variety native to Slovenia. It is decorated with intricate floral designs and may also incorporate various symbols associated with Easter.

=== Syrnyk ===
Syrnyk is a quickbread with cheese (similar to a cheesecake) that in Ukrainian Orthodox culture is often included in Easter food baskets which are taken to church to be blessed on Easter along with ham, sausages, relishes, chocolate, cheeses and other foods that were forbidden during Great Lent. The quickbread dough is made with eggs and butter, cottage cheese, cream cheese, honey, walnuts, almonds, candied orange peel, cream and cinnamon.

=== Babka and Placek ===
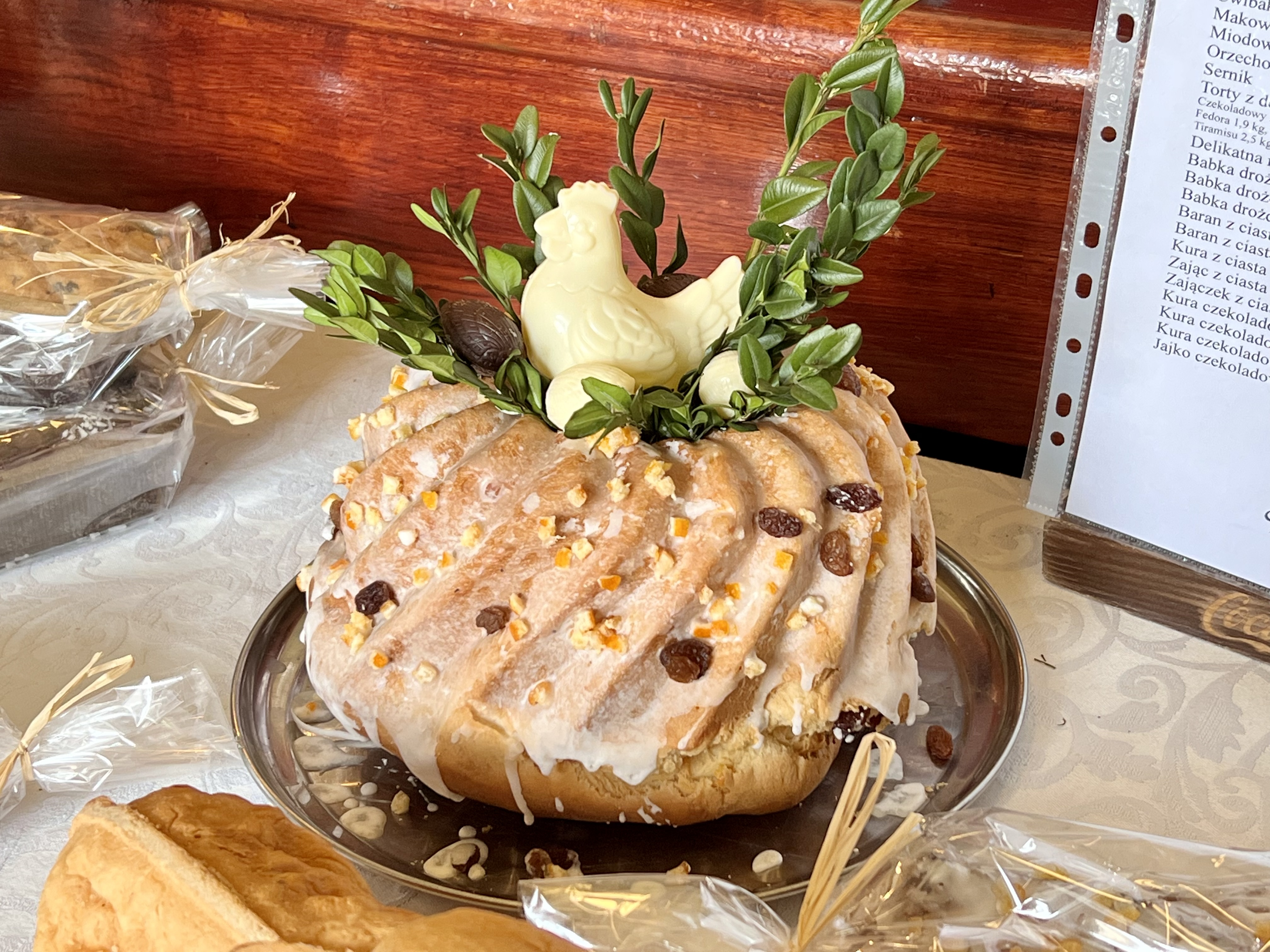
Yeast baba cake decorated with icing, raisins and Easter accents

Baba or babka is a Polish cake made for Easter Sunday, but it is not to be confused with the Polish-Jewish babka bread. A traditional babka is tall and cylindrical, often baked in bundt-type pan. It frequently contains raisins, succade, or orangeat, and may be iced on top. It is also made in the western parts of Belarus and Ukraine and is much sweeter than a paska. Placek is another traditional Easter bread in Poland.

== Germany ==
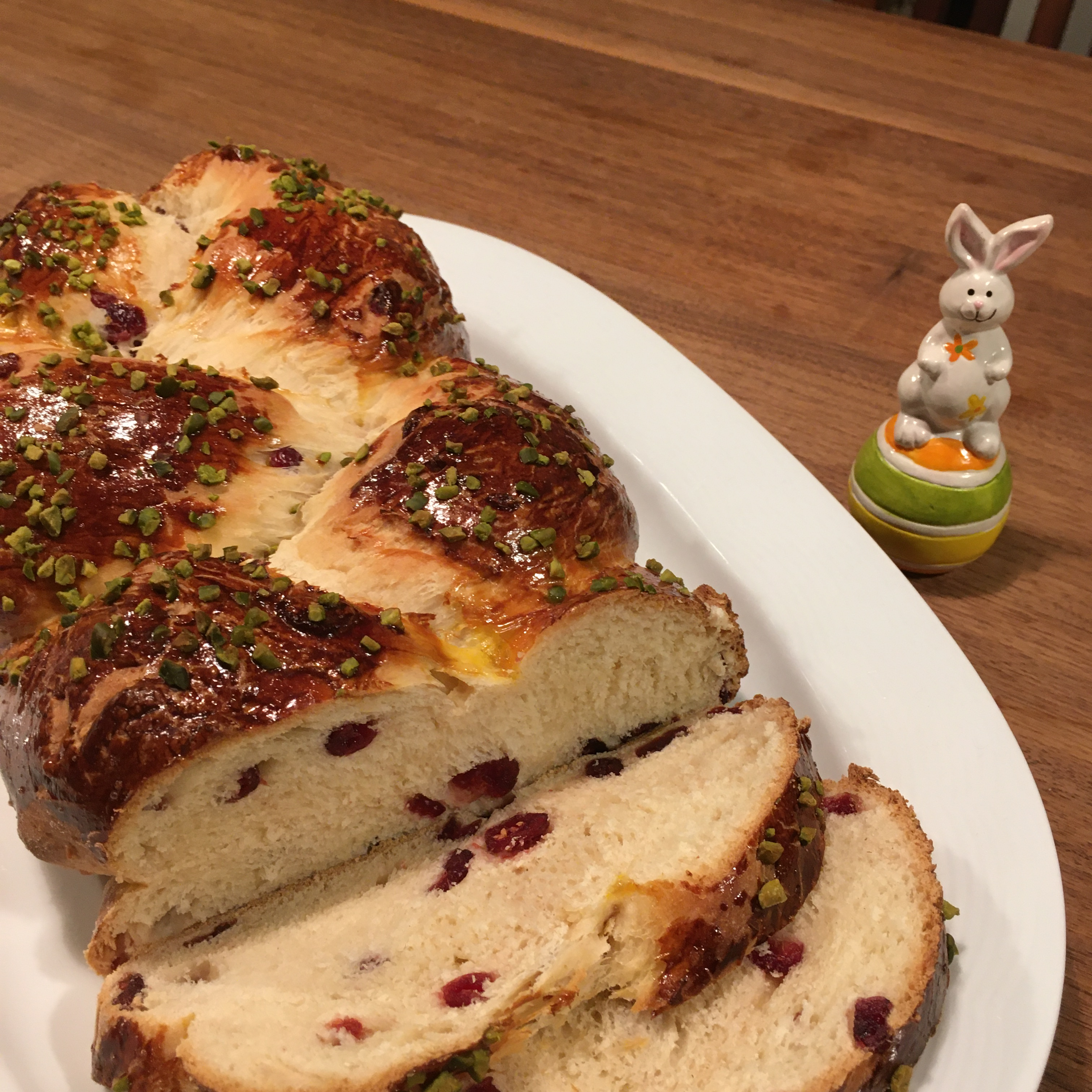
German Osterzopf with cranberries and pistachios

During the weeks before Easter, special Easter bread is sold (in German: Osterbrot,). This is made with yeast dough, raisins, and almond splinters. Usually, it is cut in slices and spread with butter. People enjoy it either for breakfast or for tea time (in German: Kaffee und Kuchen, lit. 'coffee and cake').

== Netherlands ==
The Dutch Easter bread is the so-called 'stol', a fruit bread with raisins and usually filled with almond paste. It is the same type of bread also eaten as a Christmas bread.

== Italy ==
=== Casatiello ===
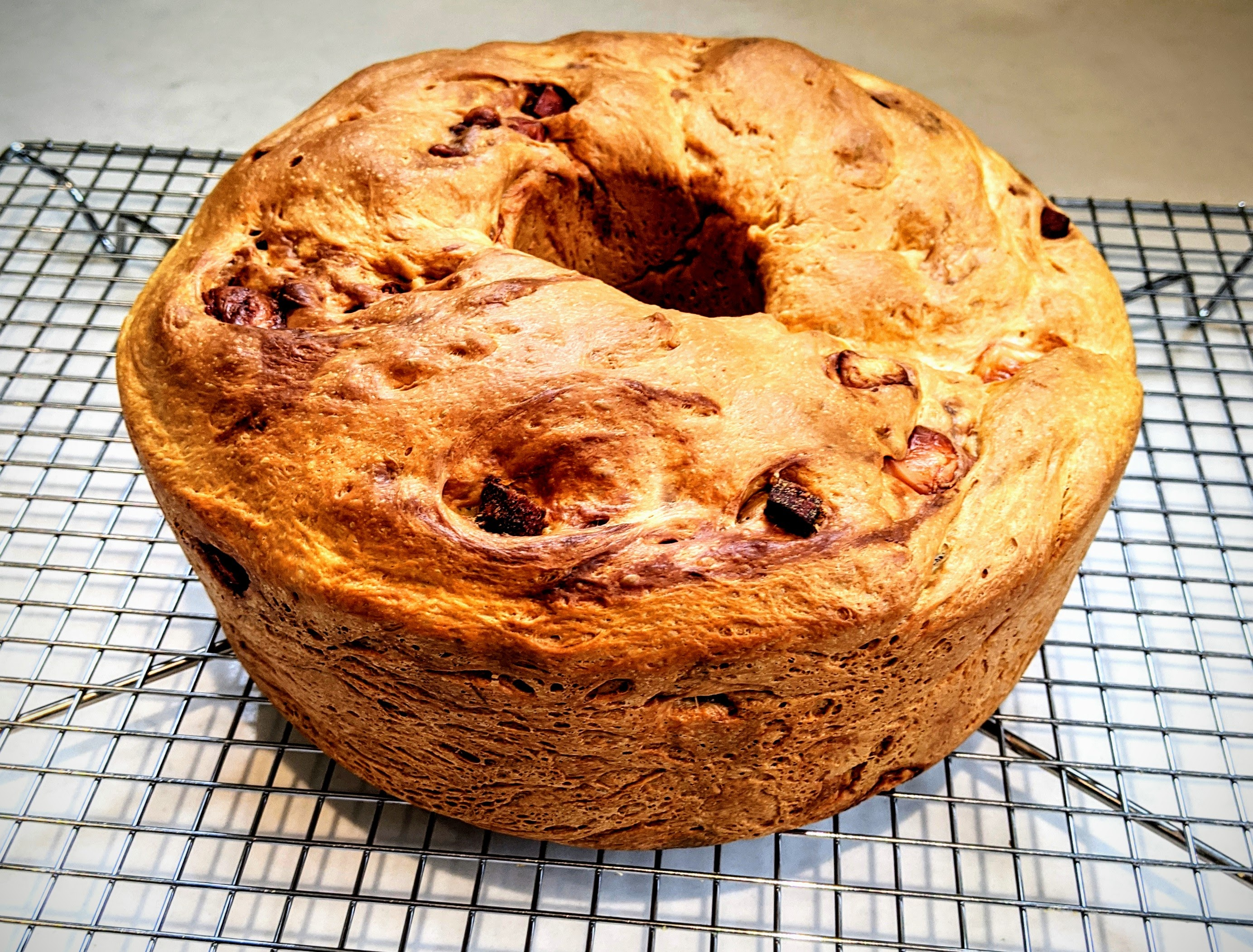
Italian casatiello

Casatiello (Neapolitan: casatiéllo; Italian: casatello) is a leavened savory bread originating from Naples prepared during the Easter period. Its basic ingredients are flour, lard, cheese, salami, cracklings, eggs and black pepper. The bread's name derives probably from the Neapolitan word caso (Italian: cacio, 'cheese', hence casatiello), an ingredient that is part of its dough.

=== Colomba pasquale ===
Colomba pasquale or colomba di Pasqua (lit. 'Easter dove') is an Italian traditional Easter bread, the Easter counterpart of the two well-known Italian Christmas desserts, panettone and pandoro. The dough for the colomba pasquale is made in a similar manner to panettone, with flour, eggs, sugar, natural yeast and butter; unlike panettone, it usually contains candied peel and no raisins. The dough is then fashioned into a dove (colomba in Italian) shape and finally is topped with pearl sugar and almonds before being baked. Some manufacturers produce other versions including a popular bread topped with chocolate. The colomba pasquale was commercialised by the Milanese baker and businessman Angelo Motta as an Easter version of the Christmas speciality panettone that Motta foods were producing.

=== Pastiera ===
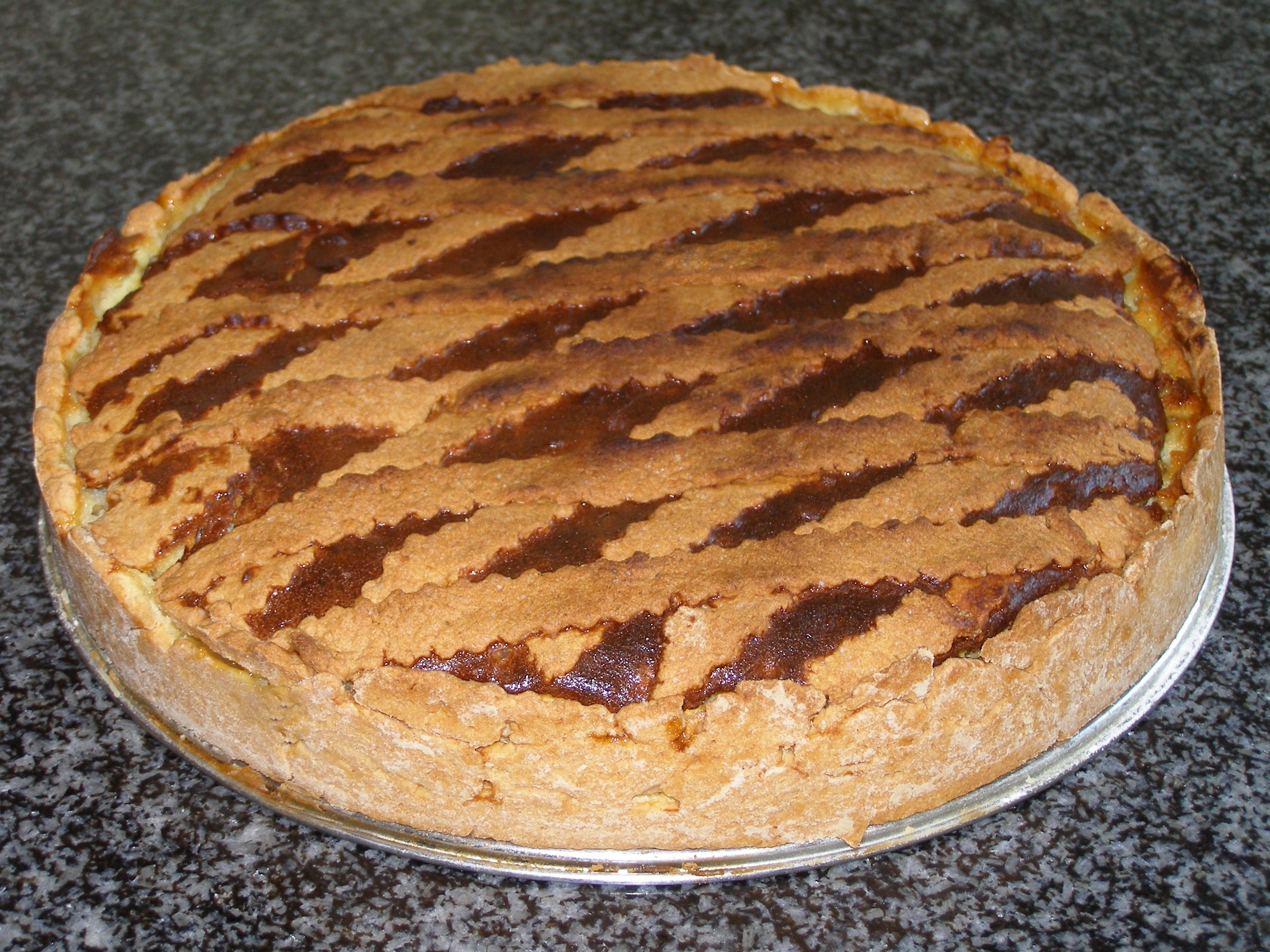
Italian pastiera

Pastiera is a type of Neapolitan tart made with cooked wheat, eggs, ricotta, and flavored with orange flower water. It is usually eaten at Easter. Various writers repeat legends about the origin of pastiera. One story connects it to the siren Parthenope, whom the Neapolitans thanked for her sweet singing by giving her ricotta, flour, eggs, milk, spices, and sugar; Parthenope gave these ingredients to the gods, who made pastiera out of it. Another story connects it to a spring celebration of the goddess Ceres.

=== Penia ===
Penia is a sweet bread that originated in rural Italy and is made during the Easter holiday. Ingredients include sugar, butter, eggs, anise seeds and lemons.

=== Pizza di Pasqua ===
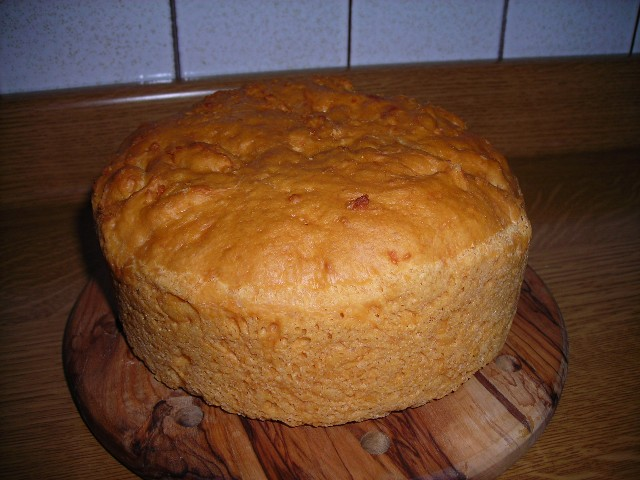
Italian Pizza di Pasqua

The pizza di Pasqua (lit. 'Easter Pizza') is a leavened savory cake typical of some areas central Italy, based on wheat flour, eggs, pecorino and parmesan, traditionally served at breakfast on Easter morning, or as an appetizer during Easter lunch, accompanied by blessed boiled eggs, ciauscolo and red wine or, again, served at the Easter Monday picnic. Having the same shape as panettone, the pizza di pasqua with cheese is a typical product of the Marche region, but also Umbrian (where, as a traditional food product, it obtained the PAT recognition). There is also a sweet variant, with candied fruits or without, sugar and a fiocca, that is a meringue glaze with sugar beads. According to religious tradition, the pizza di pasqua should be prepared on Maundy Thursday or Good Friday to be eaten only at Easter, that is, at the end of the period of fasting and abstinence dictated by lent. Once ready, then, it was customary to bring the pizza di pasqua to the church, so that it would be blessed together with the other foods to be consumed on Easter day.

=== Sardinia ===
In Sardinia, Italy, bread is a part of a wide social context. It is the most important food in Sardinia, as well as all over Italy and the Mediterranean. "Bread is a nexus of economic, political, aesthetic, social, symbolic, and health concerns". Bread is symbolic for life. A peasant proverb mentions, "Chie hat pane mai non morit — one who has bread never dies". The Easter holiday is one where bread brings itself into the symbolic realm. Bread is significant for religious purposes. Luisa Fois described bread in her life after she was married and for the Easter holiday. The bread was made into a cross to represent the crucifixion of Jesus Christ. Since they were married, they needed to eat it together. They would share their lives now, and they must share their "cross" together (their life's burden) as well. "Bread was a product of their union, and its shared consumption reaffirmed their interdependence". From this we gather that bread also displays a message, rather than being an item purely for consumption and nutritional purposes. Two kinds of Easter bread are described in Counihans article. One contained two points, and an egg covered with a cross. "The egg and the points that recall birds in flight speak of fertility, sexuality, and procreation — basic themes in Easter and its pagan precursors". The second bread was designed to have no overall shape, but was rather baked to encircle an egg, with the initials BP put on it. The initials BP stand for buona Pasqua or "happy Easter". "Letters rather than forms express meaning. Letters are symbolic of civilization and ... meaning".

== Types ==
Image	Name	Native name	Cuisine	Reference
	Paska	Паска Paska პასკა	Ukrainian; Belarusian; Slovak; Georgian	
	Kulich	Кулич	Russian	
	Cozonac	Козунак	Bulgarian; Macedonian; Romanian; Moldovan	
	Pasca (cheese-filled)	Pască Паска	Romanian; Moldovan; Ukrainian (Bukovinian)	
	Babka	Baba wielkanocna Бабка	Polish; West Ukrainian (Galician, Hutsuls)	
	Kolach	Колач; Kolač; Fonott kalács	Serbian; Hungarian	
	Pinca	Pinca; Пинца	Croatian; Montenegrin	
	Easter breads	Velikonocni kruhki	Slovenian	
	Tsoureki also called paskalya çöreği	τσουρέκι չորեկ	Greek; Armenian	
	Hot cross bun		British	
	Mazanec	Mazanec	Czech	
	Paasstol	Paasstol	Dutch	
	Colomba pasquale	Colomba pasquale	Italian	
	Pastiera	Pastiera	Italian	
	Pizza di Pasqua	Pizza di Pasqua	Italian	
	Pizza di Pasqua (sweet variant)	Pizza di Pasqua (sweet variant)	Italian	
	Folar	Folar de Páscoa	Portuguese	
	Easter mona	Mona de Pasqua	Valencian; Catalan; Spanish	
	Hornazo	Hornazo	Spanish	
	Easter Bread	Osterbrot	German	

== See also ==
- Easter food
