= Pinza (disambiguation) =

Pinza (1950–1977) was a Thoroughbred racehorse.

Pinza may also refer to:

== Food ==
- Pinza triestina
- Pinza (dessert), from Veneto
- Pinza bolognese

== People ==
- Ezio Pinza, Italian opera singer

== See also ==
- Pinsa
