= Pizza di Pasqua =

Italian savory cake

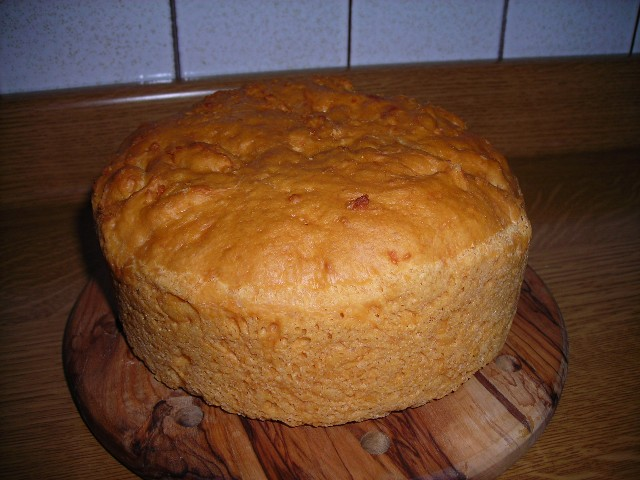
- Umbrian pizza di Pasqua
- Alternative names: Crescia di Pasqua, torta di Pasqua
- Type: Easter bread
- Course: Main dish
- Place of origin: Italy
- Region or state: Marche; Umbria; Lazio; Abruzzo; Molise
- Created by: Nuns of the monastery of Santa Maria Maddalena at Serra de' Conti, Ancona
- Serving temperature: Room temperature
- Main ingredients: Wheat flour, pecorino, Parmesan, eggs, olive oil or lard, natural yeast and milk
- Variations: Baker's yeast, emmentaler

Pizza di Pasqua (lit. 'Easter pizza'), in some areas also called crescia di Pasqua or torta di Pasqua, is a leavened savory cake typical of many areas of central Italy based on wheat flour, eggs, pecorino and Parmesan. Traditionally served at breakfast on Easter morning, or as an appetizer during Easter lunch, it is accompanied by blessed boiled eggs, ciauscolo and red wine or, again, served at the Easter Monday picnic. Having the same shape as panettone, pizza di Pasqua with cheese is a typical product of the Marche region, but also Umbrian (where, as a traditional food product, it obtained the Prodotti agroalimentari tradizionali (PAT) recognition). There is also a sweet variant. The peculiarity of this product is its shape, given by the particular mold in which it is leavened and then baked in the oven: originally in earthenware, today in aluminum, it has a flared shape.

== Etymology ==
The name pizza is here to be understood not in the recent meaning that has spread into Italian through the Neapolitan language, but in the original Medieval Latin meaning of 'focaccia', thus suggesting an ancient origin of the dish. The term piza in Medieval Latin is first attested in 966 in Naples and in 997 in Gaeta, and was also used to designate ceremonial food baked for Easter like the Easter pizzas. Similar preparations (pizza alla rustica, pizza di ricotta) can be found in cookery manuals from the early 19th century such as that of Vincenzo Agnoletti.

== Origins ==
According to tradition, pizza di Pasqua was first made in the Middle Ages by the nuns of the Poor Clares monastery of Santa Maria Maddalena at Serra de' Conti, near Ancona. The name crescia (by which it is known throughout the Marche region) refers to the crescita ('growth'), i.e. the dough growth due to the leavening process during baking. The first mention of the preparation of the crescia di Pasqua can be found in a cookbook written by the nuns and dating to 1848, entitled Memorie delle cresce di Pasqua fatte nel 1848 (Memories of the crescie di Pasqua made in 1848) and, later, in an anonymous Loreto cookbook of 1864 entitled Il cuoco delle Marche (The Cook of Marche).

== The recipe through the centuries ==
=== Ancient recipe ===
Recipe books dating back to the 1800s describe the recipe as follows: "For 3 crescie, and one for the father confessor, it takes 16 pounds of flour, a half of milk, eggs 40, 3 ounces of salt, pepper, an ounce and half of lard, 3 pounds of dry cheese and 8 of fresh cheese, included with the eyes, 2 little fogliette of oil, and half Paolo of good saffron, and this dose is enough for 24 people and father confessor." The 40 eggs provided in this recipe had to remember the 40 days of Lent. An alternative recipe described in the Memorie delle crescie di Pasqua fatte in 1848 requires "flour 50 pounds, grated old cheese 10 pounds, fresh cheese in judgment, milk 3 and a half jug, oil 4 pounds and a half, or as many as necessary, salt 1 pound and 3 ounces, pepper 3 ounces".

=== Modern recipe ===
The main ingredients are wheat flour, eggs, grated pecorino, grated Parmesan (or Grana Padano), chopped pecorino cheese, extra-virgin olive oil, salt, pepper, natural yeast and milk. Some recipes include the addition of other ingredients, such as saffron, or their substitution with similar ingredients, such as lard or butter instead of oil and emmental cheese instead of pecorino. The dough must be worked for a long time to allow the formation of the gluten mesh and promote leavening. The dough is then divided and placed in special molds which, covered and kept in a damp place, are subjected to a long leavening process and then cooked, according to tradition, in a wood-fired oven (formerly they were brought to a nearby bakery to be cooked).

== Religious and community tradition ==
According to religious tradition, pizza di Pasqua should be prepared on Maundy Thursday or Good Friday to be eaten at Easter, following the period of fasting and abstinence dictated by Lent. Until the introduction of modern heating systems, pizzas were leavened in beds heated with il prete (lit. 'the priest', a wooden and sheet metal sled) containing embers from the fireplace. Then they were taken to be baked in the village oven. Once ready, it was customary to bring the pizza di Pasqua to the church, so that it would be blessed together with the other foods to be consumed on Easter day.

== Sweet variant ==
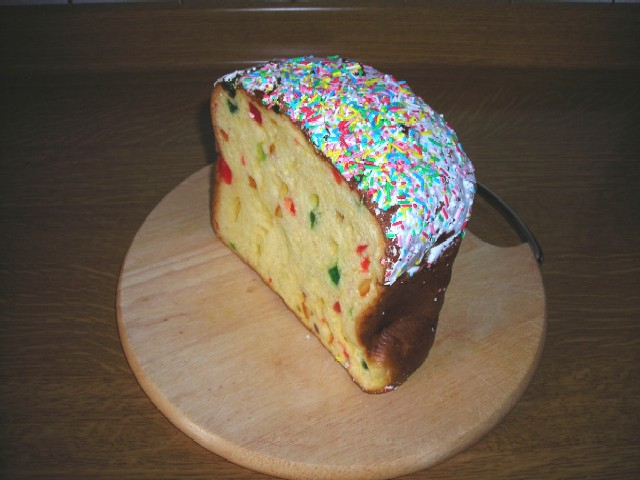
Sweet variant of pizza di Pasqua

In the Umbria-Marche areas there is also a sweet variant. This sweet pie, without cheese, with candied fruits or without, in addition to the presence of sugar has also a fiocca, a meringue glazed with sugar beads.

== See also ==
Media related to Pizza di Pasqua at Wikimedia Commons

== Bibliography ==
- Gosetti Della Salda, Anna (1967). Le ricette regionali italiane (in Italian). Milano: Solares.
- Faccioli, Emilio (1987). L'Arte della cucina in Italia (in Italian). Milano: Einaudi.
- Tommaso Lucchetti (2010). La cucina dello spirito. Storie, segreti, ricette della mensa monastica dal Piceno alle Marche (in Italian). Ancona: Il Lavoro Editoriale. ISBN 978-88-7663-462-8.
- Tommaso Lucchetti (2012). La cucina delle monache. I ricettari delle clarisse di Serra de' Conti (in Italian). Ancona: Il Lavoro Editoriale. ISBN 978-88-7663-672-1.
