= Pinsa =

Pinsa or PINSA may refer to:

- Pensa, Burkina Faso
- Proceedings of the Indian National Science Academy (PINSA)
- Pinsa (bread), an oval-shaped flatbread
