= Colomba pasquale =

Italian traditional Easter cake

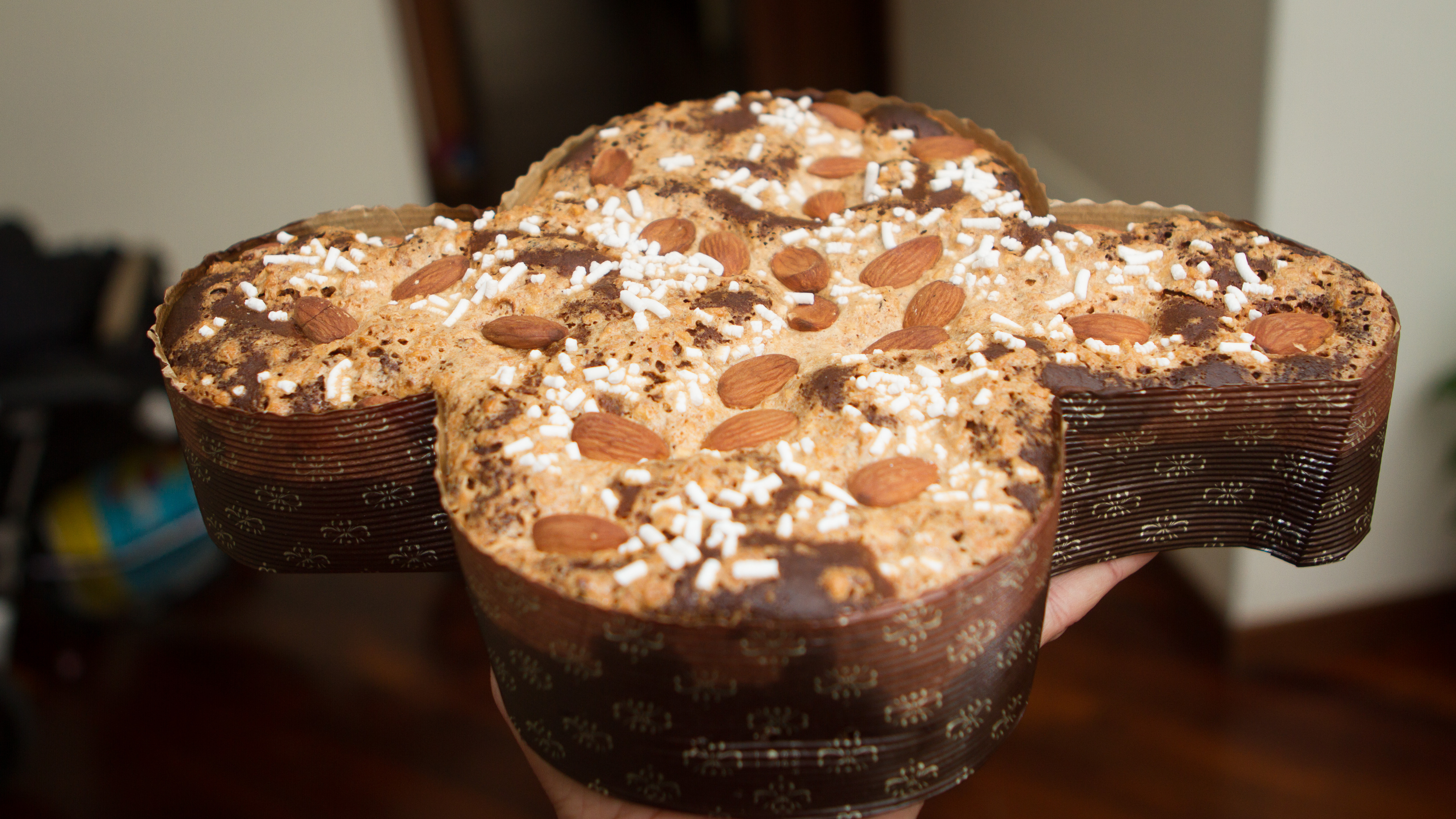
- Alternative names: Colomba di Pasqua
- Course: Dessert
- Place of origin: Italy
- Region or state: Milan, Lombardy
- Created by: Angelo Motta
- Main ingredients: Flour, eggs, sugar, butter, candied peel, pearl sugar, almonds

Colomba pasquale (Italian: [koˈlomba paˈskwaːle]) or colomba di Pasqua (Italian: [koˈlomba di ˈpaskwa]) (lit. 'Easter dove') is an Italian traditional Easter bread, the Easter counterpart of the two well-known Italian Christmas desserts, panettone and pandoro.

The dough for the colomba pasquale is made in a similar manner to panettone, with flour, eggs, sugar, natural yeast, and butter; unlike panettone, it usually contains candied peel and no raisins. The dough is then fashioned into a dove (colomba in Italian) shape and finally is topped with pearl sugar and almonds before being baked. Some manufacturers produce other versions, including a popular bread topped with chocolate.

Colomba pasquale was commercialised in the 1930s by Dino Villani, who worked as the advertising director for the Milanese company Motta, which was already famous for its Christmas speciality, panettone. Villani had the idea to create an Easter bread using the same machinery and the same dough as panettone. The owner of Motta, Milanese baker and businessman Angelo Motta, sent the new creation to many journalists and writers to test the new creation and it was met with wide success. As a result, another Milanese company, Vergani, followed suit making colomba pasquale there in 1944.

== See also ==
- List of Italian desserts and pastries
- List of almond dishes
- Easter bread
- Pandoro
- Panettone
- Panone
