= Angelo Motta =

Italian entrepreneur (1890–1957)

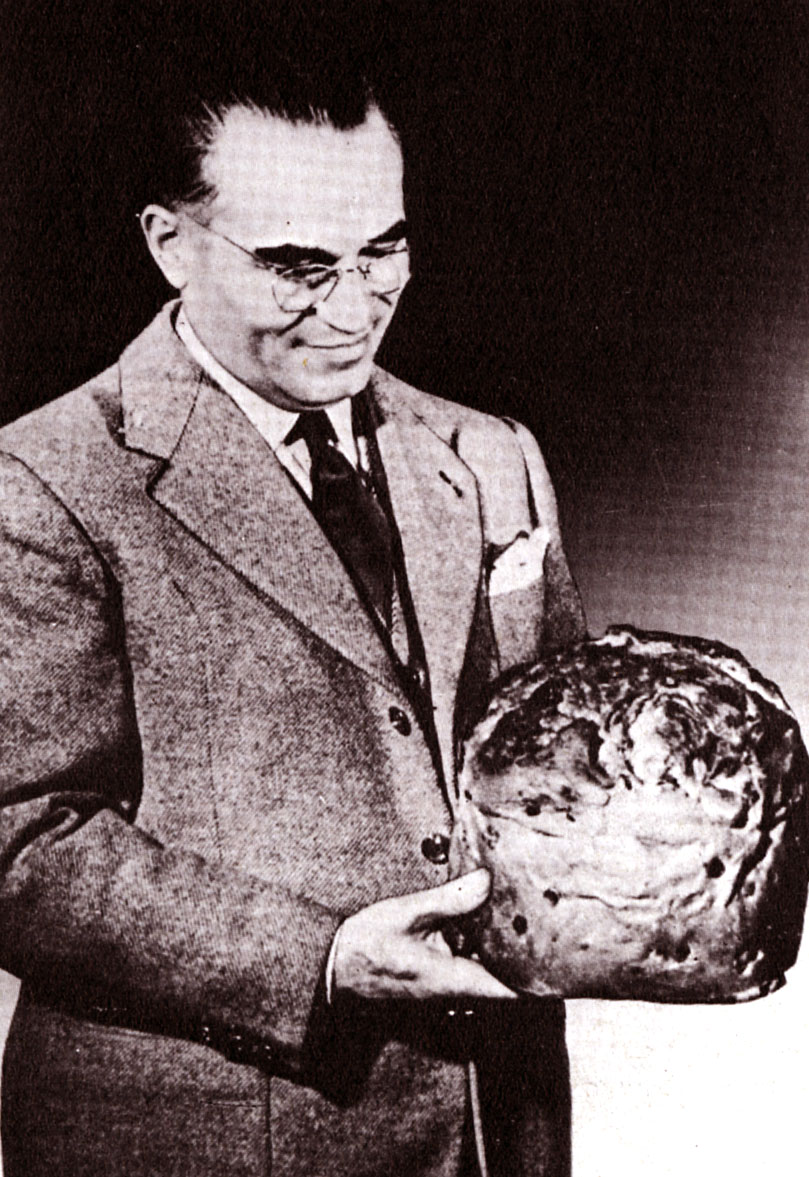
- Motta while admiring his panettone
- Born: 8 September 1890; Gessate, Lombardy, Kingdom of Italy
- Died: 26 December 1957 (aged 67); Milan, Italy
- Occupations: Baker; entrepreneur

Angelo Motta (8 September 1890 – 26 December 1957) was an Italian entrepreneur and founder of the food company Motta. He is associated with the commercial production of the sweet yeast bread panettone.

== Biography ==
Motta was a Milanese pastry chef before leaving for military service during World War I. After the war, in 1919, he opened his first bakery and started the production of the panettone, a typically Milanese cake, first in the form of a handmade version and later expanding his production to make panettone at an industrial plant. Motta and his rival panettone maker Gioacchino Alemagna are credited with the industrialisation of panettone from its Milanese origins to a staple of the Italian Christmas. Production had expanded considerably by 1930, and a new large factory was required on the outskirts of town to replace the four small bakeries that Motta was using. In 1935, L'Illustrazione Italiana reported that the new factory had a conveyor belt measuring thirty metres and large industrial ovens to keep up with production.

Motta's contribution to panettone was to create a distinctive high dome shape for his bread that replaced the older style of flatter panettone as the standard. His startling success saw his company expand considerably during the interwar years, with Motta Foods introducing new bread, including a celebratory Easter bread known as a colomba pasquale, a dove-shaped yeast bread that uses panettone yeast but contains less fruit. Panettone became the de rigueur holiday gift to give to staff. Top artists were commissioned by Motta to immortalise his bread in advertisements. Prices were slashed to attract yet more consumers.

The Motta and Alemagna brands are now owned by Bauli, an Italian bakery company based in Verona.

== Awards ==
In 1939, Angelo Motta was awarded Knight of the Equestrian Order of the Holy Sepulchre, a prestigious Catholic chivalric order.

Motta was also a Grand Officer of the Order of Merit of the Italian Republic.

== See also ==
- List of people from Milan
