= Casatiello =

Italian leavened savory bread

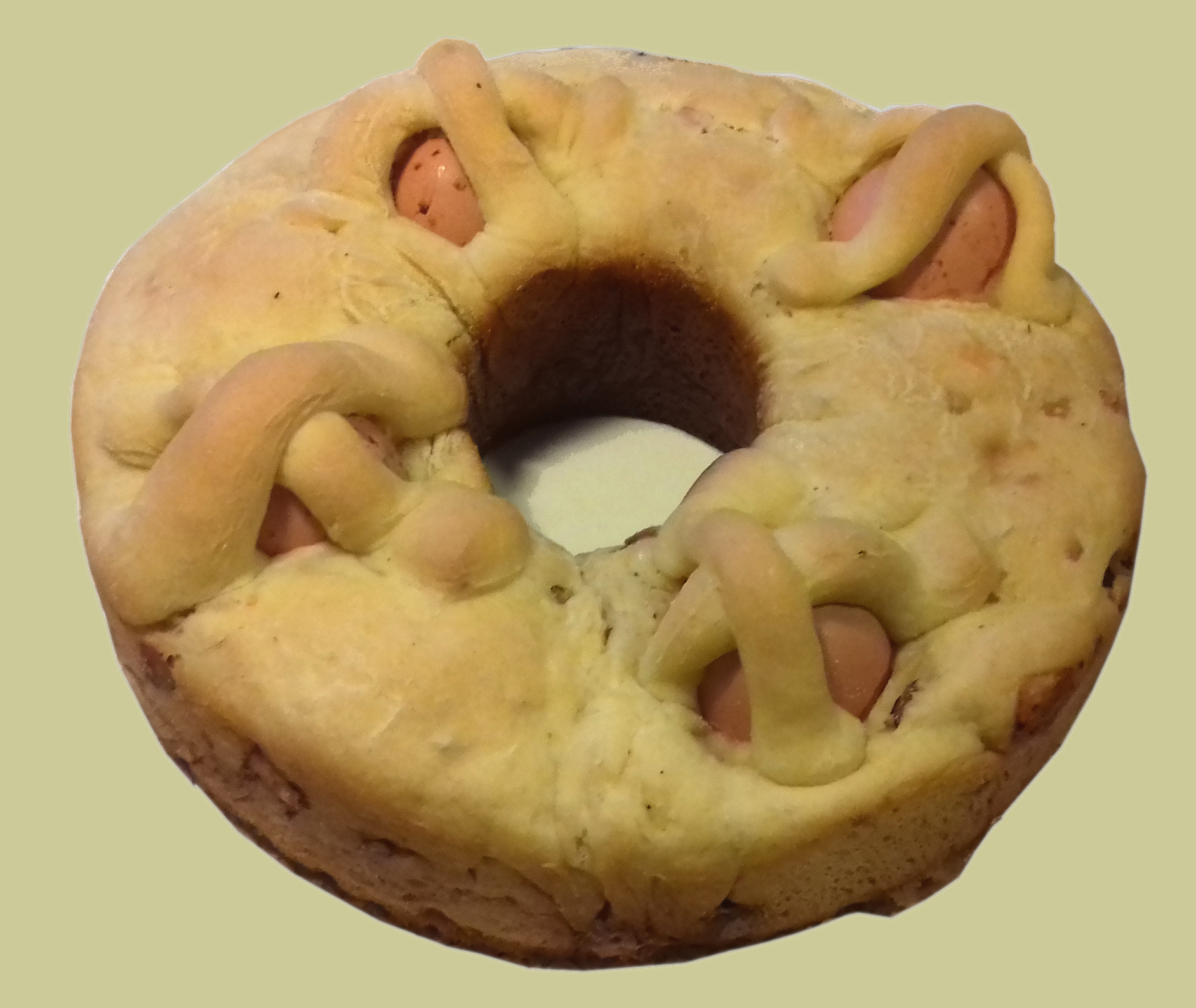
- A casatiello in Rome in 2017
- Type: Easter bread
- Course: Main dish
- Place of origin: Italy
- Region or state: Campania
- Serving temperature: Room temperature
- Main ingredients: Wheat flour, salami, cheese, eggs, cracklings, lard and natural yeast
- Variations: Baker's yeast

Casatiello (Neapolitan: casatiéllo; Italian: casatiello or casatello) is a leavened savory bread originating from Naples prepared during the Easter period. There are sweet versions of the bread in various regions of Italy.

Its basic ingredients are flour, lard, cheese, salami, cracklings, eggs and black pepper.

== Etymology ==
The bread's name derives probably from the Neapolitan word caso (Italian: cacio, 'cheese', hence casatiello), an ingredient that is part of its dough.

== History ==
The existence of casatiello, like that of pastiera, another Neapolitan Easter product, has been attested at least since the seventeenth century: the proof comes from the folk tale La gatta Cenerentola (Italian for 'Cinderella the Cat') published in 1634–1636 in the short story collection Pentamerone, ovvero Lo Cunto de li cunti by Giambattista Basile, a Neapolitan writer (writing in the Neapolitan language) who lived between the 16th and 17th centuries.

The bread is mentioned in the passage where he describes the king's celebrations to find the girl who had lost her slipper:

E, venuto lo juorno destenato, oh bene mio: che mazzecatorio e che bazzara che se facette! Da dove vennero tante pastiere e casatielle? Dove li sottestate e le porpette? Dove li maccarune e graviuole? Tanto che 'nce poteva magnare n'asserceto formato.

Translation:

And when the established day came, oh my goodness: what a chew and what a feast! Where did so many pastiere and casatielli come from? Where did the stews and meatballs come from? Where did the macaroni and ravioli come from? So much stuff that an entire army could eat.

In the 19th century, casatiello is also mentioned in the book Costumi e tradizioni di Napoli e dintorni (Italian for 'Customs and traditions of Naples and the surrounding area'), published in 1858 and edited by Francesco De Bourcard, a Neapolitan scholar of Swiss origin, who describes the bread and its preparation, stating that the casatello (sic) was baked at home for the Easter lunch and offered as a gift to neighbors and "to the servants and the laundress".

== Ingredients and preparation ==
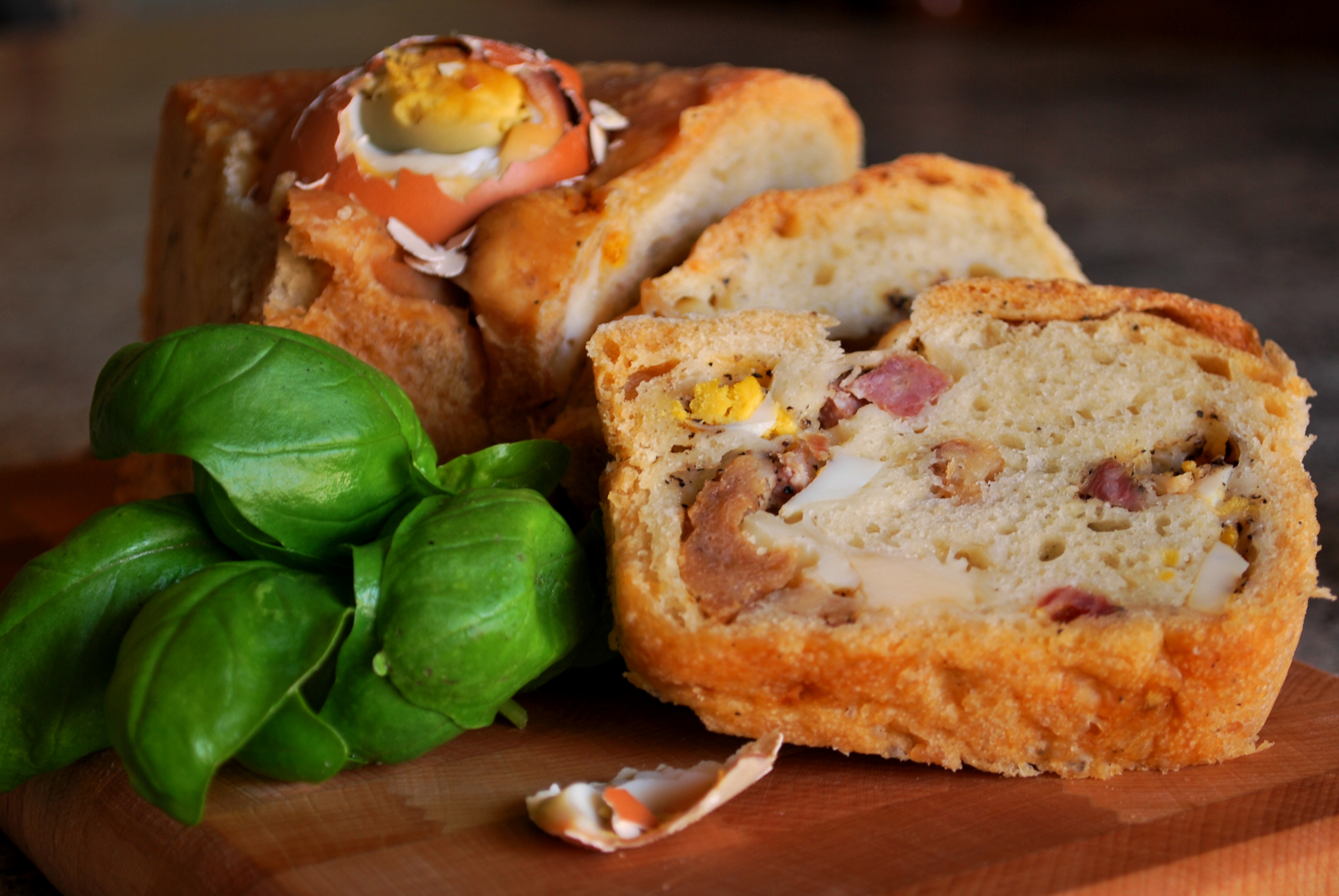
A sliced casatiello

Casatiello is based on a bread dough enriched with cheese (usually smoked scamorza, but also pecorino and some Parmesan can be used), lard, ciccioli and other cured meats.

The dough is worked into the shape of a doughnut, placed in a mould and left to rise for a long time, at least 12 hours; if made with quick leaven, about two hours are enough. The bread is then baked, traditionally in a wood-fired oven.

Casatiello is usually prepared on Good Friday, left to rise overnight, baked the following day, and eaten on Holy Saturday and Easter Monday.

The casatiello, unlike similar products such as tortano, is prepared around Easter, from which it borrows the symbolism: the strips of bread arranged to cage the eggs half-submerged in the dough represent the cross on which Jesus died while the ring shape is a reminder of the cyclical nature of the Easter resurrection and of Christ's crown of thorns.

During the preparation, the eggs are placed whole and baked in the oven together with the dough. While some bakers put them raw, others prefer to use already hard-boiled eggs. The cooking takes place at 170 °C (338 °F) for about 60 minutes.

The bread can also be used as a packed lunch during the traditional trips out of town (Italian: Gite fuori porta) on Easter Monday.

Casatiello can be kept for a maximum of two or three days, then it becomes harder and harder. In Naples, a stale casatiello is named "ammazzaruto" (lit. 'not enough leavened'), and then by extension "hard".

== Variants ==
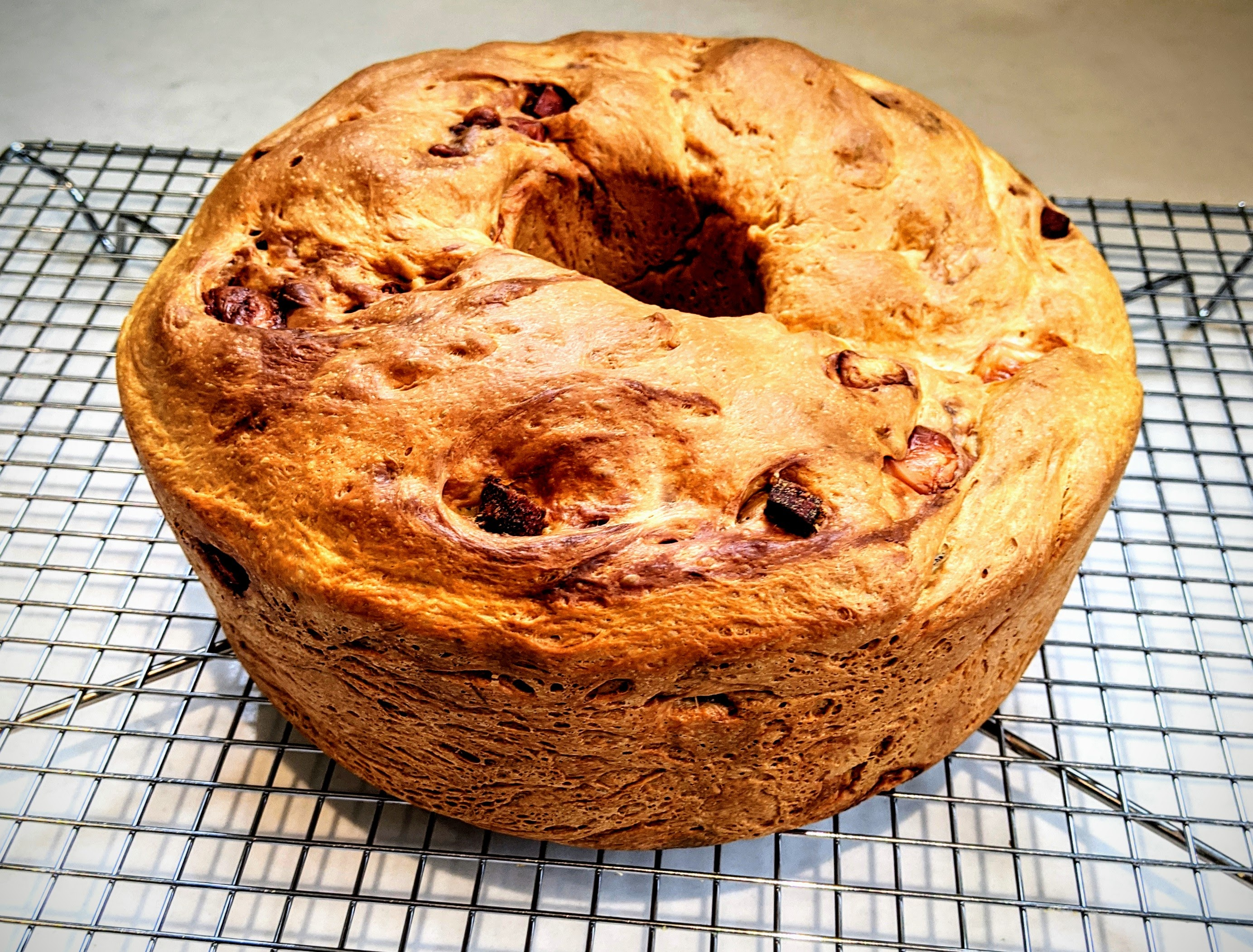
A tortano

Tortano is a very similar product: the two main differences are the use of eggs, which in casatiello are also placed in the upper part and not only hard-boiled and in small pieces in the dough as in tortano, and that of charcuterie, which is part of the dough filling in casatiello, whereas it is omitted in tortano.

=== Sweet variant ===
The sweet version of casatiello has as main ingredients eggs, sugar, lard and icing, and is decorated on the surface with diavulilli ('little devils', Neapolitan for 'coloured dragées'). This variant is widespread in Caserta, in the island of Procida and in the Benevento and Vesuvian area. Other sweet versions are found in Monte di Procida and in the Nolano area.

== In popular culture ==
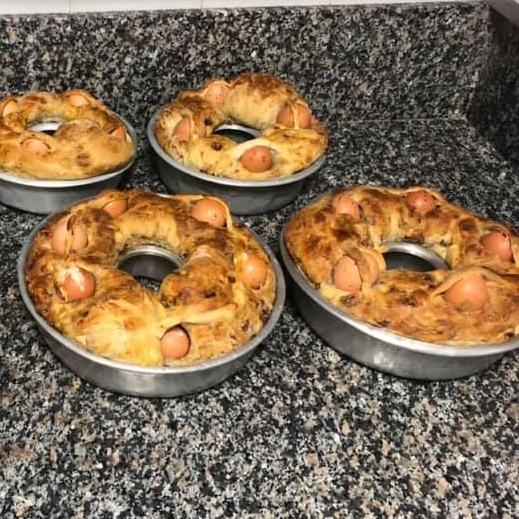
Homemade casatielli at Naples

In reference to the heaviness of the dish, in Naples it is customary to say "Sí proprio 'nu casatiéllo" (Italian: sei proprio un casatiello; lit. 'You are really a casatiello'), to mean 'You are a person of quality but also an indigestible boring person'.

== See also ==
Media related to Casatiello at Wikimedia Commons

== Bibliography ==
- Emmanuele Rocco (1866) [1858]. "Le Feste di Pasqua". In Francesco de Bourcard (ed.). Usi e costumi di Napoli e contorni descritti e dipinti (in Italian). Vol. 2. Napoli: Tipografia G. Nobile.
- Barbagli, Annalisa (2002). La cucina di casa del Gambero Rosso. Le 1000 ricette (in Italian). Roma: Gambero Rosso. ISBN 8887180539.
- Vv.Aa. (2006). "Casatiello". L'Enciclopedia della Cucina Italiana (in Italian). Vol. 9. Novara: De Agostini. pp. 34–35.
- Capasso, Emilia (2010). I sapori della cucina vesuviana (in Italian). Napoli: Guida Editori. ISBN 978-8860428172.
