= Sirnica =

Sirnica may refer to:

- Pinca
- Cheese burek
