= Pandoro =

Italian sweet bread

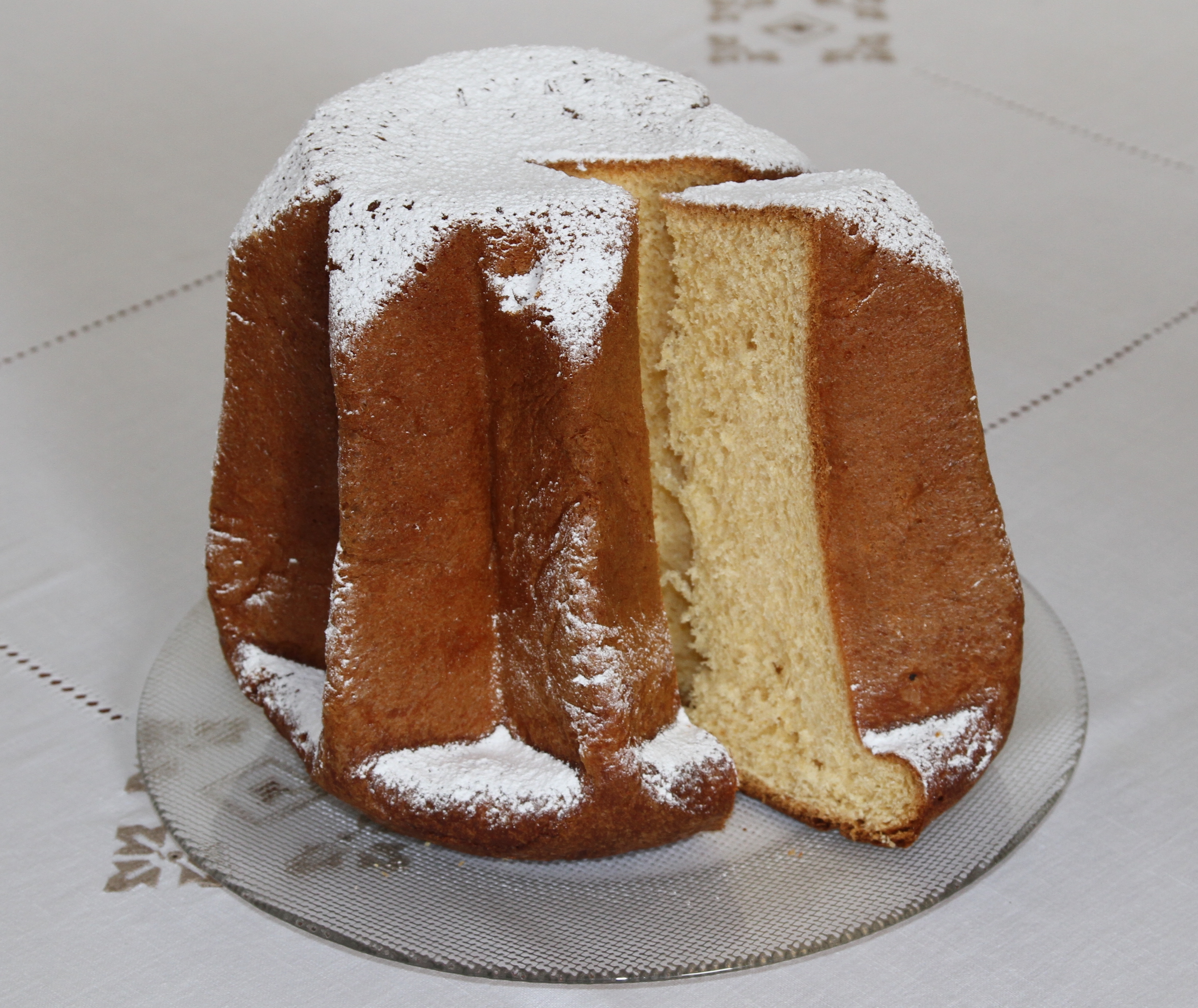
- Type: Dessert bread
- Place of origin: Italy
- Region or state: Verona, Veneto
- Created by: Domenico Melegatti
- Main ingredients: Flour, eggs, butter, sugar

Pandoro (Italian: [panˈdɔːro]) is an Italian sweet bread, most popular around Christmas and New Year. Typically a product of the city of Verona, Veneto, pandoro traditionally has an eight-pointed shape. It is often dusted with vanilla scented icing sugar, which is said to resemble the snowy peaks of the Alps during Christmas. Its name and origins are attributed to the Italian pastry chef Domenico Melegatti.

== History ==
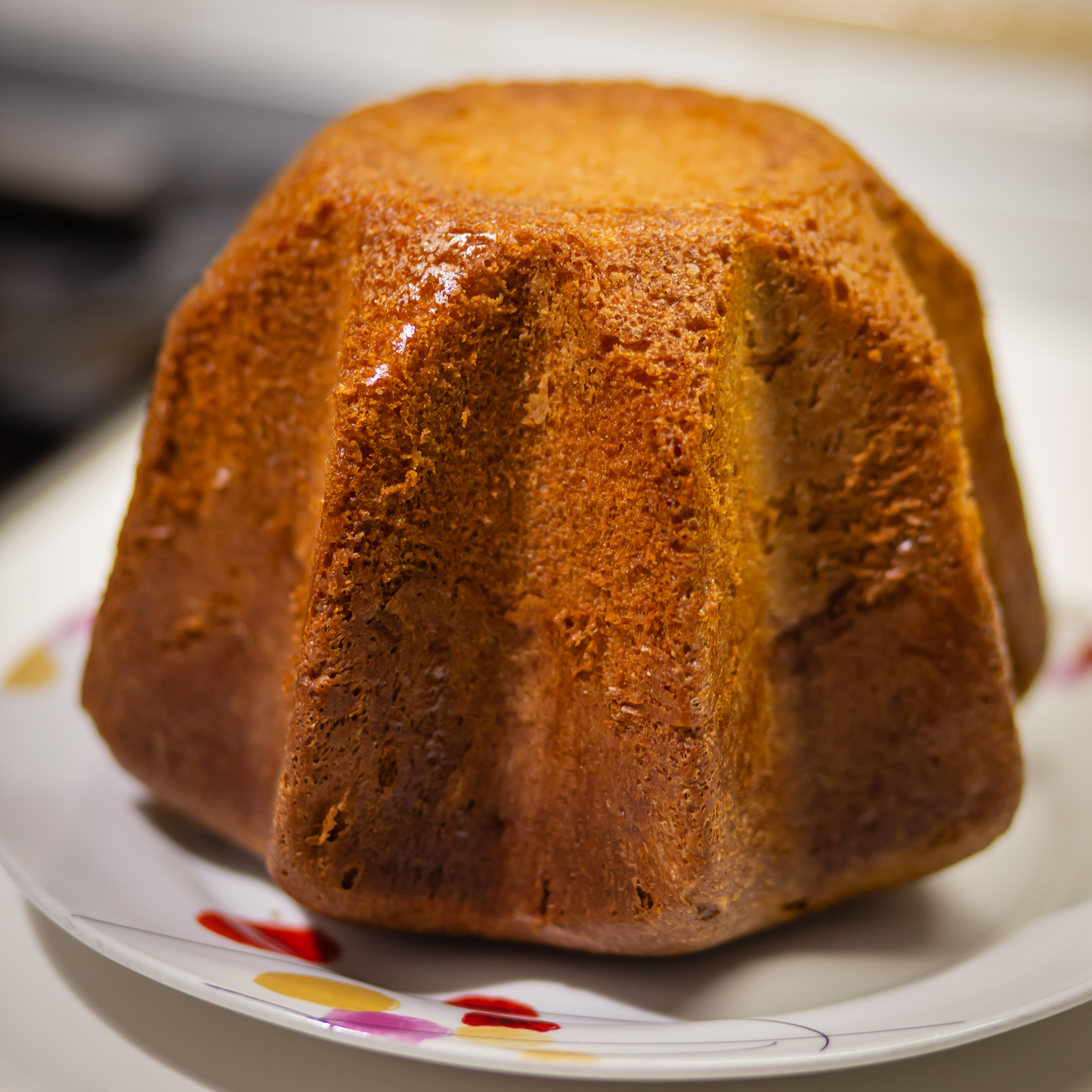
Pandoro

The first citation of a dessert clearly identified as pandoro dates to the 18th century. The dessert certainly figured in the cuisine of the Venetian aristocracy. Venice was the principal market for spices as late as the 18th century, as well as for the sugar that by then had replaced honey in European pastries and bread made from leavened dough. It was at Verona, in Venetian territory, that the formula for making pandoro was developed and perfected, a process that required a century. The modern history of this dessert bread began there on October 30, 1894, when Domenico Melegatti obtained a patent for a procedure to be applied in producing pandoro industrially. Domenico Melegatti formed a pandoro company in 1894, Melegatti, which was declared bankrupt on 29 May 2018, despite a Maltese equity fund funded Christmas 2017 direct-to-retail campaign. The feuding Ronca (70%) and Turco (30%) families from the Verona area brought Melegatti to crisis. In 2018, the Spezzapria family bought the company assets of Melegatti 1894 S.p.A. from bankruptcy trustees for €13.5m, as the only bidder in the second auction, the first auction ended with no bidders. In 2025, the assets of Melegatti 1894 S.p.A. were acquired by Irish Valeo Foods, a Bain Capital company.

== See also ==
- List of Italian desserts and pastries
- Colomba pasquale (Easter bread)
- Panettone
- Panone
