= Bauli =

Italian food company

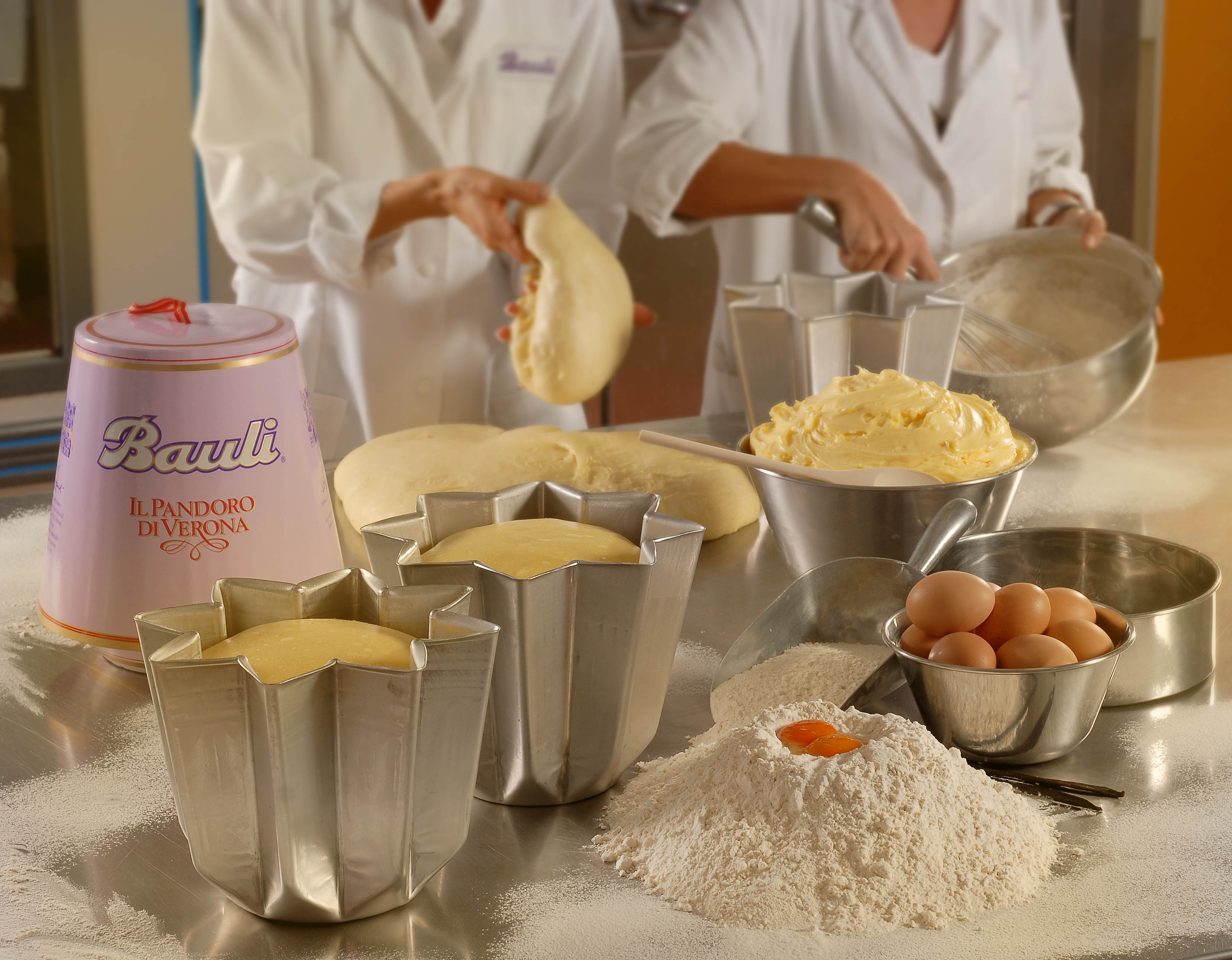
- Type: Società per azioni
- Industry: Food processing
- Founded: 1922; 104 years ago
- Founder: Ruggero Bauli
- Headquarters: Castel d'Azzano, Italy
- Area served: Worldwide
- Key people: Michele Bauli (president)
- Products: Bakery products
- Revenue: €472 million (2018)
- Net income: €10.2 million (2018)
- Number of employees: 1,412 (2017)
- Website: www.bauli.it/it

Bauli S.p.A. is an Italian food company of bakery products such as pandoro, panettone, colomba and cornetti, founded in Verona in 1922 by pastry chef Ruggero Bauli.

Between 2020 and 2021, Bauli re-confirmed itself as the leader company in the recurrence market with a 37% share for Christmas and 33% for Easter.

== History ==
The company was founded by Ruggero Bauli in 1922 in Verona. The Bauli market share in so-called special occasion products (colombe, pandoro and panettone) stands at over 32.5% for Easter products and 39% for Christmas products.

Production is around 7 million pandoro, 8.2 million traditional panettone, 400 million croissants, as well as traditional colombe and other puff pastry-based products and biscuits.

In 2004 Bauli bought the company F.b.f. and in 2006 the Treviso-based company Doria, producer of "Bucaneve", "Atene" and "Doriano" biscuits.

On 31 July 2009, Bauli acquired from the Nestlé group the bakery products marketed under the Motta, Alemagna, "Tartufone Motta", "Trinidad" and "Gran Soffice" brands and the related production site in San Martino Buon Albergo.

On 9 February 2013 Bauli took over the Bistefani group, producer of Krumiri biscuits; three years later, in March 2016, the company's Casale Monferrato plant closed.

In 2017, Bauli opened their first factory in Baramati in India, investing €34 million, hoping to make India their second largest market.

Bauli also operates 13 "Minuto Bauli" coffee bars across the North of Italy, in addition to one located in Vienna, with a further store planned in New York City.
