= Gioacchino Alemagna =

Italian pastry chef and entrepreneur (1892–1974)

Gioacchino Alemagna (sometimes spelled Giacchino; 13 May 1892 – 23 September 1974), was an Italian pastry chef and entrepreneur, and the founder of the Alemagna food company.

== Biography ==
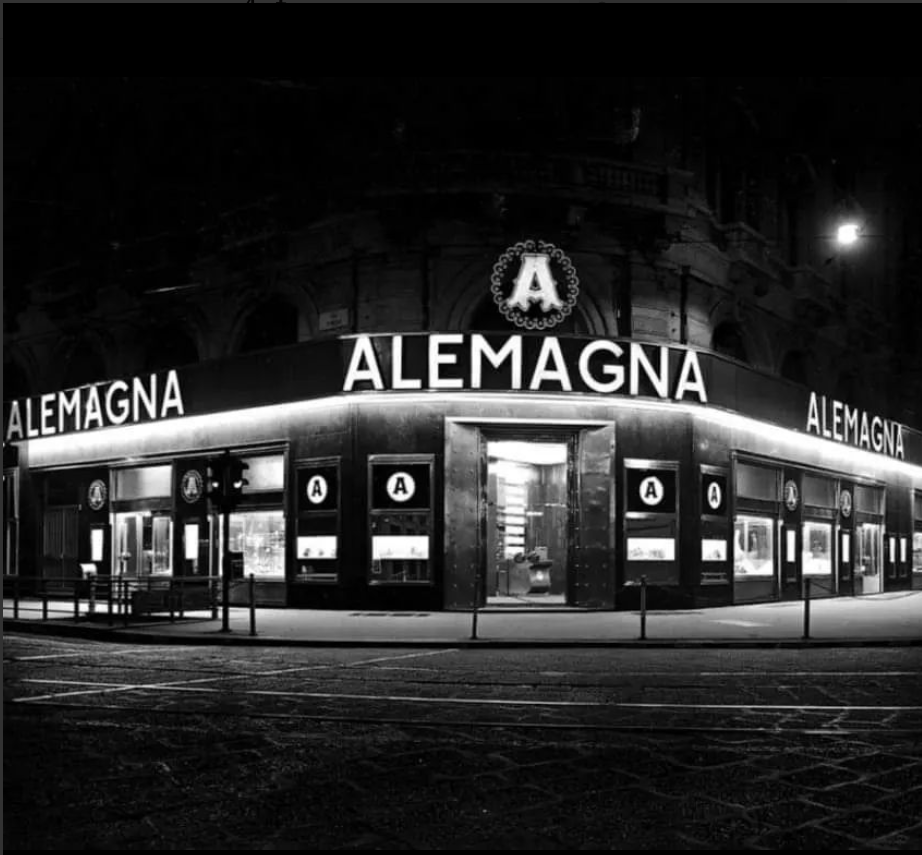
Alemagna shop in Turin, during 1950s

Alemagna was born on 13 May 1892, in Melegnano, a comune (municipality) in Lombardy, Italy. He set up his first confectionery bakery in Milan in the 1920s, and opened his own pastry shop in 1925, where he directly sold his products. In 1933, he expanded his business, with a pastry shop adjacent to Milan's Piazza del Duomo. The shop became a popular spot in the prewar years, thanks to the production and sale of panettone, an Alemagna speciality. Alemagna had the largest factory in Milan's Via Silva, with more than 30 baking ovens and 2,000 employees. After World War II, Gioacchino retired and sold the company to his son Alberto. Gioacchino died in Milan on 23 September 1974.
