= Panettone =

Italian yeasted cake

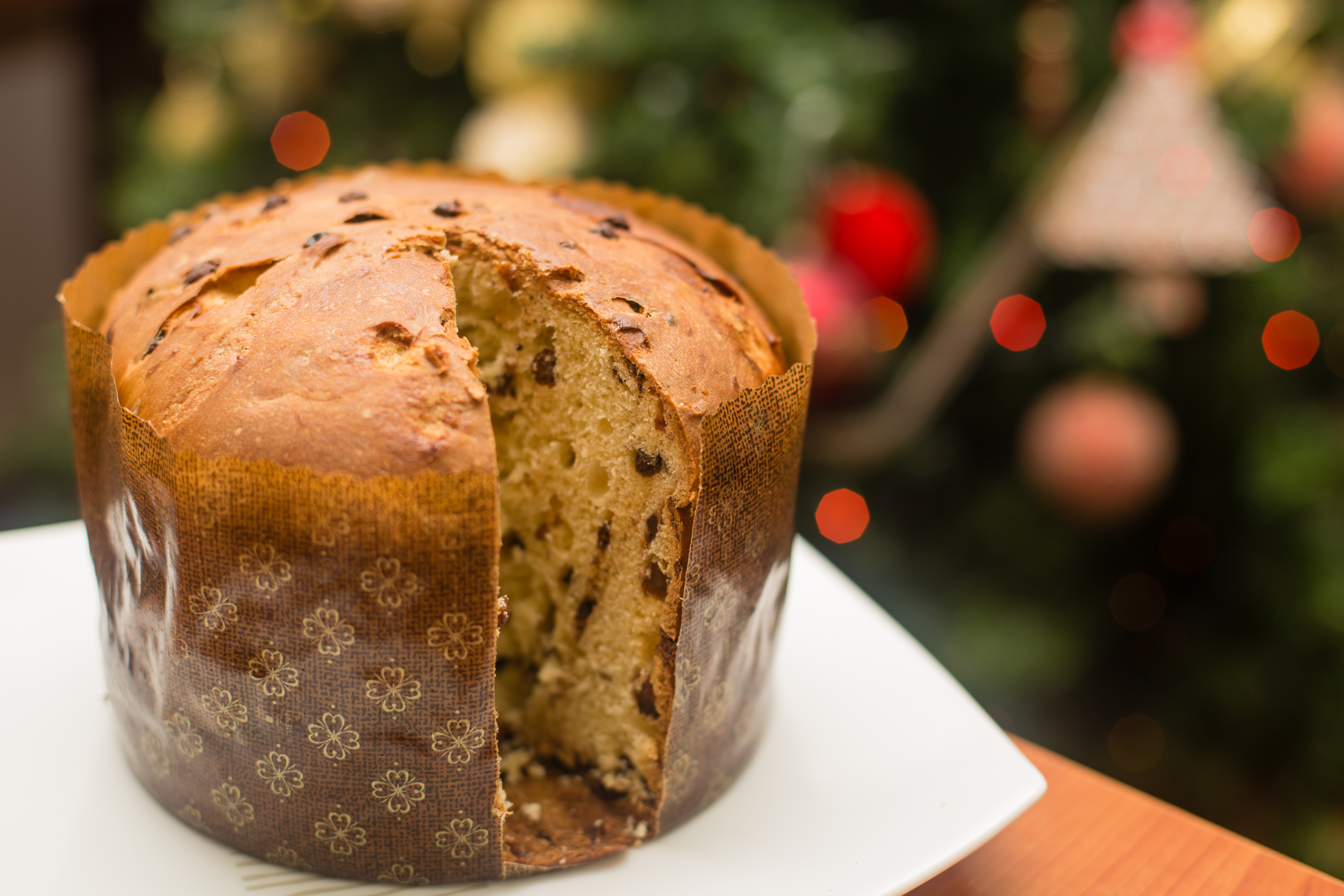
- Type: Yeast cake
- Place of origin: Italy
- Region or state: Milan, Lombardy
- Main ingredients: Flour, candied fruits, raisins

Panettone (Note: /ˌpænɪˈtoʊni/ PAN-ih-TOH-nee; Italian: [panetˈtoːne]; Milanese: panetton [paneˈtũː].) is an Italian sweet bread and fruitcake that is associated with the city of Milan, Lombardy. It is usually prepared for Christmas and New Year in Western, Southern, and Southeastern Europe, as well as in South America, Eritrea, Australia, and North America. Panettone is tall, with the appearance and texture of bread. Despite such an appearance, panettone is understood in Italy to be a dessert, one that would be out of place in a bread bakery.

== History ==
=== Early ===
In Italy, historical accounts of panettone invariably state that it originated in Milan. The origin of the word is to be found in the Milanese dialect panattón, augmentative of pan ('bread'), or panett ('small bread containing a large amount of yeast'). The augmentative suffix -one changes the meaning to 'large bread'. Food historian Francine Segan describes the cake as "probably" created in the 15th century. Despite panettone from Milan being the most popular variety across Italy, Italian author Ada Boni reported in her 1969 Italian Regional Cooking that claims of creation exist across northern Italy—in Venice and Turin with their panettone, and in Genoa with its Genoa cake, known in Italy as pandolce.

Popular tales abound describing panettone's creation. In the most famous, taking place in the 15th century, a wealthy Milanese noble sought to marry the daughter of Tony, a poor baker. To ingratiate himself, the noble furnished the girl's father with the ability to source the best quality flour, eggs, raisins, candied citrus, and sugar, leading to the development of a rich bread to great commercial success. This new food was named pan di Tonio, and the noble was given the hand of the baker's daughter in marriage.

In another telling, the roles are reversed, with a baker named Tony hoping to marry the daughter of a rich noble. Creating and serving panettone in an effort to impress, Tony was rewarded with the noble's approval and his own bakery. Food scholar Cathy Kaufman identifies the popularity of this account in its proximity to analogies within Christian thought, which analogise romantic love and the love of Jesus Christ at Christmas. Another reason Kaufman supplies is the popularity of weddings during the twelve days between Christmas and Epiphany in pre-industrial Europe, after the slaughter replenished food stocks.

Panettone may be mentioned in a recipe book written by Italian Bartolomeo Scappi, a personal chef to popes and emperors during the early 16th century in the reign of Charles V. The oldest and most certain attestation of the panettone is found in a register of expenses of the Borromeo college of Pavia, Lombardy, in 1599: on 23 December of that year in the list of courses provided for Christmas lunch, costs also appear for 5 pounds of butter, 2 pounds of raisins and 3 ounces of spices given to the baker to make 13 "loaves" to be given to college students on Christmas Day. The first recorded association of panettone with Christmas can be found in the Italian writings of the 18th century Enlightenment thinker Pietro Verri. He refers to it as pan de ton ('luxury bread').

The first printed recipe for panettone appears in the third edition of 1853's Nuovo cuoco economico milanese by Giovanni Felice Luraschi (pasta per far panatoni). Panettone around this time was unaffordable to much of the Milanese. One such purchase of a small panettone and 200 grams of sugared almonds from a pastry shop is recorded in 1874, costing 2.35 lira (approximately €9 in 2020).

=== 20th and 21st centuries ===
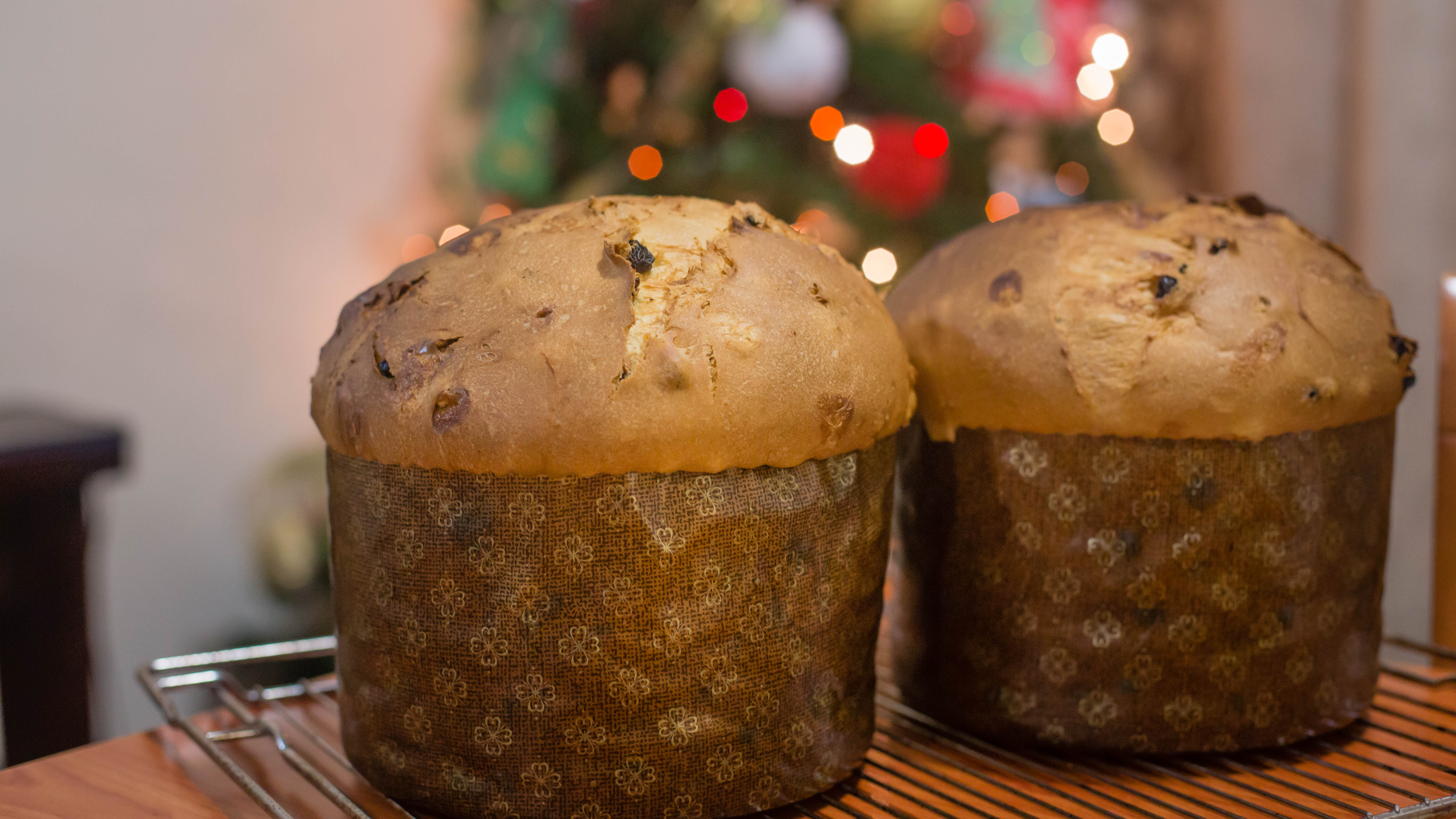
Homemade panettone

In the early 20th century, two Milanese bakers began to produce panettone in large quantities for the rest of Italy. In 1919, Angelo Motta started producing his eponymous brand of cakes. It was also Motta who gave the panettone its tall domed shape and light texture by letting the dough rise three times over almost 20 hours before cooking. The recipe was adapted shortly after by another baker, Gioacchino Alemagna, around 1925, who gave his name to a brand that still exists today. The stiff competition between the two that then ensued led to industrial production of the cake.

During the 1970s, panettone entered the cuisine of southern Italy at a time when a singular, national Italian cuisine emerged. Advertisements on television promoted panettone in the new markets, arguing its industrial production ensured hygiene and quality.

Nestlé took over the Motta and Alemagna brands in the late 1990s, but Bauli, an Italian bakery company based in Verona, has since acquired Motta and Alemagna from Nestlé. Although panettone remained associated with holidays, by this point it was eaten throughout the year in Italy. By the 2010s, panettone produced by artisans or flavoured with local ingredients is held in higher regard in southern Italy over those produced industrially. One such variation in Campania is a panettone flavoured with limoncello.

== Outside of Italy ==
Panettone is popular within Italian communities in South America, the US, Canada, Australia, and the UK.

Following immigration to South America in the late 19th century, panettone has been a staple at Christmas dinners. In these countries, panettone takes on different names; in Peru, panetón, and in Argentina, pan dulce.

In Peru, Panettone arrived around the 1930s thanks to the Italian company Motta, although it was in the 1950s when Antonio D'Onofrio, son of immigrants hailing from Caserta, Italy, spawned his own brand using a slightly modified form of the Alemagna formula (e.g., candied papaya is used instead of candied citron and lemon), which he licensed along with the packaging style. By the end of the 2010s, Peru had passed Italy in panettone consumption, with one survey finding the average Peruvian ate 2.4 lb (1.1 kg) of panettone per year.

Bauli started popularizing its panettone in Argentina following the immigration of its founder, Ruggero Bauli, from Italy, owing to the 1927 shipwreck of the SS Principessa Mafalda. In North America in the 21st century, some bakeries and cookbooks moved to a panettone made from wild yeast rather than commercial yeast, following a major bakery in Italy that had gained commercial success with wild yeasts. In the UK, panettone is sometimes used to make bread and butter pudding.

As of 2007, efforts were underway to obtain protected designation of origin (PDO) and denominazione di origine controllata (DOC) status for panettone.

== Ingredients ==
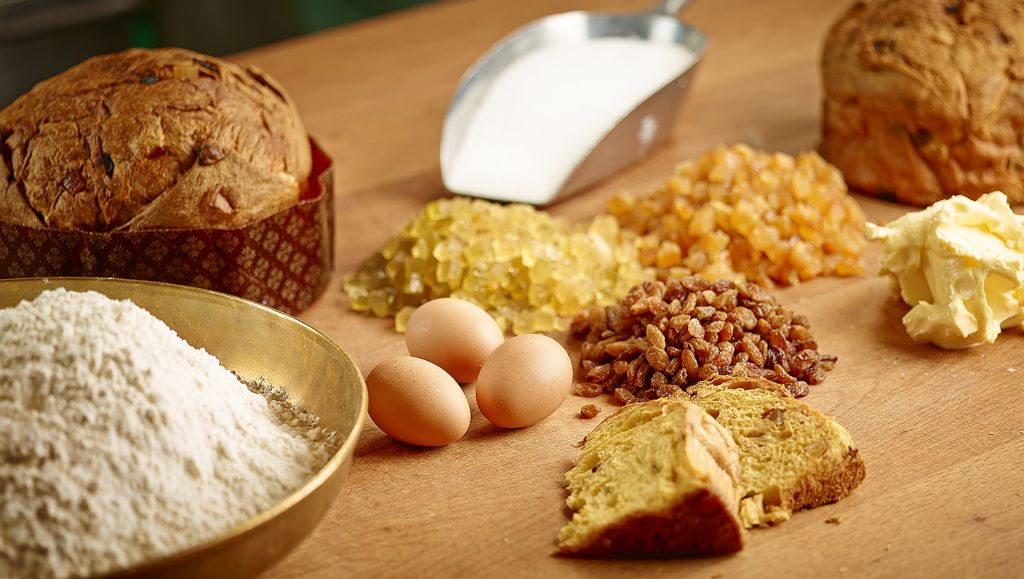
Ingredients for panettone

Panettone is made from a flour milled from hard wheat. Raisins and pieces of candied orange and citron are distributed throughout, sometimes substituted or supplemented with almonds, chocolate, and other dried fruits such as apricots and apples. Sometimes, liquors and alcohol-based citrus or almond extracts are added for further flavour. Yeast may be commercial or wild, the latter producing a panettone with a longer shelf life. Panettone prepared from a commercial yeast, typically Kazachstania exigua, contains several lactic acid bacteria. (Note: These include Fructilactobacillus sanfranciscensis, L. brevis, and L. plantarum.)

== Preparation ==
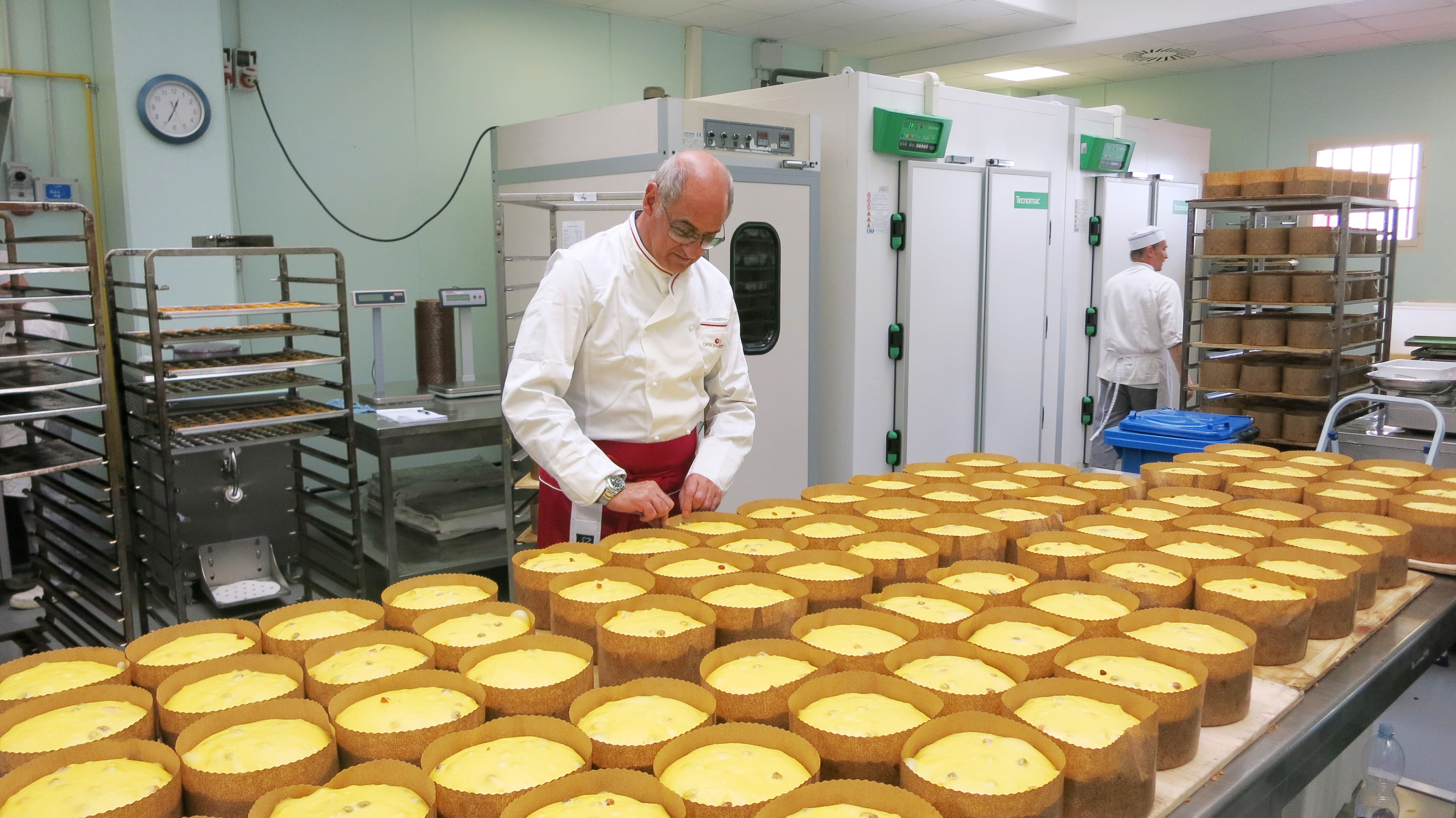
Preparation of panettone in prison

The basic dough for panettone is very close to several other European holiday breads, including the German stollen, the Greek tsoureki and christopsomo, and the Italian colomba pasquale and pandoro. Distinctions arise from their symbolism, shaping, and history. Panettone has high levels of fat and requires intensive mixing.

Panettone is shaped on a surface that is sometimes buttered and then baked in a tall, cylindrical mold. Atypically for a sweetened dough containing yeast, panettone is not steamed during cooking. Baking paper designed specially for panettone is sold commercially. After baking, panettone is hung upside down as it cools, preventing the bubbles in the dough from collapsing. In a commercial bakery, this may be done with special equipment, and in smaller batches they may be hung between tables, suspended with wooden skewers.

Panettone has a cupola shape, which extends from a cylindrical base and is usually about 12–15 centimetres (4 1/2–6 inches) high for a panettone weighing one kilogram (two pounds). Other bases may be used, such as an octagon, or a frustum with a star section shape more common to pandoro. It is made during a long process that involves curing the dough, which is acidic, similar to sourdough. The proofing process alone takes several days, giving the cake its distinctive fluffy characteristics. Variations include plain or with chocolate.

== Serving ==
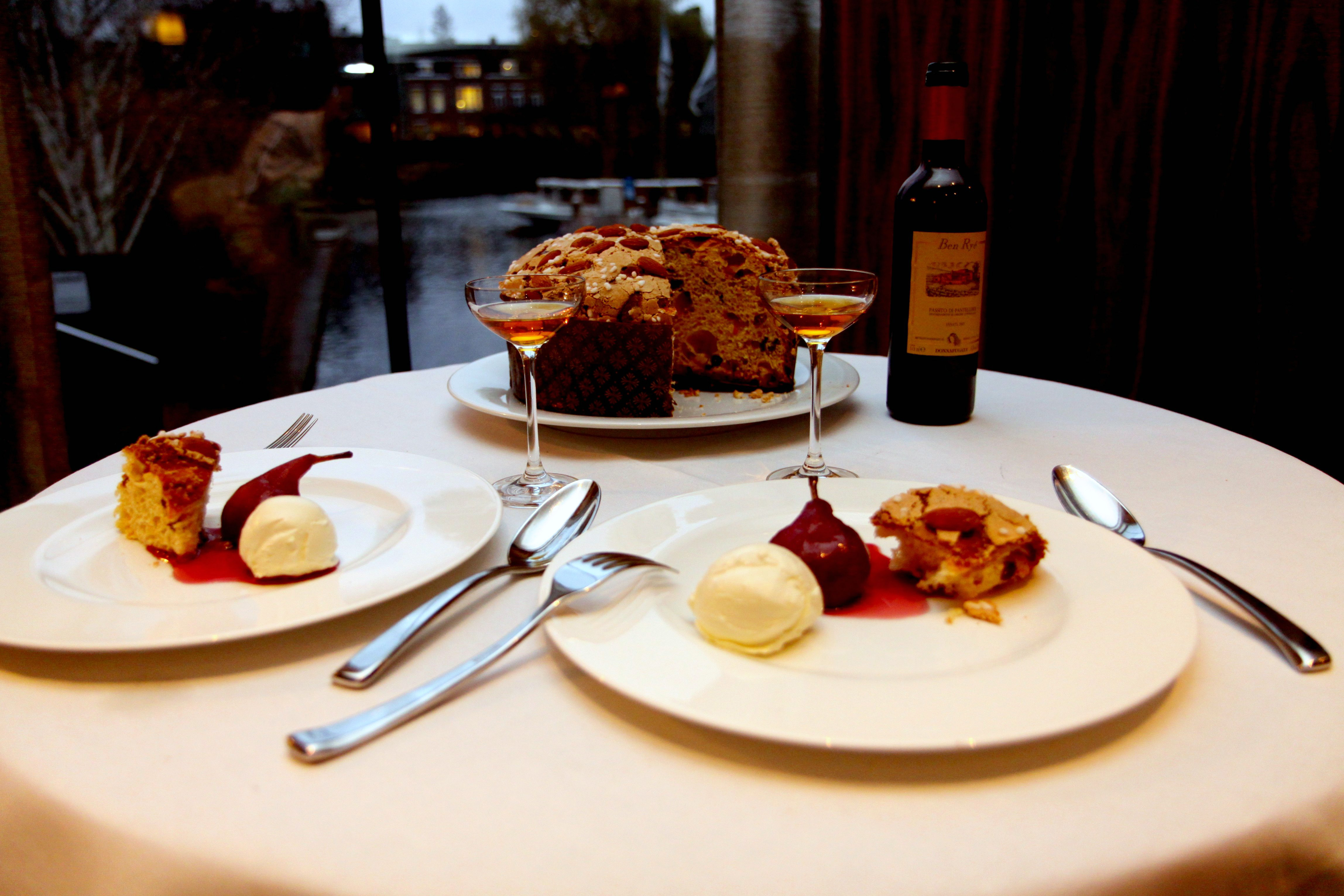
Gelato and panettone

Panettone is served in wedge shapes, vertically cut, accompanied with sweet hot beverages or a sweet wine, such as Asti or Moscato d'Asti. In some regions of Italy, it is served with crema al mascarpone, a cream made by combining eggs, mascarpone, and a sweet liqueur.

Panettone is cooked in a range of sizes, from individually portioned cakes to large cakes that are cut at service. Among the Milanese, panettone is eaten with various courses, including breakfast, afternoon tea, and dinner. Alongside, the Italian dessert wine Vin Santo or a sweet white wine are often drunk. Panettone is sometimes served in its baking paper, which often features decorative designs.

== Industrial panettone ==
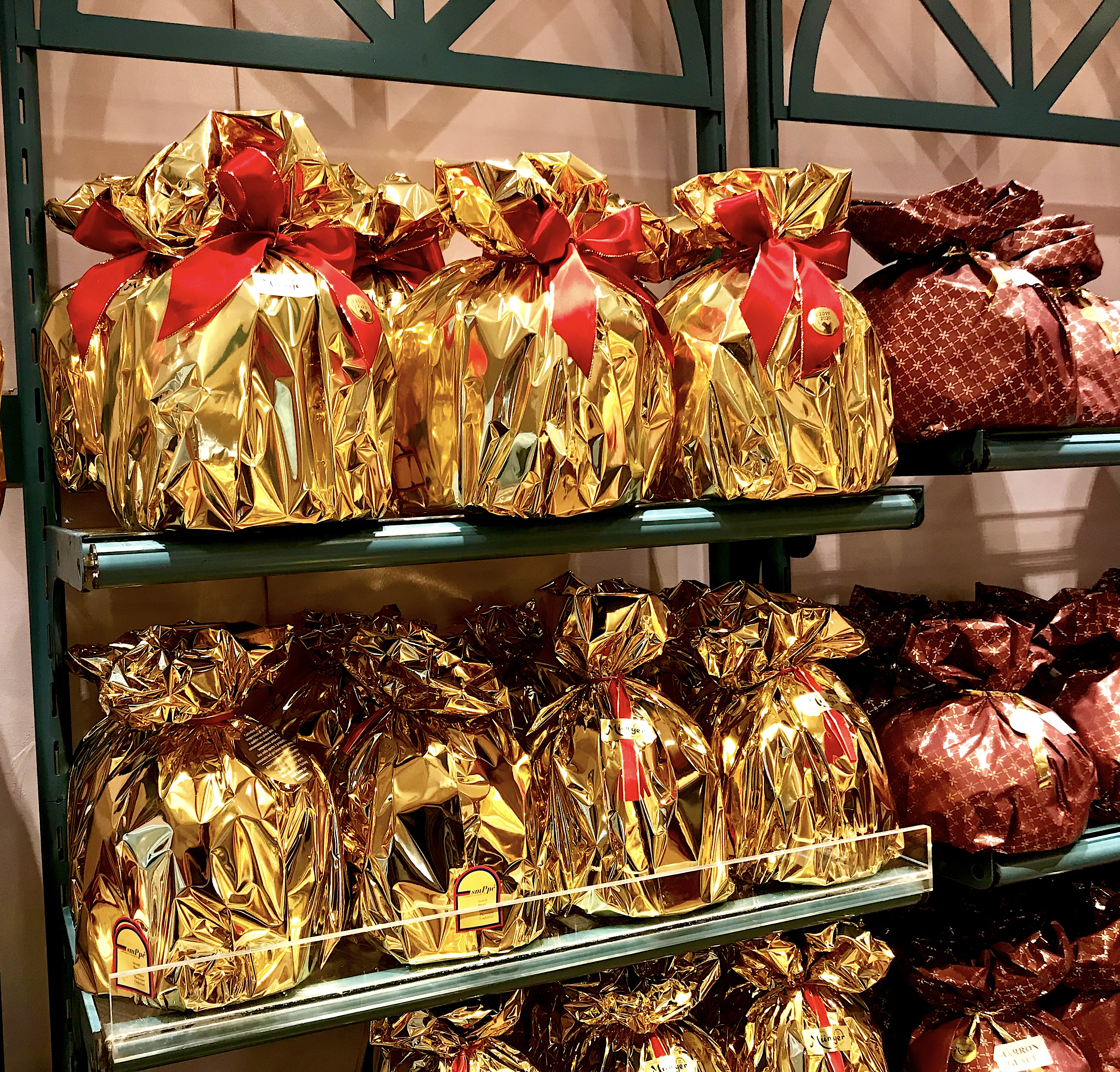
Mass-produced panettone for sale, 2018

Most panettone eaten in Italy is sourced from industrial producers, shrink-wrapped and distributed in cardboard boxes. As of 2007, Italian food manufacturing companies and bakeries produced 117 million panettone and pandoro cakes each Christmas, collectively worth €579 million. As of 2011, Bauli dominated the panettone market after its acquisition of its two largest competitors two years prior.

Prices for panettone varied starkly by source. In 2011, a panettone purchased from an Italian supermarket could cost less than €10 (US$13.92), compared to the few produced by artisans which often could cost €50. Outside of supermarkets, industrially-produced panettone are sold in some bakeries.

== See also ==
- List of Italian desserts and pastries
- Panone

== Sources ==
- Boni, Ada (1969) [1969 in Italian]. Italian Regional Cooking. Translated by Langdale, Maria; Whyte, Ursula. New York: Bonanza Books. ISBN 0-517-023857.
- Davidson, Alan (2014). The Oxford Companion to Food. Oxford University Press. ISBN 978-0-199-67733-7.
- Del Conte, Anna (2006). Amaretto, Apple Cake and Artichokes: The Best of Anna Del Conte. London: Vintage Books. ISBN 978-0-099-49416-4.
- Goldstein, Darra, ed. (2015). The Oxford Companion to Sugar and Sweets. Oxford University Press. ISBN 978-0-19-931339-6.
  - Kaufman, Cathy K. "Christmas". In Goldstein (2015).
  - Reinhart, Peter. "Breads, sweet". In Goldstein (2015).
  - Segan, Francine. "Italy". In Goldstein (2015).
- Krondl, Michael (2011). Sweet Invention: A History of Dessert. Chicago Review Press. ISBN 978-1-55652-954-2.
- Leader, Daniel; Chattman, Lauren (2019). Living Bread: Tradition and Innovation in Artisan Bread Making. New York: Avery Publishing. ISBN 978-0-735-21383-8.
- Levene, Alysa (2016). Cake: The Short, Surprising History of Our Favourite Bakes. London: Headline. ISBN 978-1-4722-2684-6.
- Maffi, Luciano (2019). "The Traveling Priest: Food for the Spirit and Food for the Body". In Bianquis, Isabelle; Williot, Jean-Pierre (eds.). Nomadic Food: Anthropological and Historical Studies around the World. Lanham, Maryland & London: Rowman & Littlefield. ISBN 978-1-5381-1599-2.
- Maltz, Samuel A (1992). Bakery Technology And Engineering (3rd ed.). Springer. ISBN 978-0-442-30855-1.
- Orsini, Joseph (2007). Italian Baking Secrets. New York: Thomas Dunne Books. ISBN 978-0-312-35820-4.
- Paston-Williams, Sara (2012) [1983 as The National Trust Book of Traditional Puddings]. Good Old-Fashioned Puddings. London: National Trust. ISBN 978-1-907-89234-9.
- Pignataro, Luciano (2016). I Dolci Napoletani in 300 Ricette [Neapolitan Desserts in 300 Recipes] (in Italian). Rome: Newton Compton Editori. ISBN 978-8-854-18850-1.
- Presilla, Maricel E. (2012). Gran Cocina Latina: The Food of Latin America. New York & London: W. W. Norton & Company. ISBN 978-0-393-05069-1.
- Quinzio, Jeri (2018). Dessert: A Tale of Happy Endings. London: Reaktion Books. ISBN 978-1-780-23983-5.
- Reinhart, Peter (2016) [2001]. The Bread Baker's Apprentice (15th Anniversary ed.). Berkeley, California: Ten Speed Press. ISBN 978-1-607-74865-6.
- Rinsky, Glenn; Rinsky, Laura Halpin (2009). The Pastry Chef's Companion. Hoboken, New Jersey: John Wiley & Sons. ISBN 978-0-470-00955-0.
- Suas, Michel (2009). Advanced Bread and Pastry: A Professional Approach. Clifton Park, New York: Delamar Cengage Group. ISBN 978-1-4180-1169-7.
- Whitley, Andrew (2009) [2006]. Bread Matters: The State of Modern Bread and a Definitive Guide to Baking Your Own. London: Fourth Estate. ISBN 978-0-00-729849-5.
