= Vincenzo Tanara =

Italian agronomist and gastronome

- Died: 1667
- Known for: Writing L'economia del cittadino in villa
- Scientific career
- Fields: Agriculture

Vincenzo Tanara or Tanari (died 1667) was an Italian agronomist and gastronome.

A Bolognese nobleman, he wrote the important 1653 treatise entitled L'economia del cittadino in villa (The economy of the citizen in the country).

== Career ==
Tanara had established a close friendship with the cardinal Francesco Sforza who had a large library in Bologna. This gave him access to books. He wrote a manuscript on bird hunting, that remained unpublished until the 19th century: La caccia degli uccelli.

In his major work, Tanara wrote of plants in order to provide a guide for "city dwellers." In Botanical Progress, Horticultural Innovation and Cultural Changes, it written that Tanara's "handbooks became very popular among land stewards as landowners were losing their interest in direct management of their estates." Not only did he characterize plant life as central to family economy: he specialized in "utility," particularly agricultural efficiency.
