= Pinza (dessert) =

Italian dessert

- Place of origin: Italy
- Region or state: Veneto

Pinza (pinsa in the Venetian language) or putàna is a dessert flan of the Veneto region of Italy. However, the name pinza also indicates completely different desserts, such as the pinza bolognese or pinza triestina.

== Characterisation ==
The recipe varies from place to place, but its general characteristics can be outlined. The ingredients are simple, typical of the peasant tradition, however today much richer than in the past; they are mixed together white flour, yellow flour, yeast, sugar and milk, with the addition of pine nuts, dried figs, raisins, fennel seeds and grappa. It is paired with red wine, in particular fragolino or mulled wine.

The dessert (which can reach a meter in diameter) is usually consumed during the Christmas holidays and especially on the occasion of the Epiphany and the bonfires at the beginning of the year (le pìroe-paroe or panaìni, panevìni, pignarûl, vècie, casere) and perhaps cooked through them.

The etymology of the word is probably the same as pizza.

== See also ==
- List of Italian desserts and pastries
