= Pinza bolognese =

Italian pastry

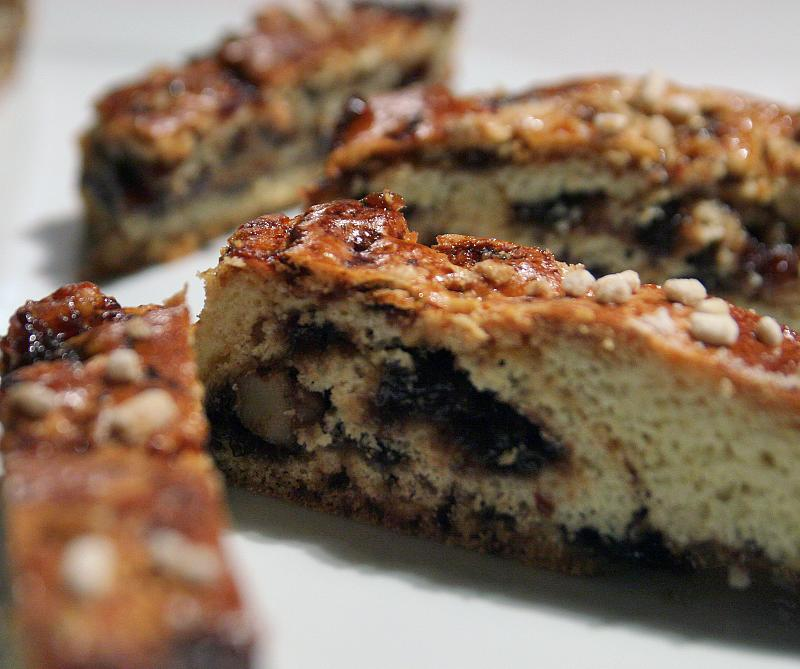
- Place of origin: Italy
- Region or state: Bologna, Emilia-Romagna

Pinza bolognese (pénza in Bolognese dialect) is a dessert that comes from the Bolognese peasant tradition, which was generally prepared during the Christmas holidays, although it is now consumed all year round. The recipe appears for the first time in 1644 in the volume L'economia del cittadino in villa by Vincenzo Tanara.

The name most probably derives from its shape, as it looks like a roll of dough that holds the mostarda bolognese (a sweet fruit jam, not the mustard-flavored mostarda di Cremona) inside it.

Of a class of baked goods called torte da credenza in Italy, pinza bolognese stores well without refrigeration.

== See also ==
Pinza Mostarda Bolognese at the Wikibooks Cookbook subproject

- List of Italian desserts and pastries
- Pinza
