= Pinca =

Variety of Easter bread

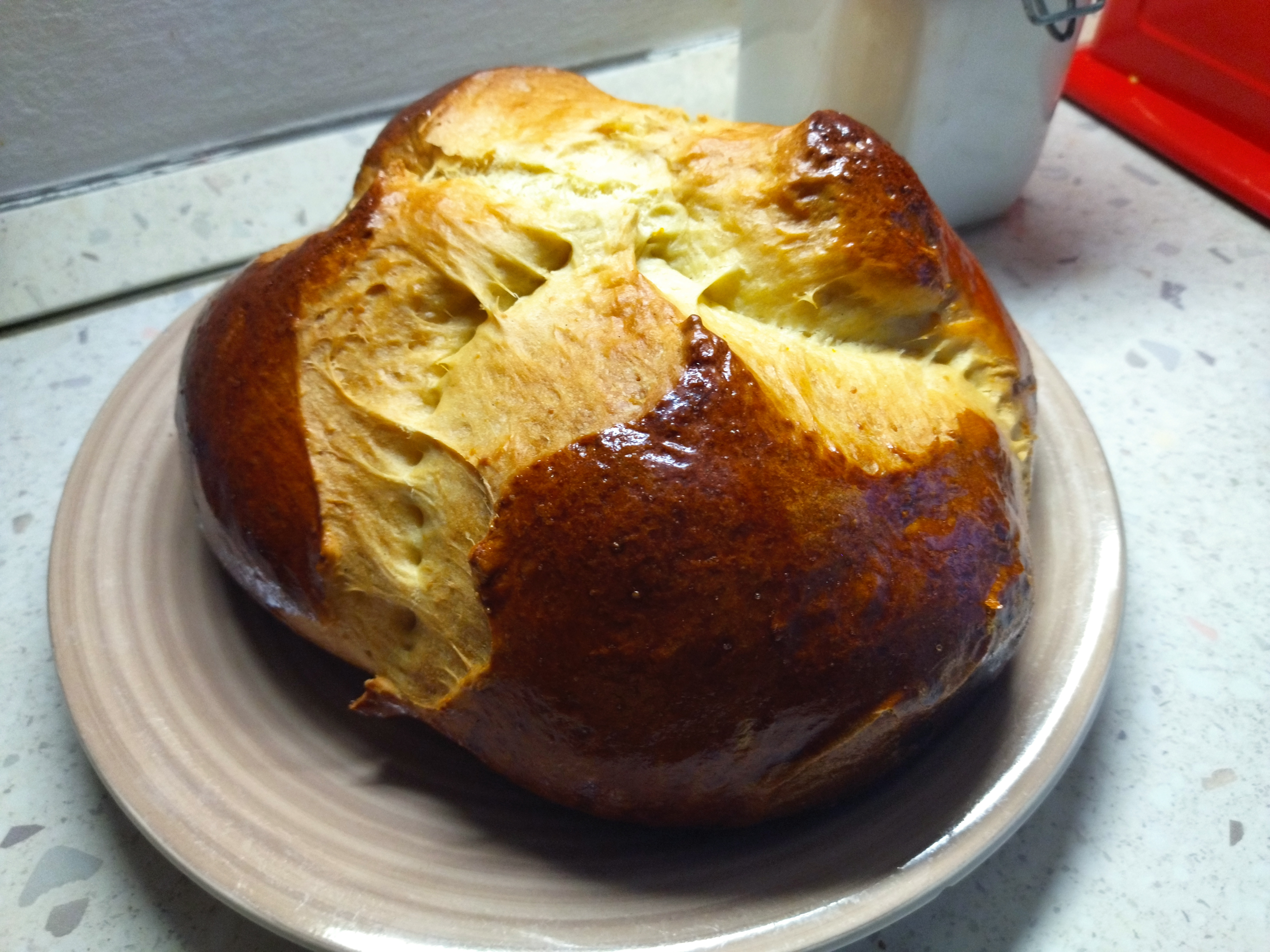
- Alternative names: Osterpinze, sirnica, pinza
- Type: Sweet roll
- Place of origin: Croatia, Montenegro, Slovenia, Italy
- Region or state: Dalmatia, Bay of Kotor, Istria, Gorizia, Trieste
- Main ingredients: Flour, yeast, raisins, zest
- Variations: Titola, pupa, colomba, and jajarica

Pinca (also pogača, sirnica or pinza or Osterpinze) is a variety of Easter bread native to Italy, Croatia, Slovenia and Austria. It is particularly popular in Istria, western Croatia, in parts of the Province of Trieste, and the historical region of Dalmatia, the Goriška region of Slovenia, the Slovenian Littoral, southern Austria and Gorizia of Italy.

In Italy, it is called pinza triestina to distinguish it from Venetian pinza and pinza bolognese.

== Description ==
It is a sweet bread loaf with the sign of a cross, which is carved in with a knife before baking, on the upper side.

== Usage ==
Pinca is eaten to celebrate the end of Lent, because it contains many eggs. Together with Easter eggs, pinca has remained the centrepiece of the family Easter breakfast in areas where it is eaten. In urban areas it is increasingly the only item taken to Easter Mass for blessing, and is often given to guests as a symbol of good wishes.
