= Pastiera =

Neapolitan tart

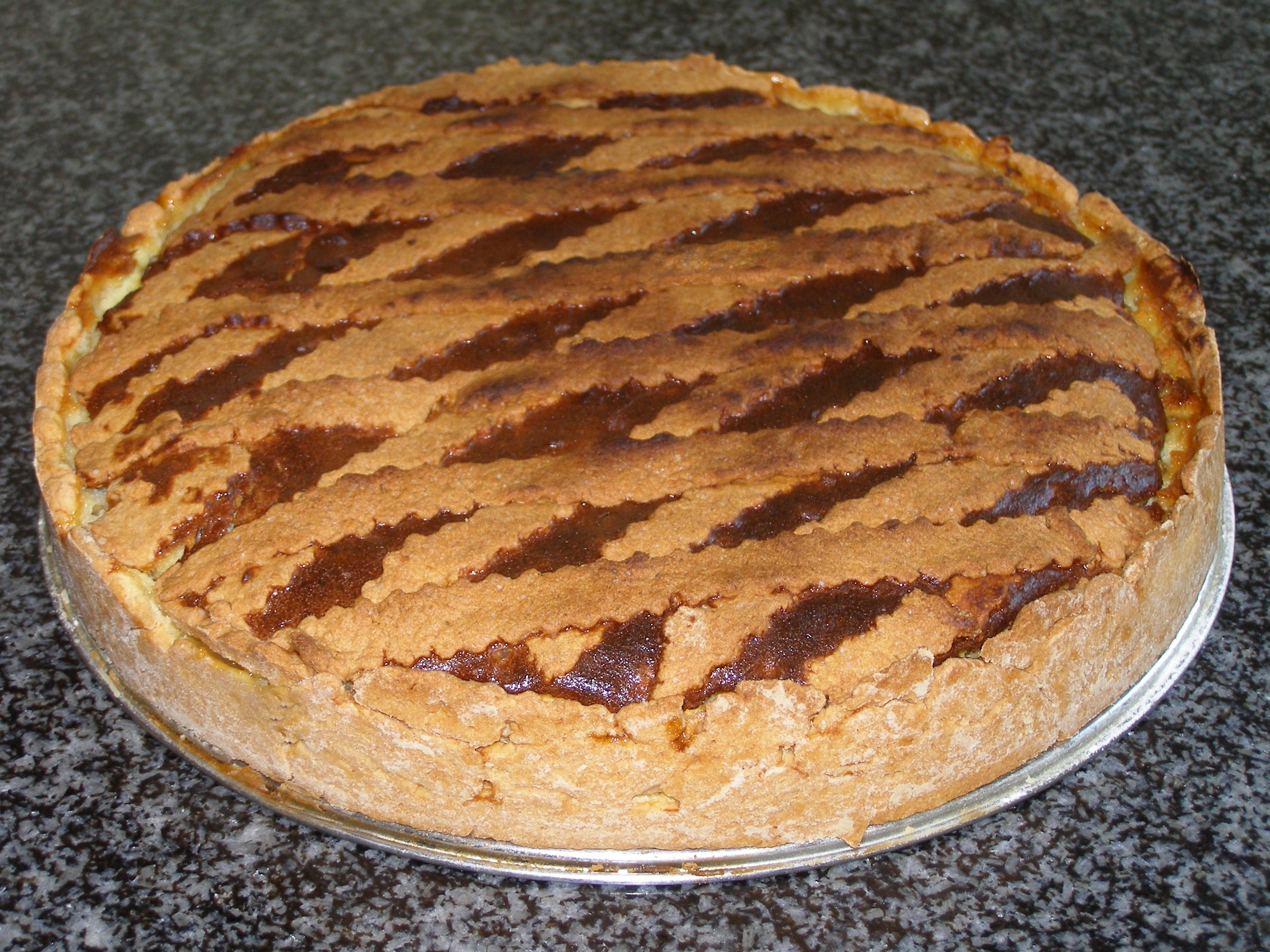
- Type: Tart
- Place of origin: Italy
- Region or state: Naples
- Main ingredients: Flour, sugar, lard, eggs, ricotta, boiled wheat (in milk), water of orange flowers

Pastiera (Italian: [paˈstjɛːra]; Neapolitan: [paˈstjeːrə]) or pastiera napoletana is a type of Neapolitan tart made with cooked wheat, eggs and ricotta cheese, and flavored with orange flower water. It is usually eaten at Easter.

== Legends ==
Various writers repeat legends about the origin of pastiera. One story connects it to the siren Parthenope, whom the Neapolitans thanked for her sweet singing by giving her ricotta, flour, eggs, milk, spices and sugar; Parthenope gave these ingredients to the gods, who made pastiera out of it. Another story connects it to a spring celebration of the goddess Ceres.

== Origins and tradition ==
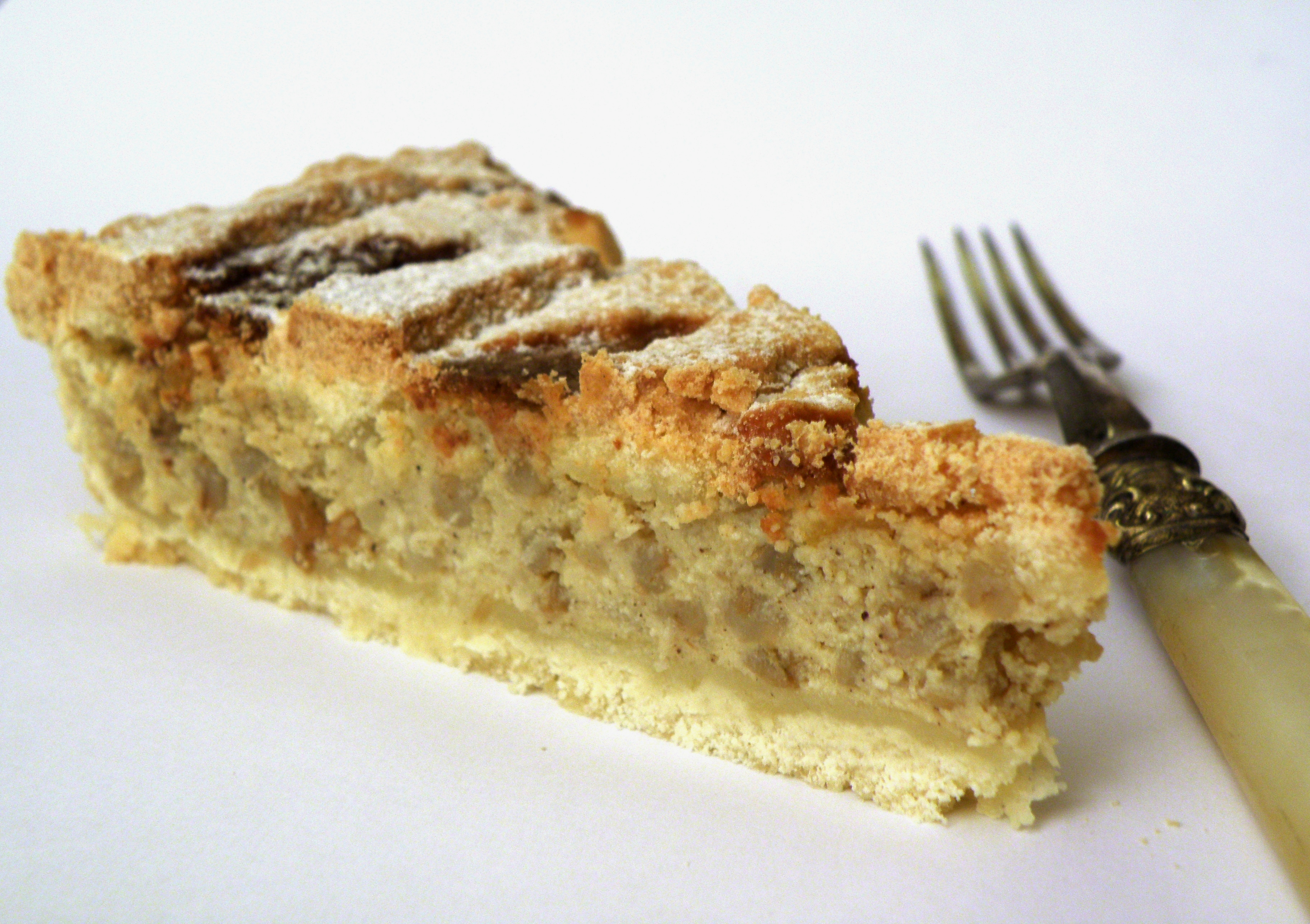
A slice of pastiera

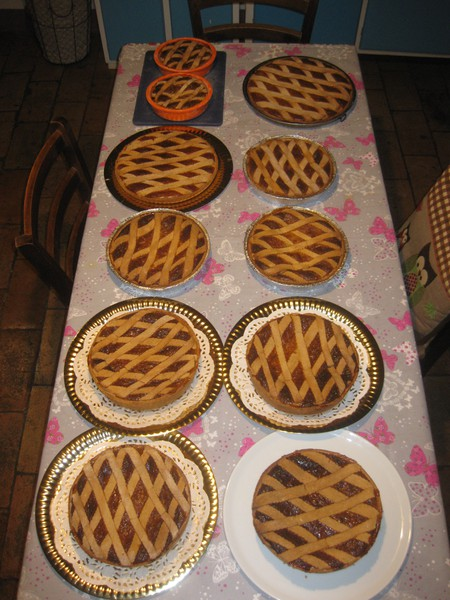
Pastiere prepared for Easter

The modern pastiera was probably invented in a Neapolitan convent. The tale goes that unknown nun wanted that cake, symbol of the resurrection, to have the perfume of the flowers of the orange trees which grew in the convent's gardens. She mixed a handful of wheat to the white ricotta cheese, then she added some eggs, symbol of the new life, some water which had the fragrance of the flowers of the spring time, candied citron and aromatic spices.

Lore has it that the nuns of the ancient convent of San Gregorio Armeno used to prepare a great quantity of the pie for the rich families during Easter time.

There are two different ways of preparing pastiera: in the older, the ricotta is mixed with the eggs or with the grain; in the newer, thick pastry cream is added, making the pastiera softer. This innovation was introduced by Starace, a Neapolitan confectioner with a shop in a corner in Piazza Municipio ('Town Hall Square').

The pastiera has to be cooked some days in advance, no later than Maundy Thursday or Good Friday, in order to allow the fragrances to mix properly and result in that unique flavor. The pastiera is not only cooked but also sold and served in appropriate pans called ruoti because it is very fragile, so it would easily crumble up if removed from the ruoto.

== The savory variant ==
The savory Neapolitan pastiera is a variant of the sweet one. The recipe differs from that of the sweet pastiera for the dough based on pre-cooked wheat and the filling obtained from the union of sausages and cheeses (the most typical are Neapolitan salami and caciocavallo). In some variants the use of brisé dough and puff pastry is preferred.

== See also ==
- Neapolitan cuisine
- List of Italian desserts and pastries

== Bibliography ==
- Francesconi, Carola Jeanne (1995). La vera cucina di Napoli (in Italian). Roma: Newton. pp. 258–60. ISBN 8881830213.
