= Ciauscolo =

Variety of Italian salame

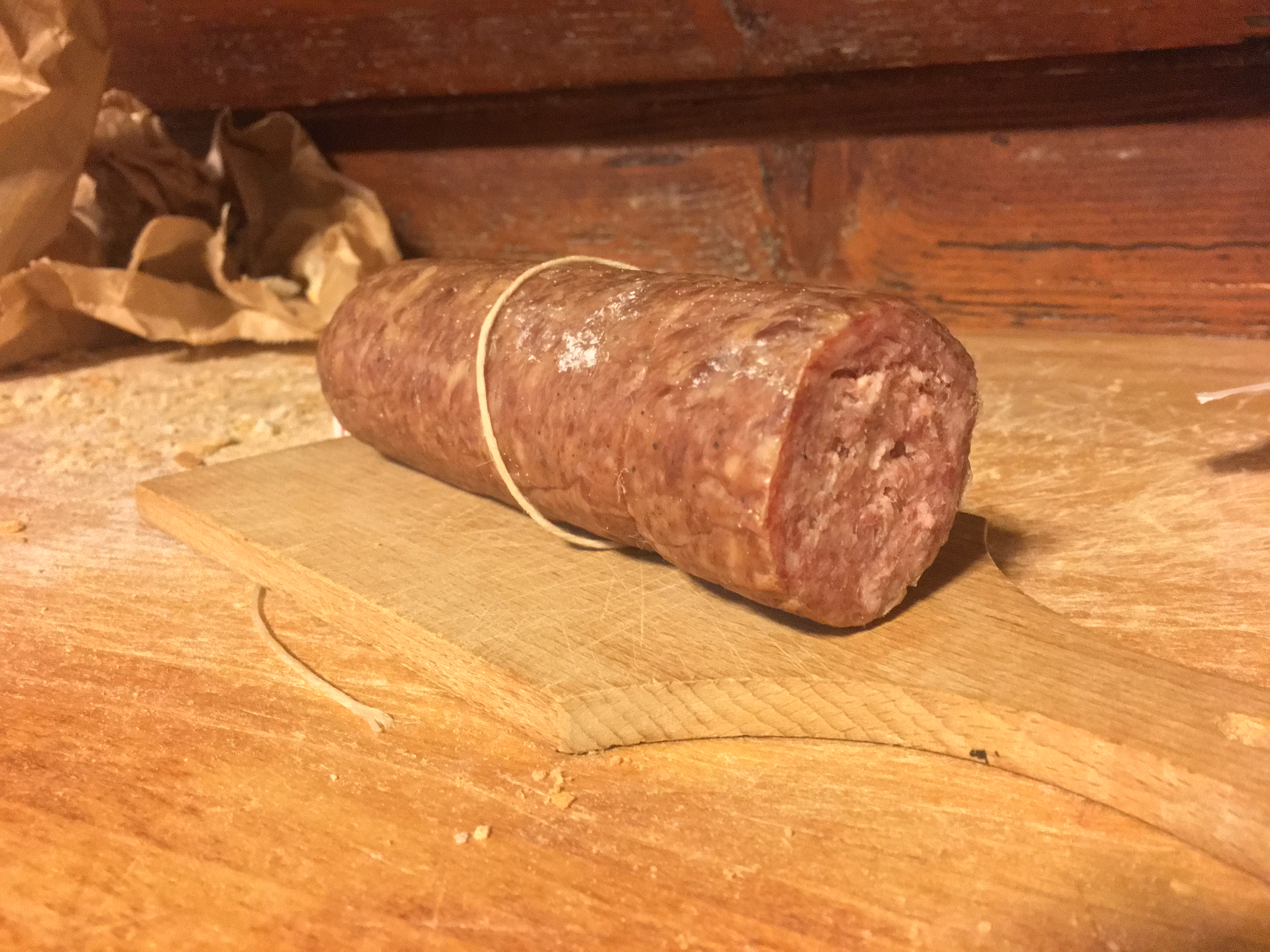
- Salame ciauscolo
- Alternative names: Ciavuscolo
- Place of origin: Italy
- Region or state: Marche
- Main ingredients: Pork
- Ingredients generally used: Black pepper, garlic, white wine

Ciauscolo (Italian: [tʃaˈuskolo]; sometimes also spelled ciavuscolo or ciabuscolo) is a variety of Italian salume, typical of the Marche region (especially in the province of Macerata), although it is also widely used in nearby Umbria (especially in the territory of Foligno and part of northern Valnerina).

== Etymology ==
The word ciauscolo is related to the local dialectal word ciausculu, although which one derives from the other remains unclear. A possible origin for ciauscolo is the Medieval Latin word cibusculum, meaning 'small food'.

== Preparation ==
Ciauscolo is a smoked and dry-cured sausage, made from pork meat and fat cut from the shoulder and belly. It is spiced with black pepper and garlic, and white wine. The meat is finely ground, mixed with the spices and cure, stuffed into wide hog middles, and left for a 12- to 24-hour drying period. Once the surface has become tacky, the sausage is cold-smoked over juniper branches for two days, then hung to cure. Although it can be aged for a month or more, it is typically eaten after only a brief two weeks. The result is a very soft, moist sausage which can be spread on bread, in a manner similar to some pâtés.

Ciauscolo gained protected geographical indication status in 2009.

A variant in some parts of Marche is called ciauscolo di fegato, mazzafegato or fegatino, in which pork liver is substituted for a certain portion of the fat. This naturally causes the color of the sausage to become darker, and contributes an intense flavor. In this case, orange zest and fennel fronds or flowers are included in the spices.

== See also ==
- List of smoked foods
