= Pinsa (bread) =

Italian flatbread variant

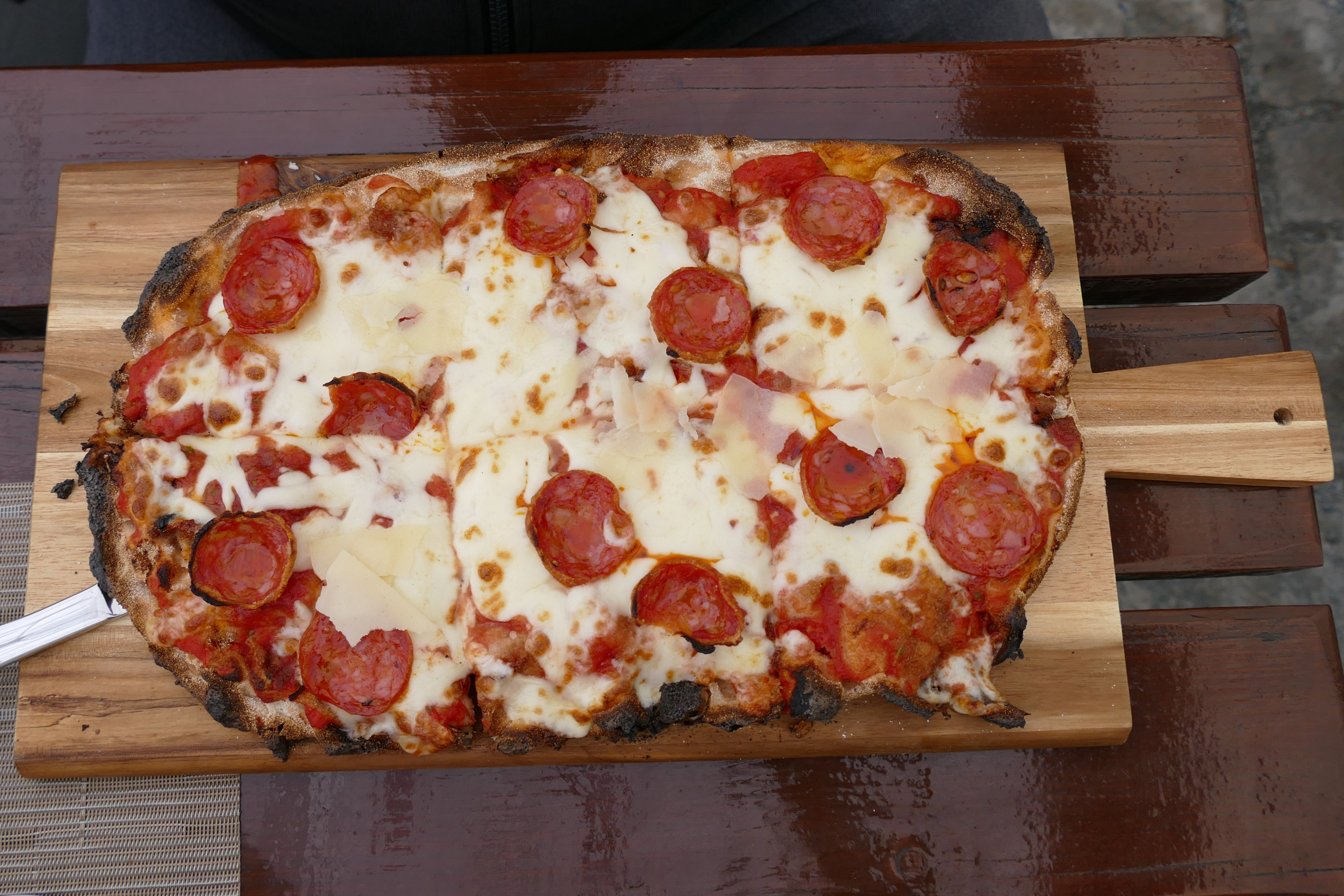
Pinsa

Pinsa, also known as pinsa romana, is a flatbread generally marketed as an oval-shaped style of, or healthier alternative to, pizza. The name originated partly as a marketing strategy, coined by a Rome-based baking family as late as 2001.

== History ==
Pinsa originated from an idea by the Italian entrepreneur Corrado Di Marco, who registered the trademark pinsa romana in 2001. As early as 1981, the company led by Di Marco, based in Guidonia Montecelio, north-east of Rome, had added the tray-baked dough—later called pinsa—to its product range. As a marketing strategy, Di Marco later admitted to fabricating a non-existent historical connection to ancient Rome in order to better promote the product.

The name pinsa was chosen to evoke the Latin verb pinsere ('to pound' or 'to crush'). Additionally, during the naming process, similarity to the terms pizza and pita was desired. With the product's success, the invented ancient Roman origins were uncritically adopted and disseminated by the media.

== Characteristics ==
The dough is made from a mixture of different types of flour (wheat, soy, and rice), sourdough, yeast, salt, optionally oil, and cold water. Before baking, the dough is full of air pockets, resulting in a light and crispy exterior with a soft interior after baking. The sourdough is intended to improve digestibility.
