= Panone =

Italian Christmas cake

- Type: Cake
- Place of origin: Italy
- Region or state: Emilia-Romagna

Panone (in Bolognese dialect panón) is an Italian Christmas cake typical of the Bologna area of the Emilia-Romagna region, in particular of the comune (municipality) of Molinella (panone di Molinella).

== See also ==
- List of Italian desserts and pastries
