= Paschal greeting =

Easter custom

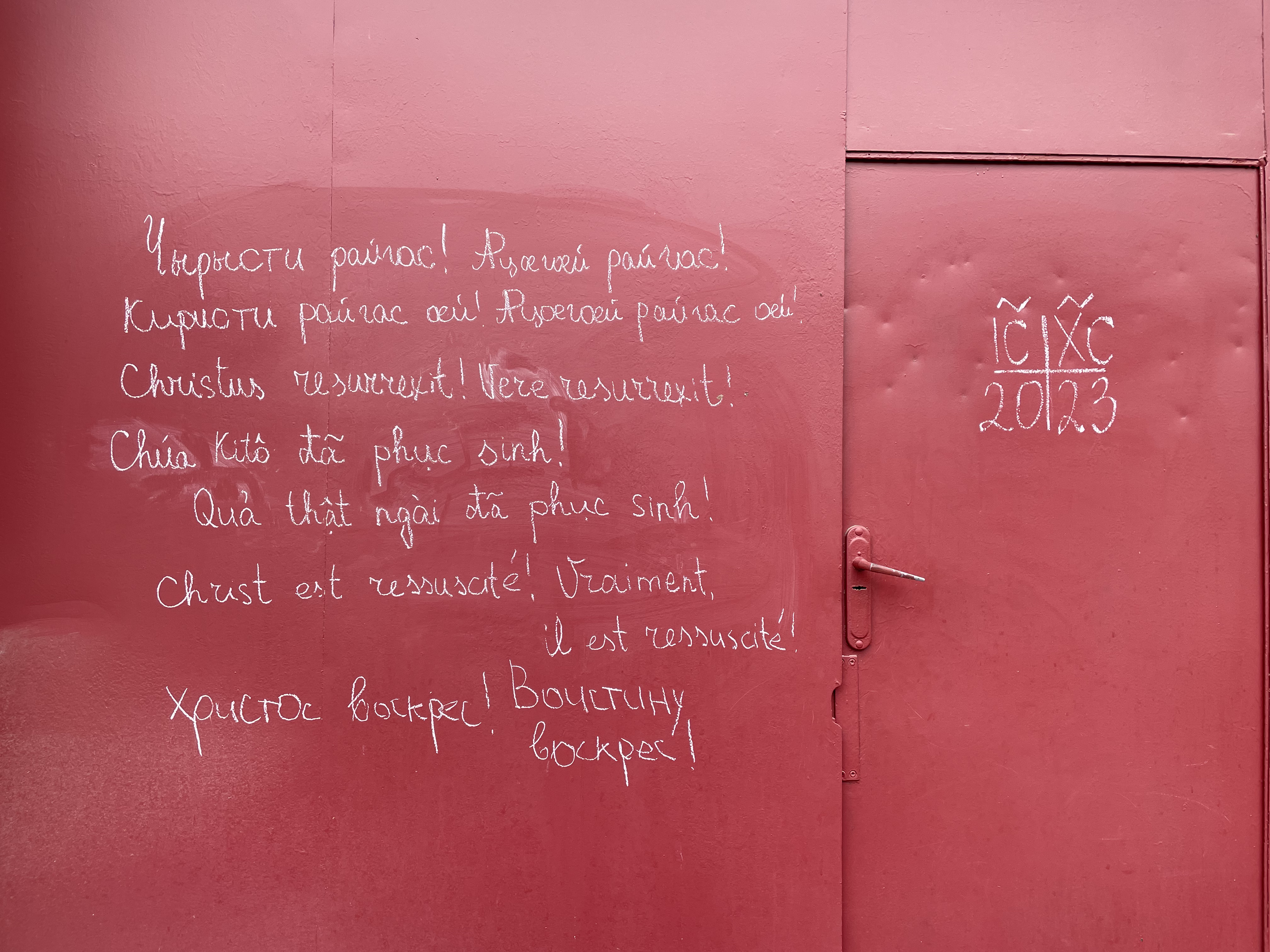
The inscription "Christ is Risen" in various languages (from top to bottom): in Ossetian (Iron and Digor dialects), Latin, Vietnamese, French and Russian. Vladikavkaz, North Ossetia, Russia

The Paschal greeting, also known as the Easter Acclamation or Easter Greeting, is an Easter (Pascha) custom among many Christian churches, including Eastern Orthodox, Oriental Orthodox, Roman Catholic, Anglican, Lutheran, Methodist, Presbyterian, and Congregational. One offers the greeting "Christ is risen!", and the response is "Indeed he is risen!" or "He is risen indeed!", with many variants in English and other languages (compare Matthew 27:64, 28:6–7; Mark 16:6; Luke 24:6, 24:34).

== Theories on origin ==
Credits for the origin of the greeting vary. However, the phrase "Christ is risen" is likely a shortened piece from Matthew 28:5-6, "The angel said to the women, 'Do not be afraid, for I know that you are looking for Jesus, who was crucified. He is not here; he has risen, just as he said. Come and see the place where he lay.'"

There is no consensus on the source of the response "He is risen indeed". Some believe that it comes from Luke 24:33-34 "There they found the Eleven and those with them, assembled together and saying, 'It is true! The Lord has risen and has appeared to Simon.'" Regardless of the initial source, the phrase has become part of the Christian tradition. The greeting is used by many to celebrate the belief in the resurrection of Jesus Christ on Easter morning.

== Examples ==
It is used among members of some Christian denominations when meeting one another during Eastertide; some even text or answer their phones with the phrase.

=== Eastern Christianity ===
In Eastern Orthodoxy and some Eastern rites of Catholicism, the greeting and reply are:

Christ is Risen! – Truly He is Risen!

- In the original language, Greek: Χριστὸς ἀνέστη! – Ἀληθῶς ἀνέστη!, romanized: Khristòs anésti! – Alithōs anésti!
- In the most widely-used language, Church Slavonic: Хрїсто́съ воскре́се! – Вои́стинꙋ воскре́се!, romanized: Khristósŭ voskrése! – Voístinu voskrése!

A list in 57 languages is found at the website of the Orthodox Church in America.

In some cultures, such as in Russia and Serbia, it is also customary to exchange a triple kiss of peace on alternating cheeks after the greeting.

=== Western Christianity ===
In the Latin Church, the traditional greeting on Easter morning and throughout the Easter Octave is: Christus surréxit! - Surréxit vere, allelúja (“Christ is risen!” - “He is risen indeed, Alleluia!”). This ancient phrase is similar to the Greek one, and echoes the greeting of the angel to Mary Magdalene and Mary, the mother of James, as they arrived at the sepulchre to anoint the body of Jesus: "He is not here; for he has risen, as he said" (Matthew 28:6).
