= Easter =

Commemoration of the resurrection of Jesus Christ

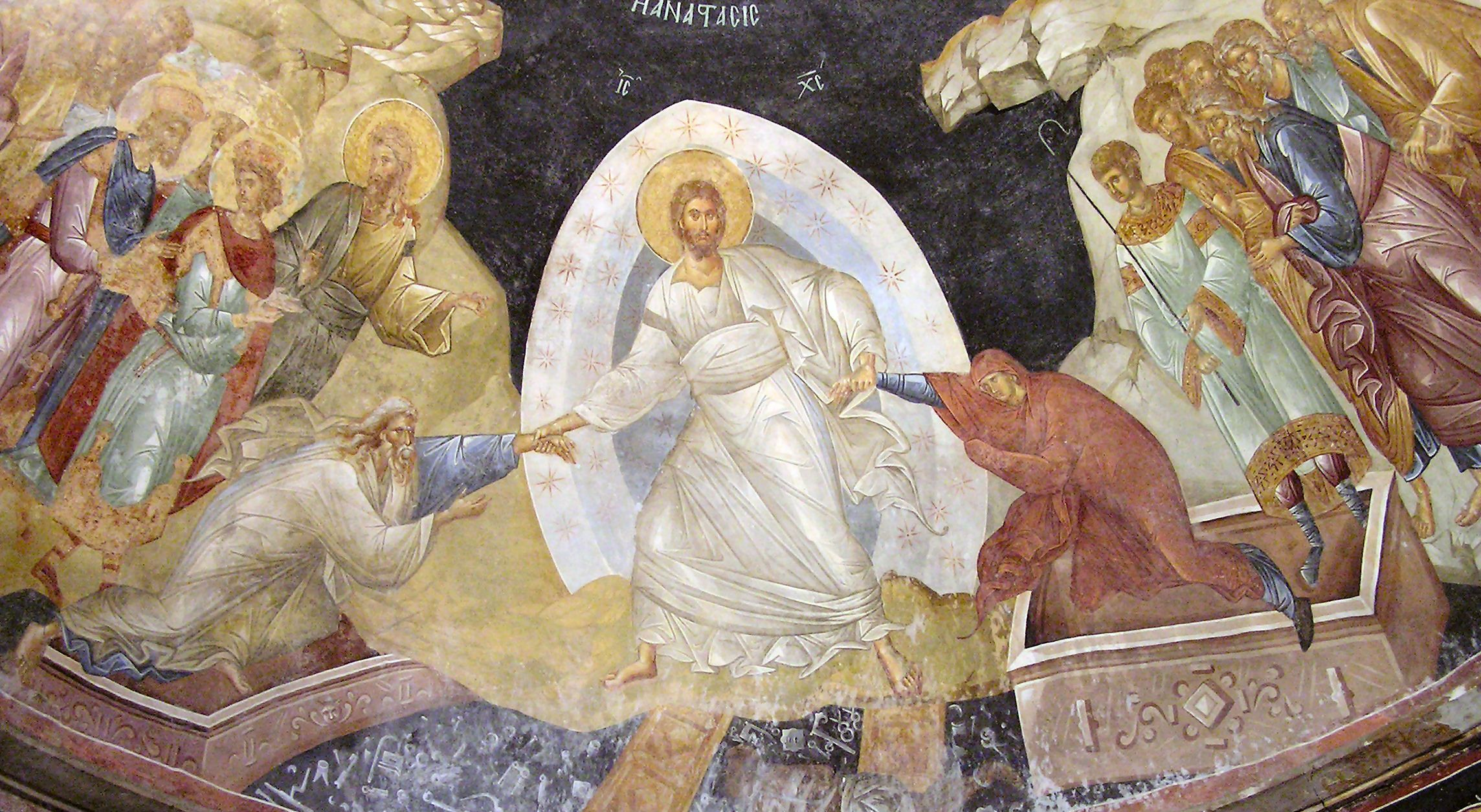
- Having destroyed the gates of Hell, Jesus Christ is depicted flanked by saints, raising Adam and Eve from their graves and trampling death. Fresco of the resurrection at The Chora (c. 1315)
- Observed by: Christians; Alawites
- Type: Christian, cultural
- Significance: Celebrates the resurrection of Jesus Christ
- Celebrations: Church services, festive family meals, Easter egg decoration, and gift-giving
- Observances: All-night vigil, sunrise service
- Date: Variable, determined by the Computus
- 2025 date: April 20 (Western); April 20 (Eastern)
- 2026 date: April 5 (Western); April 12 (Eastern)
- 2027 date: March 28 (Western); May 2 (Eastern)
- 2028 date: April 16 (Western); April 16 (Eastern)
- Related to: Septuagesima, Sexagesima, Quinquagesima, Shrove Tuesday, Ash Wednesday, Clean Monday, Lent, Great Lent, Friday of Sorrows, Palm Sunday, Holy Week, Maundy Thursday, Good Friday, and Holy Saturday which lead up to Easter; and Divine Mercy Sunday, Ascension, Pentecost, Trinity Sunday, Corpus Christi, and Feast of the Sacred Heart, which follow it.

Easter, (Note: Other traditional names for the feast in English are "Easter Day", as in the Book of Common Prayer, and "Easter Sunday", used by James Ussher) and Samuel Pepys).) also called Pasch (/pæsk/) or Pascha (Note: Derived from Latin. Imperial Aramaic: פַּסְחָא, romanized: pasḥā; Ancient Greek: πάσχα, romanized: páskha. In the Eastern Orthodox Church, the Greek word Pascha is used for the celebration; in English, the analogous word is Pasch.) or Resurrection Sunday, (Note: The term "Resurrection Sunday" is used particularly by Christian communities in the Middle East.) is a Christian celebration and cultural holiday commemorating the resurrection of Jesus from the dead, described in the Bible's New Testament as having occurred on the third day of his burial following his crucifixion by the Romans at Calvary c. 30 AD. It is the culmination of the Passion of Jesus, preceded by Lent (or Great Lent), a 40-day period of fasting, prayer, and penance.

Easter-observing Christians commonly refer to the last week of Lent, before Easter, as Holy Week. In Western Christian denominations that observe the liturgical calendar, Holy Week begins on Palm Sunday (marking the entrance of Jesus in Jerusalem), includes Spy Wednesday (on which the betrayal of Jesus is mourned), and contains the days of the Easter Triduum including Maundy Thursday, commemorating the Maundy and Last Supper, as well as Good Friday, commemorating the crucifixion and death of Jesus. In Eastern Christianity, the same events are commemorated with the names of days all starting with "Holy" or "Holy and Great", and Easter itself might be called Great and Holy Pascha. In both Western and Eastern Christianity, Eastertide—also known as the Easter or Paschal season—begins on Easter Sunday and continues for seven weeks, concluding on the 50th day, Pentecost Sunday. However, in Eastern Christianity, the leavetaking of the feast occurs on the 39th day, the eve of the Feast of the Ascension.

Easter and its related holidays are moveable feasts, not falling on a fixed date; its date is computed based on a lunisolar calendar (solar year plus Moon phase) similar to the Hebrew calendar, generating a number of controversies. The First Council of Nicaea (325) established common Paschal observance by all Christians on the first Sunday after the first full moon on or after the vernal equinox. Even if calculated on the basis of the Gregorian calendar, the date of that full moon sometimes differs from that of the astronomical first full moon after the March equinox.

Easter is linked to the Jewish Passover by its name (Hebrew: פֶּסַח, pesach; Imperial Aramaic: פָּסחָא, romanized: pascha; whence the term Pascha), by its origin (according to the synoptic Gospels, both the crucifixion and the resurrection took place during the week of Passover) and by much of its symbolism, as well as by its position in the calendar. In most European languages, both the Christian Easter and the Jewish Passover are called by the same name; and in the older English translations of the Bible, as well, the term Easter was used to translate Passover. The English term may derive from the Anglo-Saxon goddess name Ēostre.

Easter traditions vary across the Christian world, and include sunrise services or late-night vigils, exclamations and exchanges of Paschal greetings, flowering the cross, the wearing of Easter bonnets by women, clipping the church, and the decoration and the communal breaking of Easter eggs (a symbol of the empty tomb). The Easter lily, a symbol of the resurrection in Western Christianity, traditionally decorates the chancel area of churches on this day and for the rest of Eastertide. In addition to the viewing of Passion Plays during Lent and Easter, many television channels air films related to the resurrection, such as The Passion of the Christ, The Greatest Story Ever Told and The Jesus Film. Additional customs that have become associated with Easter and are observed by both Christians and some non-Christians include Easter parades, communal dancing (Eastern Europe), the Easter Bunny and egg hunting. There are also traditional Easter foods that vary by region and culture.

== Etymology ==
The modern English term Easter, cognate with German Ostern, developed from an Old English word that usually appears in the form Ēastrun, Ēastron, or Ēastran; but also as Ēastru, Ēastro; and Ēastre or Ēostre. (Note: Old English pronunciation: [ˈæːɑstre, ˈeːostre].) In the 8th century AD, Anglo-Saxon monk and scholar Bede recorded in his The Reckoning of Time that Ēosturmōnaþ (Old English for 'Month of Ēostre', translated in Bede's time as "Paschal month") was an English month, corresponding to April, which he says "was once called after a goddess of theirs named Ēostre, in whose honour feasts were celebrated in that month".

In Latin and Greek, the Christian celebration was, and still is, called Pascha (Greek: Πάσχα), a word derived from Aramaic פסחא (Paskha), cognate to the Hebrew פֶּסַח (Pesach). The word originally denoted the Jewish festival known in English as Passover, commemorating the Israelite Exodus from slavery in Egypt. As early as 50 AD, Paul the Apostle, writing from Ephesus to the Christians in Corinth, applied the term to Christ. It is unlikely that the Ephesian and Corinthian Christians were the first to hear Exodus 12 interpreted as speaking about the death of Jesus, not just about the Jewish Passover ritual. In most languages, the feast is known by names derived from the Greek and Latin Pascha. Pascha is also a name by which Jesus himself is remembered in the Orthodox Church, especially in connection with his resurrection and with the season of its celebration. Others call the holiday "Resurrection Sunday" or "Resurrection Day", after the Greek Ancient Greek: Ἀνάστασις (Anastasis, 'Resurrection').

== Theological significance ==
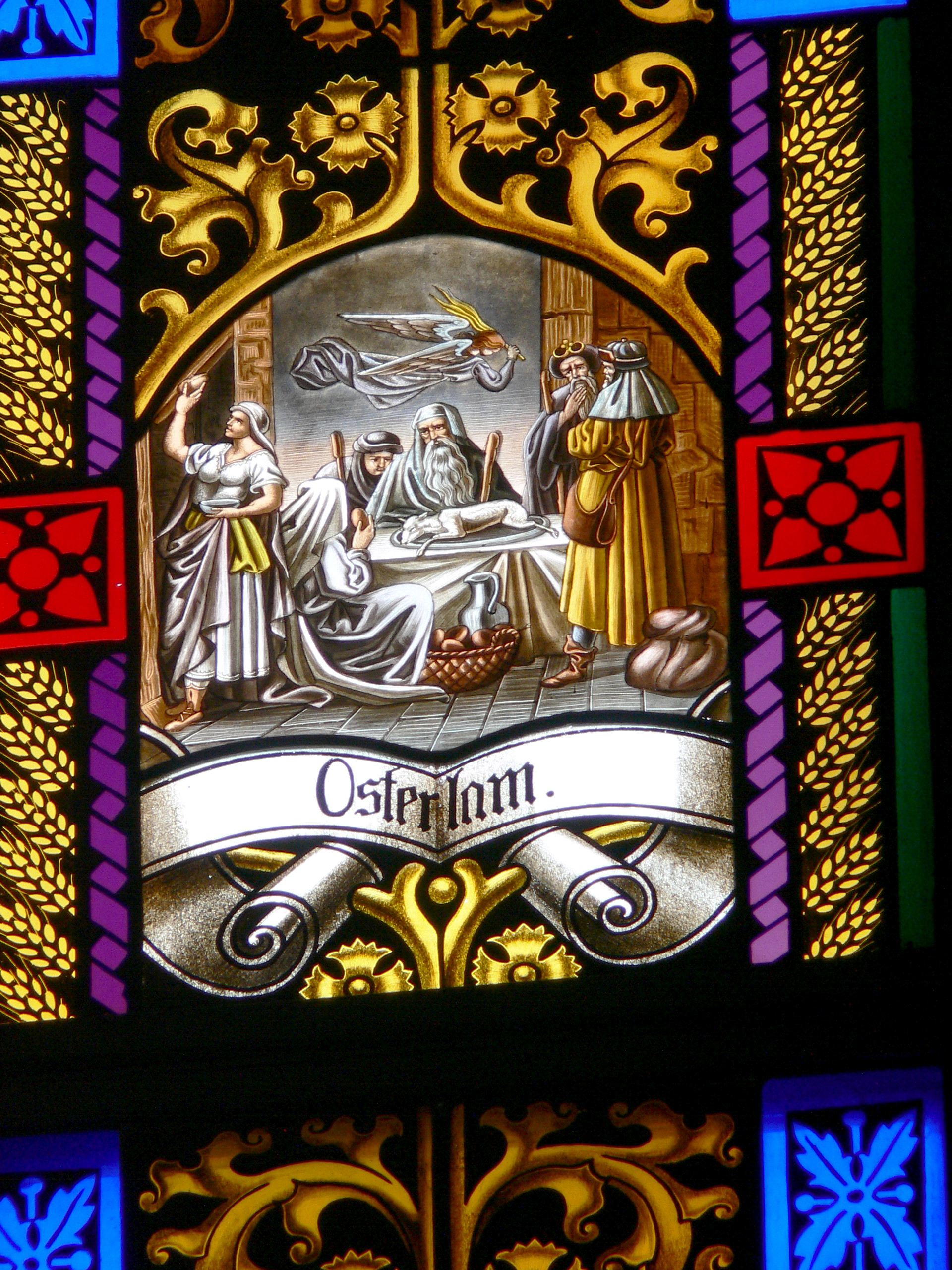
A stained-glass window depicting the Passover Lamb, a concept integral to the foundation of Easter

Easter celebrates Jesus' supernatural resurrection from the dead, which is one of the chief tenets of the Christian faith. Paul writes that, for those who trust in Jesus' death and resurrection, "death is swallowed up in victory". The First Epistle of Peter declares that God has given believers "a new birth into a living hope through the resurrection of Jesus Christ from the dead". Christian theology holds that, through faith in the working of God, those who follow Jesus are spiritually resurrected with him so that they may walk in a new way of life and receive eternal salvation, and can hope to be physically resurrected to dwell with him in the Kingdom of Heaven.

Easter is linked to Passover and the Exodus from Egypt recorded in the Old Testament through the Last Supper, sufferings, and crucifixion of Jesus that preceded the resurrection. According to the three synoptic Gospels, Jesus gave the Passover meal a new meaning, as in the upper room during the Last Supper he prepared himself and his disciples for his death. He identified the bread and cup of wine as his body, soon to be sacrificed, and his blood, soon to be shed. Paul states in his First Epistle to the Corinthians: "Get rid of the old yeast that you may be a new batch without yeast—as you really are. For Christ, our Passover lamb, has been sacrificed." This refers to the requirement in Jewish law that Jews eliminate all chametz, or leavening, from their homes in advance of Passover, and to the allegory of Jesus as the Passover lamb.

== Early Christianity ==
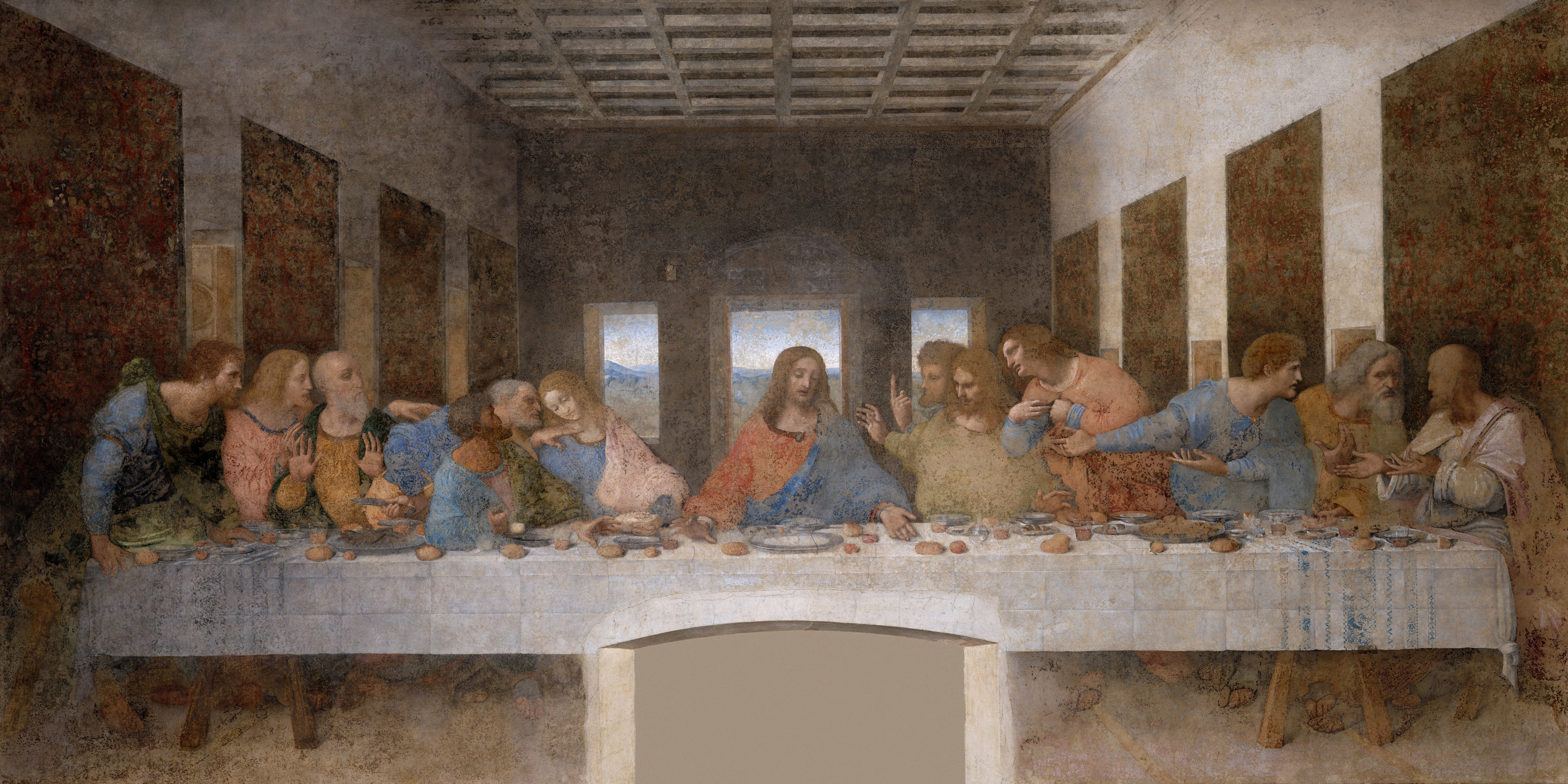
The Last Supper (1495–1498). Mural, tempera on gesso, pitch and mastic, 700 x 880 cm (22.9 x 28.8 ft). In the Santa Maria delle Grazie Church, Milan, Italy, it is Leonardo da Vinci's dramatic interpretation of Jesus' last meal before death. The Last Supper celebrated by Jesus and his disciples. The early Christians, too, would have celebrated this meal to commemorate Jesus's death and subsequent resurrection.

As the Gospels assert that both the crucifixion and resurrection of Jesus occurred during the week of Passover, the first Christians timed the observance of the annual celebration of the resurrection in relation to Passover. Direct evidence for a more fully formed Christian festival of Pascha (Easter) begins to appear in the mid-2nd century. Perhaps the earliest extant primary source referring to Easter is a mid-2nd-century Paschal homily attributed to Melito of Sardis, which characterizes the celebration as a well-established one. Evidence for another kind of annually recurring Christian festival, those commemorating the martyrs, began to appear at about the same time as the above homily.

While martyrs' days (usually the individual dates of martyrdom) were celebrated on fixed dates in the local solar calendar, the date of Easter was fixed by means of the local Jewish lunisolar calendar. This is consistent with the celebration of Easter having entered Christianity during its earliest, Jewish period.

== Date ==
Easter and holidays related to it are moveable feasts, in that they do not fall on a fixed date in the Gregorian or Julian calendars (both of which follow the cycle of the sun and the seasons). Instead, the date for Easter is determined on a lunisolar calendar similar to the Hebrew calendar.

=== Early Church controversies ===
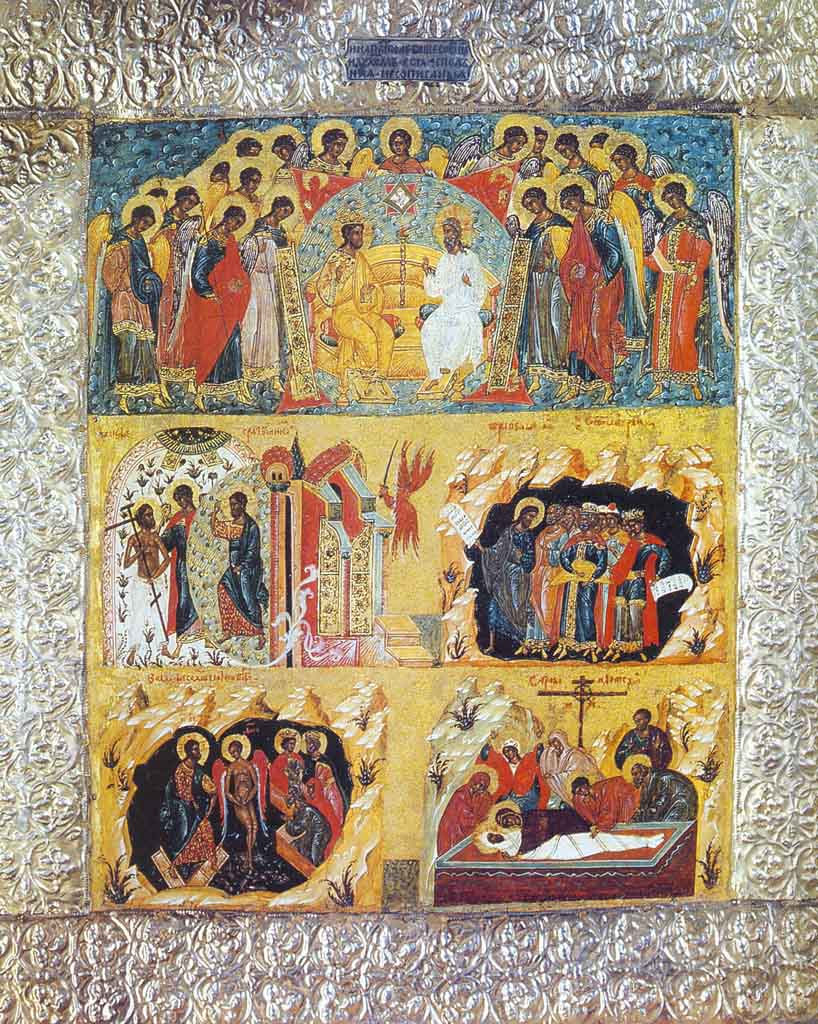
A five-part Russian Orthodox icon depicting the Easter story. Eastern Orthodox Christians use a different computation for the date of Easter from the Western churches.

The precise date of Easter has at times been a matter of contention. By the later 2nd century, it was widely accepted that the celebration of the holiday was a practice of the disciples and an undisputed tradition. The Quartodeciman controversy, the first of several Easter controversies, arose concerning the date on which the holiday should be celebrated.

The term "Quartodeciman" refers to the practice of ending the Lenten fast on Nisan 14 of the Hebrew calendar, "the LORD's passover". According to the church historian Eusebius, the Quartodeciman Polycarp (bishop of Smyrna, by tradition a disciple of John the Apostle) debated the question with Anicetus (bishop of Rome). The Roman province of Asia was Quartodeciman, while the Roman and Alexandrian churches continued the fast until the Sunday following (the Sunday of Unleavened Bread), wishing to associate Easter with Sunday. Neither Polycarp nor Anicetus persuaded the other, but they did not consider the matter schismatic either, parting in peace and leaving the question unsettled.

Controversy arose when Victor, bishop of Rome a generation after Anicetus, attempted to excommunicate Polycrates of Ephesus and all other bishops of Asia for their Quartodecimanism. According to Eusebius, a number of synods were convened to deal with the controversy, which he regarded as all ruling in support of Easter on Sunday. Polycrates (c. 190), however, wrote to Victor defending the antiquity of Asian Quartodecimanism. Victor's attempted excommunication was apparently rescinded, and the two sides reconciled upon the intervention of bishop Irenaeus and others, who reminded Victor of the tolerant precedent of Anicetus.

Quartodecimanism seems to have lingered into the 4th century, when Socrates of Constantinople recorded that some Quartodecimans were deprived of their churches by John Chrysostom and that some were harassed by Nestorius.

It is not known how long the Nisan 14 practice continued. But both those who followed the Nisan 14 custom, and those who set Easter to the following Sunday, had in common the custom of consulting their Jewish neighbors to learn when the month of Nisan would fall, and setting their festival accordingly. By the later 3rd century, however, some Christians began to express dissatisfaction with the custom of relying on the Jewish community to determine the date of Easter. The chief complaint was that the Jewish communities sometimes erred in setting Passover to fall before the Northern Hemisphere spring equinox. The Sardica paschal table confirms these complaints, for it indicates that the Jews of some eastern Mediterranean city (possibly Antioch) fixed Nisan 14 on dates well before the spring equinox on multiple occasions.

Because of this dissatisfaction with reliance on the Jewish calendar, some Christians began to experiment with independent computations. (Note: Eusebius reports that Dionysius, Bishop of Alexandria, proposed an 8-year Easter cycle, and quotes a letter from Anatolius, Bishop of Laodicea, that refers to a 19-year cycle. An 8-year cycle has been found inscribed on a statue unearthed in Rome in the 17th century, and since dated to the 3rd century.) Others, however, believed that the customary practice of consulting Jews should continue, even if the Jewish computations were in error.

=== First Council of Nicaea (325 AD) ===
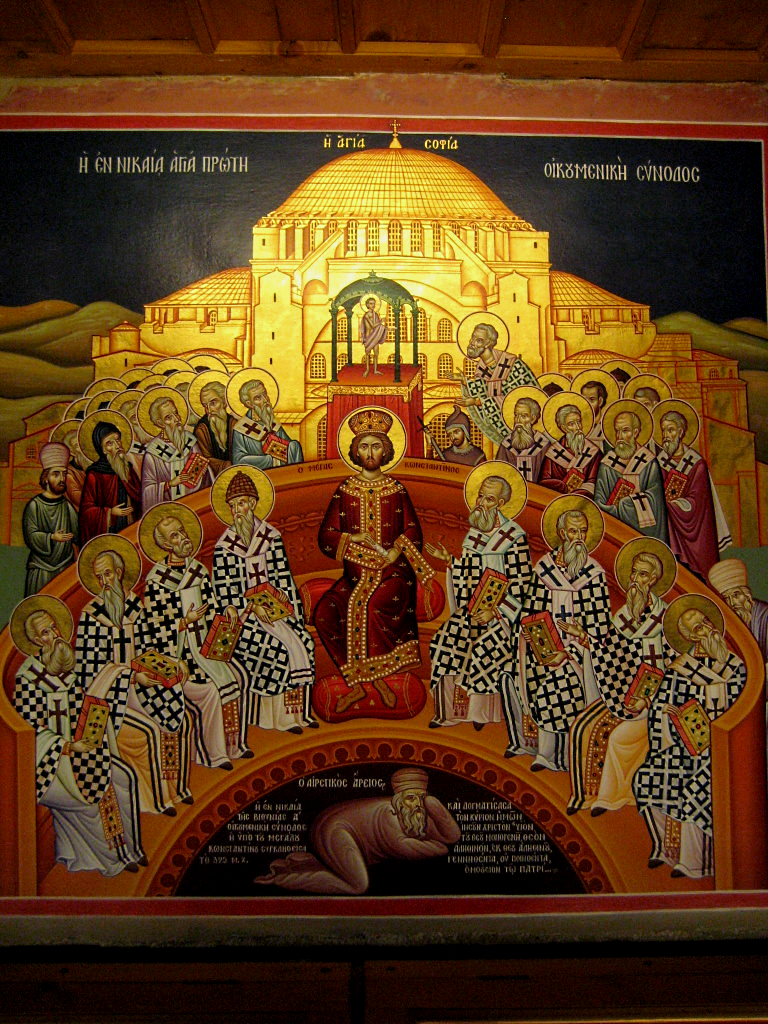
The First Council of Nicaea, with Arius depicted as defeated by the council, lying under the feet of Emperor Constantine

The settlement of the controversy about the Paschal season caused by the Quartodeciman practice of Asian churches is listed in our principal source for the works of the Council of Nicaea, Socrates Scholasticus's Ecclesiastical History, as one of the two reasons for which emperor Constantine convened the Council in 325. The Canons of the Council preserved by Dionysius Exiguus and his successors do not include any relevant provision, but letters of individuals present at the Council mention a decision prohibiting Quartodecimanism and requiring that all Christians adopt a common method to independently determine Paschal observance following the churches of Rome and Alexandria, the latter "since there was among the Egyptians an ancient science for the computation." Already in the end of the 4th century and, later on, Dionysius Exiguus and others following him maintained that the bishops assembled at Nicaea had promulgated the celebration of Easter on the first Sunday after the first full moon on or after the vernal equinox and that they had adopted the use of the 19-year lunar cycle, better known as Metonic cycle, to determine the date; subsequent scholarship has refuted this tradition, but, with regards to the rule of the equinox, evidence that the church of Alexandria had implemented it before 325 suggests that the Council of Nicaea implicitly endorsed it.

Canons and sermons condemning the custom of computing Easter's date based on the Jewish calendar indicate that this custom (called "protopaschite" by historians) did not die out at once, but persisted for a time after the Council of Nicaea. In any case, in the years following the council, the computational system that was worked out by the church of Alexandria came to be normative. The Alexandrian system, however, was not immediately adopted throughout Christian Europe. Following Augustalis' treatise De ratione Paschae (On the Measurement of Easter), Rome retired the earlier 8-year cycle in favor of Augustalis' 84-year lunisolar calendar cycle, which it used until 457. It then switched to Victorius of Aquitaine's adaptation of the Alexandrian system.

Because this Victorian cycle differed from the unmodified Alexandrian cycle in the dates of some of the Paschal full moons, and because it tried to respect the Roman custom of fixing Easter to the Sunday in the week of the 16th to the 22nd of the lunar month (rather than the 15th to the 21st as at Alexandria), by providing alternative "Latin" and "Greek" dates in some years, occasional differences in the date of Easter as fixed by Alexandrian rules continued. The Alexandrian rules were adopted in the West following the tables of Dionysius Exiguus in 525.

Early Christians in Britain and Ireland also used an 84-year cycle. From the 5th century onward this cycle set its equinox to 25 March and fixed Easter to the Sunday falling in the 14th to the 20th of the lunar month inclusive. This 84-year cycle was replaced by the Alexandrian method in the course of the 7th and 8th centuries. Churches in western continental Europe used a late Roman method until the late 8th century during the reign of Charlemagne, when they finally adopted the Alexandrian method. Since 1582, when the Roman Catholic Church adopted the Gregorian calendar while most of Europe used the Julian calendar, the date on which Easter is celebrated has again differed.

=== Computations ===
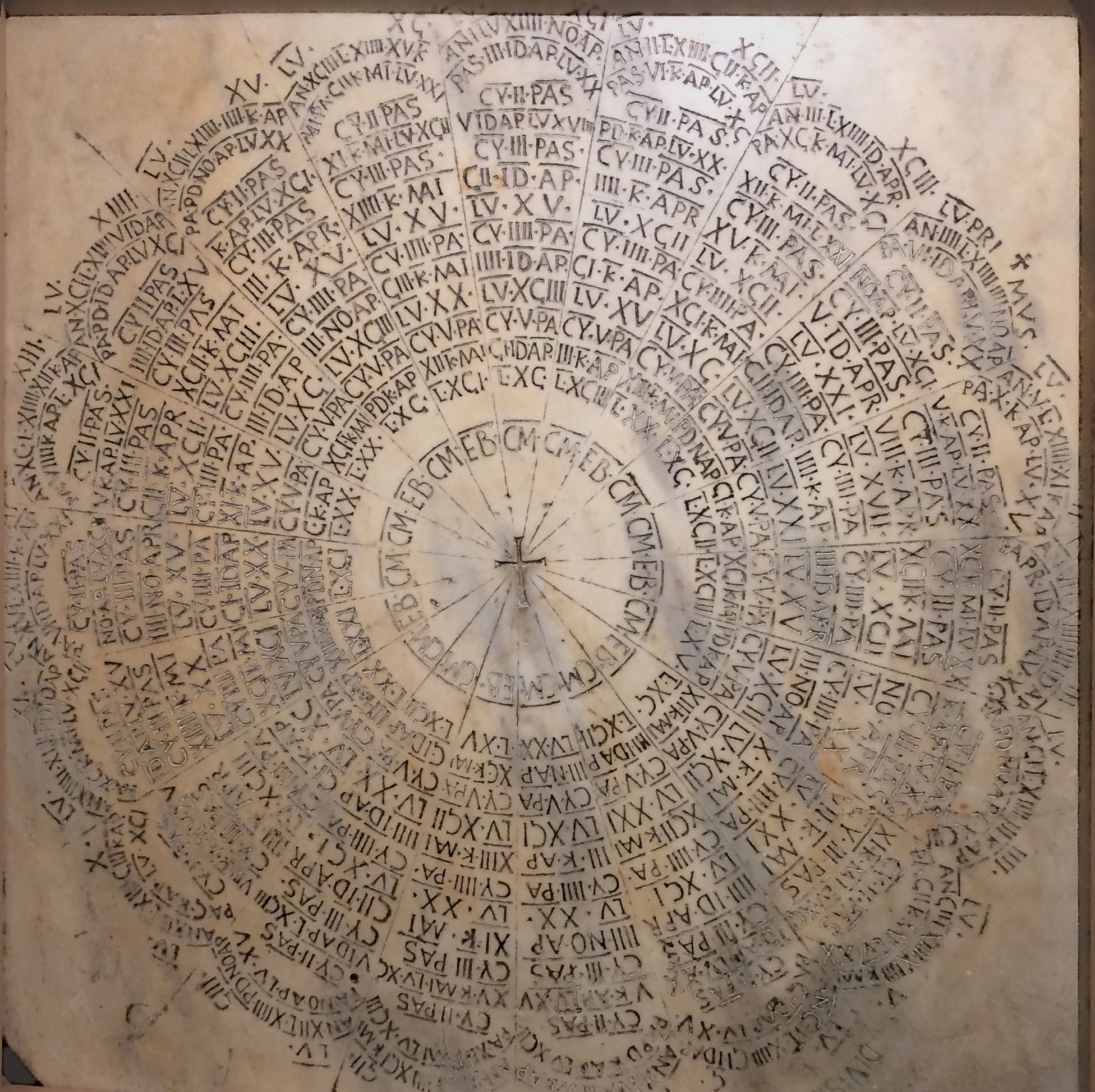
A calendar of the dates of Easter, for the 95 years 532–626, marble, in the Museum of Ravenna Cathedral, Italy. Five 19-year cycles are represented as concentric circles. Dates are given using the system of the Roman calendar, as well as the day of the lunar month.

In 725, Bede succinctly wrote: "The Sunday following the full Moon which falls on or after the equinox will give the lawful Easter." However, this does not precisely reflect the ecclesiastical rules. The full moon referred to (called the Paschal full moon) is not an astronomical full moon, but the 14th day of a lunar month. Another difference is that the astronomical equinox is a natural astronomical phenomenon, which can fall on 19, 20, or 21 March, while the ecclesiastical date is fixed by convention on 21 March.

In addition, the lunar tables of the Julian calendar are currently five days behind those of the Gregorian calendar. Therefore, the Julian computation of the Paschal full moon is a full five days later than the astronomical full moon. The result of this combination of solar and lunar discrepancies is divergence in the date of Easter in most years (see table).

Easter is determined on the basis of lunisolar cycles. The lunar year consists of 30-day and 29-day lunar months, generally alternating, with an embolismic month added periodically to bring the lunar cycle into line with the solar cycle. In each solar year (1 January to 31 December inclusive), the lunar month beginning with an ecclesiastical new moon falling in the 29-day period from 8 March to 5 April inclusive is designated as the paschal lunar month for that year.

Easter is the third Sunday in the paschal lunar month, or, in other words, the Sunday after the paschal lunar month's 14th day. The 14th of the paschal lunar month is designated by convention as the Paschal full moon, although the 14th of the lunar month may differ from the date of the astronomical full moon by up to two days. Since the ecclesiastical new moon falls on a date from 8 March to 5 April inclusive, the paschal full moon (the 14th of that lunar month) must fall on a date from 22 March to 18 April inclusive.

The Gregorian calculation of Easter was based on a method devised by the Calabrian doctor Aloysius Lilius (or Lilio) for adjusting the epacts of the Moon, and has been adopted by almost all Western Christians and by Western countries which celebrate national holidays at Easter. For the British Empire and colonies, a determination of the date of Easter Sunday using Golden Numbers and Sunday letters was defined by the Calendar (New Style) Act 1750 with its Annexe. This was designed to match exactly the Gregorian calculation.

=== Western–Eastern divergence ===
In Western Christianity, using the Gregorian calendar, Easter always falls on a Sunday between 22 March and 25 April, within about seven days after the astronomical full moon. The preceding Friday, Good Friday, and following Monday, Easter Monday, are legal holidays in many countries with predominantly Christian traditions.

Eastern Orthodox Christians use the same rule but base their 21 March according to the Julian calendar. Because of the thirteen-day difference between the calendars from 1900 through 2099, 21 March Julian corresponds to 3 April in the Gregorian calendar (during the 20th and 21st centuries). Consequently, the date of Orthodox Easter varies between 4 April and 8 May in the Gregorian calendar.

Furthermore, because the lunar tables of the Julian calendar are five days behind astronomical reality, the full moon, as defined by the Eastern Orthodox Church, is five days later, on a day which actually is a waning gibbous moon. Therefore, if a Sunday falls on any of the four days after the astronomical full moon, this is regarded as occurring before the ecclesiastical full moon and Easter Sunday will be a week later.

As a result, Orthodox Easter may fall on the same day as Catholic Easter, a week later, four weeks later, or five weeks later (but at no other time intervals, at least until the 25th century). Easter is celebrated on the same day in years in which the vernal full moon occurs late enough to be after the defined equinoxes of both churches and on a Sunday, Monday, or Tuesday. This is the case for 31 years of the 21st century, but the frequency is decreasing. (It occurred in 47 years in the 17th century, but will happen for the last time in 2698, after which the Easters will be permanently on different dates). It falls one week after Catholic Easter when vernal full moon occurs Wednesday through Saturday, or four or five weeks after Catholic Easter when the Catholic vernal full moon falls before or around 29 March, depending on the day of the week.

Among the Oriental Orthodox, some churches have changed from the Julian to the Gregorian calendar and the date for Easter, as for other fixed and moveable feasts, is the same as in the Western church.

The Greek island of Syros, whose population is divided almost equally between Catholics and Orthodox, is one of the few places where the two Churches share a common date for Easter, with the Catholics accepting the Orthodox date—a practice helping considerably in maintaining good relations between the two communities. Conversely, Orthodox Christians in Finland celebrate Easter according to the Western Christian date.

=== Proposed reforms of the date ===
Century year	Remain- der on divide by 900	Is a Revised Julian leap year	Is a Grego- rian leap year	Revised Julian is same as Grego- rian
1000	100	✗	✗	✓
1100	200	✓	✗	✗
1200	300	✗	✓	✗
1300	400	✗	✗	✓
1400	500	✗	✗	✓
1500	600	✓	✗	✗
1600	700	✗	✓	✗
1700	800	✗	✗	✓
1800	0	✗	✗	✓
1900	100	✗	✗	✓
2000	200	✓	✓	✓
2100	300	✗	✗	✓
2200	400	✗	✗	✓
2300	500	✗	✗	✓
2400	600	✓	✓	✓
2500	700	✗	✗	✓
2600	800	✗	✗	✓
2700	0	✗	✗	✓
2800	100	✗	✓	✗
2900	200	✓	✗	✗
3000	300	✗	✗	✓
3100	400	✗	✗	✓
3200	500	✗	✓	✗
3300	600	✓	✗	✗
3400	700	✗	✗	✓
3500	800	✗	✗	✓
3600	0	✗	✓	✗
3700	100	✗	✗	✓
3800	200	✓	✗	✗
3900	300	✗	✗	✓
4000	400	✗	✓	✗

In the 20th and 21st centuries, some individuals and institutions have propounded changing the method of calculating the date for Easter, the most prominent proposal being the Sunday after the second Saturday in April. Despite having some support, proposals to reform the date have not been implemented. An Orthodox congress of Eastern Orthodox bishops, which included representatives mostly from the Patriarch of Constantinople and the Serbian Patriarch, met in Constantinople in 1923, where the bishops agreed to the Revised Julian calendar.

The original form of this calendar would have determined Easter using precise astronomical calculations based on the meridian of Jerusalem. However, all the Eastern Orthodox countries that subsequently adopted the Revised Julian calendar adopted only that part of the revised calendar that applied to festivals falling on fixed dates in the Julian calendar. The revised Easter computation that had been part of the original 1923 agreement was never permanently implemented in any Orthodox diocese.

In the United Kingdom, Parliament passed the Easter Act 1928 to change the date of Easter to be the first Sunday after the second Saturday in April (or, in other words, the Sunday in the period from 9 to 15 April). However, the legislation has not been implemented, although it remains on the Statute book and could be implemented, subject to approval by the various Christian churches.

At a summit in Aleppo, Syria, in 1997, the World Council of Churches (WCC) proposed a reform in the calculation of Easter which would have replaced the present divergent practices of calculating Easter with modern scientific knowledge taking into account actual astronomical instances of the spring equinox and full moon based on the meridian of Jerusalem, while also following the tradition of Easter being on the Sunday following the full moon. The recommended World Council of Churches changes would have sidestepped the calendar issues and eliminated the difference in date between the Eastern and Western churches. The reform was proposed for implementation starting in 2001, and despite repeated calls for reform, it was not ultimately adopted by any member body.

In January 2016, the Anglican Communion, Coptic Orthodox Church, Greek Orthodox Church, and Roman Catholic Church again considered agreeing on a common, universal date for Easter, while also simplifying the calculation of that date, with either the second or third Sunday in April being popular choices.

In November 2022, the Patriarch of Constantinople said that conversations between the Roman Catholic Church and the Orthodox Churches had begun to determine a common date for the celebration of Easter. The agreement is expected to be reached for the 1700th anniversary of the Council of Nicaea in 2025.

=== Table of the dates of Easter by Gregorian and Julian calendars ===
The WCC presented comparative data of the relationships:

Table of (Gregorian) dates of Easter 2015–2030
Year	Full Moon	Jewish Passover (Note: Jewish Passover is on Nisan 15 of its calendar. It commences at sunset preceding the date indicated (as does Easter by some traditions).)	Astronomical Easter (Note: Astronomical Easter is the first Sunday after the astronomical full moon after the astronomical March equinox as measured at the meridian of Jerusalem according to the WCC proposal.)	Gregorian Easter	Julian Easter
2015	4 April		5 April		12 April
2016	23 March	23 April	27 March		1 May
2017	11 April		16 April		
2018	31 March		1 April		8 April
2019	20 March	20 April	24 March	21 April	28 April
2020	8 April	9 April	12 April		19 April
2021	28 March		4 April		2 May
2022	16 April		17 April		24 April
2023	6 April		9 April		16 April
2024	25 March	23 April	31 March		5 May
2025	13 April		20 April		
2026	3 April	2 April	5 April		12 April
2027	22 March	22 April	28 March		2 May
2028	9 April	11 April	16 April		
2029	29 March	31 March	1 April		8 April
2030	17 April	18 April	21 April		28 April

== Position in the church year ==
=== Western Christianity ===
Easter and other named days and day ranges around Lent and Easter in Western Christianity, with the fasting days of Lent numbered

In most branches of Western Christianity, Easter is preceded by Lent, a period of penitence that begins on Ash Wednesday, lasts 40 days (not counting Sundays), and is often marked with fasting. The week before Easter, known as Holy Week, is an important time for observers to commemorate the final week of Jesus' life on earth. The Sunday before Easter is Palm Sunday, with the Wednesday before Easter being known as Spy Wednesday (or Holy Wednesday). The last three days before Easter are Maundy Thursday, Good Friday and Holy Saturday (sometimes referred to as Silent Saturday).

Palm Sunday, Maundy Thursday and Good Friday respectively commemorate Jesus' triumphal entry into Jerusalem, the Last Supper and the crucifixion. Maundy Thursday, Good Friday, and Holy Saturday are sometimes referred to as the Easter Triduum (Latin for "Three Days"). Many churches begin celebrating Easter late in the evening of Holy Saturday at a service called the Easter Vigil.

The week beginning with Easter Sunday is called Easter Week or the Octave of Easter, and each day is prefaced with "Easter", e.g. Easter Monday (a public holiday in many countries), Easter Tuesday (a much less widespread public holiday), etc. Easter Saturday is therefore the Saturday after Easter Sunday. The day before Easter is properly called Holy Saturday. Eastertide, or Paschaltide, the season of Easter, begins on Easter Sunday and lasts until the day of Pentecost, seven weeks later.

=== Eastern Christianity ===
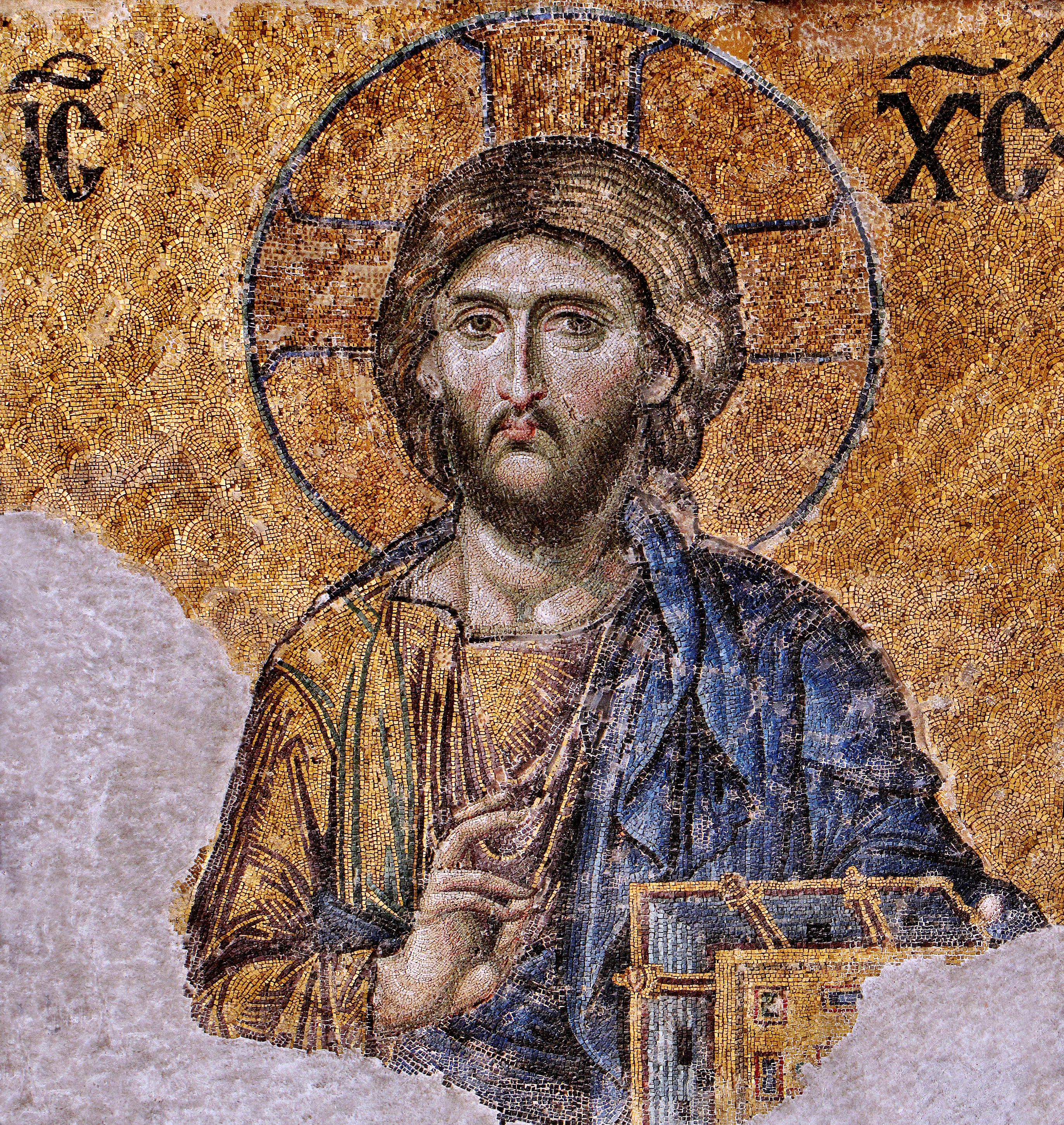
Mosaic of Christ Pantocrator, Hagia Sophia

In Eastern Christianity, the spiritual preparation for Easter/Pascha begins with Great Lent, which starts on Clean Monday and lasts for 40 continuous days (including Sundays). Great Lent ends on a Friday, and the next day is Lazarus Saturday. The Vespers which begins Lazarus Saturday officially brings Great Lent to a close, although the fast continues through the following week.

The Paschal Vigil begins with the Midnight Office, which is the last service of the Lenten Triodion and is timed so that it ends a little before midnight on Holy Saturday night. At the stroke of midnight the Paschal celebration itself begins, consisting of Paschal Matins, Paschal Hours, and Paschal Divine Liturgy.

The liturgical season from Easter to the Sunday of All Saints (the Sunday after Pentecost) is known as the Pentecostarion (the "50 days"). The week which begins on Easter Sunday is called Bright Week, during which there is no fasting, even on Wednesday and Friday. The Afterfeast of Easter lasts 39 days, with its Apodosis (leave-taking) on the day before the Feast of the Ascension. Pentecost Sunday is the 50th day from Easter (counted inclusively). In the Pentecostarion published by Apostoliki Diakonia of the Church of Greece, the Great Feast Pentecost is noted in the synaxarion portion of Matins to be the 8th Sunday of Pascha. However, the Paschal greeting of "Christ is risen!" is no longer exchanged among the faithful after the Apodosis of Pascha.

== Liturgical observance ==
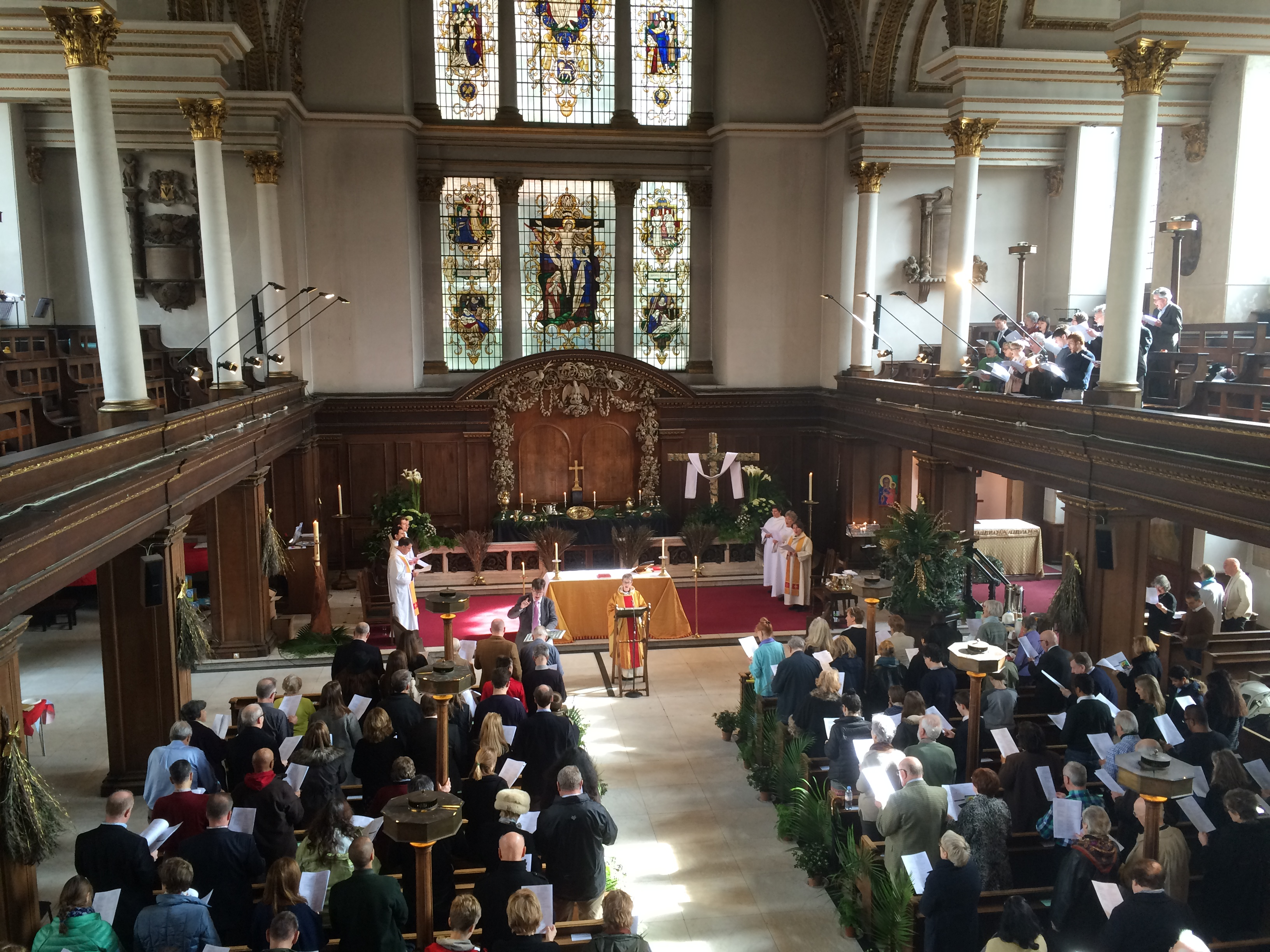
Christian worshippers attend an Easter Sunday church service at St James's Church, Piccadilly, London. The cross in the chancel is draped with a white shroud, symbolizing the resurrection.

=== Western Christianity ===
The Easter festival is kept in many different ways among Western Christians. The traditional, liturgical observation of Easter, as practised among Roman Catholics, Lutherans, and some Anglicans begins on the night of Holy Saturday with the Easter Vigil which follows an ancient liturgy involving symbols of light, candles and water and numerous readings from the Old and New Testament.

Services continue on Easter Sunday and in a number of countries on Easter Monday. In parishes of the Moravian Church, as well as some other denominations such as the Methodist Churches, there is a tradition of Easter sunrise services, often starting in cemeteries in remembrance of the biblical narrative in the Gospels, or other places in the open where the sunrise is visible.

In some traditions, Easter services typically begin with the Paschal greeting: "Christ is risen!" The response is: "He is risen indeed. Alleluia!"

=== Eastern Christianity ===
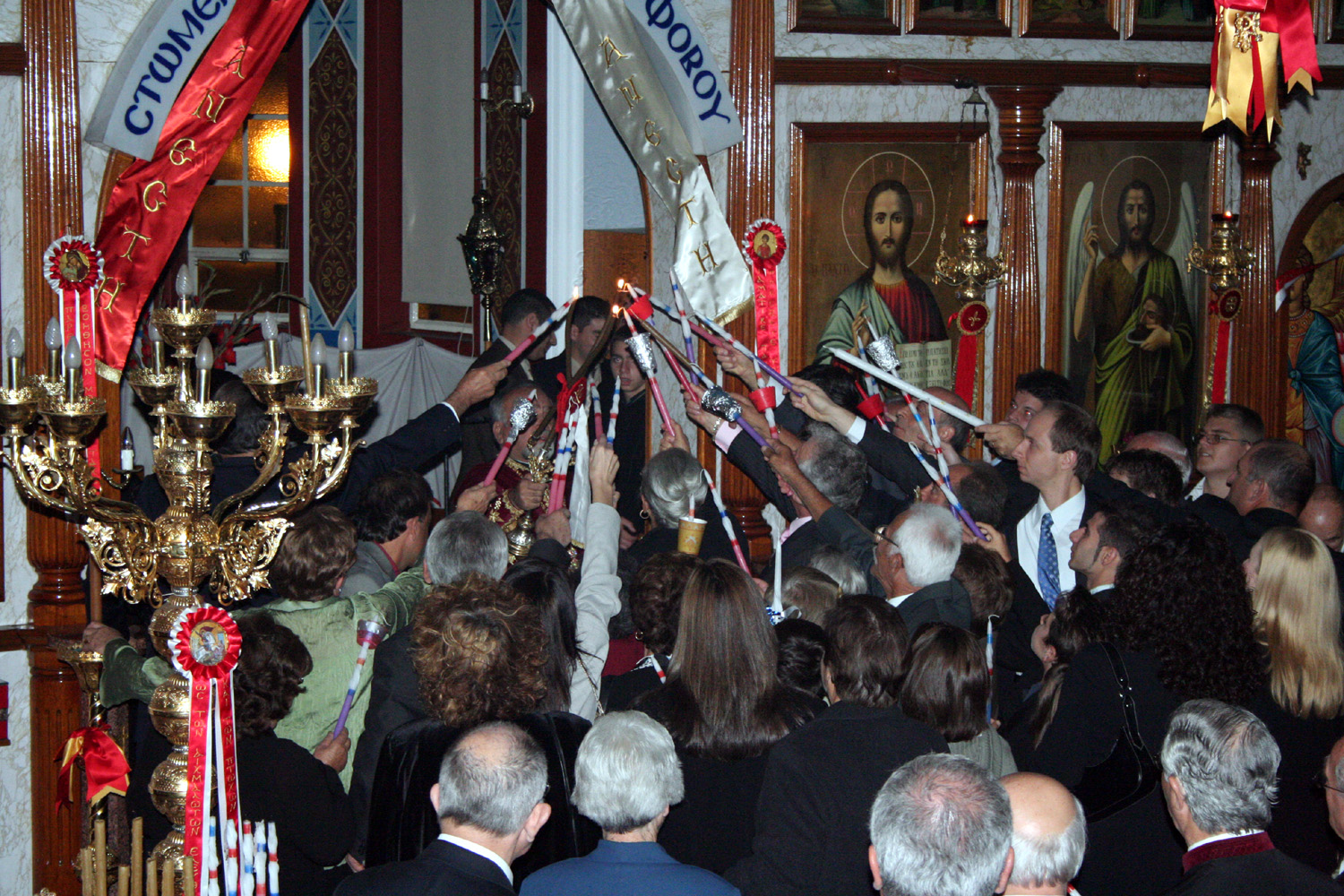
The congregation lighting their candles from the new flame, just as the priest has retrieved it from the altar. The picture is flash-illuminated; all electric lighting is off, and only the oil lamps in front of the Iconostasis remain lit. (St. George Greek Orthodox Church, Adelaide).

Eastern Orthodox, Eastern Catholics and Byzantine Rite Lutherans have a similar emphasis on Easter in their calendars, and many of their liturgical customs are very similar.

Preparation for Easter begins with the season of Great Lent, which begins on Clean Monday. While the end of Lent is Lazarus Saturday, fasting does not end until Easter Sunday. The Orthodox service begins late Saturday evening, observing the Jewish tradition that evening is the start of liturgical holy days.

The church is darkened, then the priest lights a candle at midnight, representing the resurrection of Jesus Christ. Altar servers light additional candles, with a procession which moves three times around the church to represent the three days in the tomb. The service continues early into Sunday morning, with a feast to end the fasting. An additional service is held later that day on Easter Sunday.

=== Non-observing Christian groups ===
Many Puritans saw traditional feasts of the established Anglican Church, such as All Saints' Day and Easter, as abominations because the Bible does not mention them. Conservative Reformed denominations such as the Free Presbyterian Church of Scotland and the Reformed Presbyterian Church of North America likewise reject the celebration of Easter as a violation of the regulative principle of worship, based on what they see as its non-Scriptural origin.

Easter is rejected by groups such as the Restored Church of God, who claim it originated as a pagan spring festival adopted by the Roman Catholic Church.

Jehovah's Witnesses maintain a similar view, observing a yearly commemorative service of the Last Supper and the subsequent execution of Christ on the evening of Nisan 14 (as they calculate the dates derived from the lunar Hebrew calendar). It is commonly referred to by many Witnesses as simply "The Memorial". Jehovah's Witnesses believe that such verses as Luke 22:19–20 and 1 Corinthians 11:26 constitute a commandment to remember the death of Christ, though not the resurrection.

Members of the Religious Society of Friends (Quakers), as part of their historic testimony against times and seasons, do not celebrate or observe Easter or any traditional feast days of the established Church, believing instead that "every day is the Lord's Day", and that elevation of one day above others suggests that it is acceptable to do un-Christian acts on other days. During the 17th and 18th centuries, Quakers were persecuted for this non-observance of Holy Days.

== Easter celebrations around the world ==
Pastel colors are commonly associated with Easter.

Easter is celebrated through various customs and practices across cultures and communities around the world. Eastertide is seen as a time of celebration and feasting, in contrast to the antecedent season of Lent, which is a time of penitence and fasting. Traditions include sunrise services or late-night vigils, exclamations and exchanges of Paschal greetings, flowering the cross, the wearing of Easter bonnets by women, and the custom of clipping the church. The Easter lily, a symbol of the resurrection in Christianity, traditionally decorates the chancel area of churches on this day and for the rest of Eastertide. There are also traditional Easter foods that vary by region and culture. The decoration and communal breaking of Easter eggs is a traditional practice, with the Easter egg symbolising the empty tomb. Related practices include egg rolling, egg tapping, and cascarones or confetti eggs. Egg hunting, originating in the idea of searching for the empty tomb, is an activity that remains popular among children. During the last century and a half, Easter has become increasingly commercialized, seeing wide sales of greeting cards and confectionery such as chocolate Easter eggs.

In countries where Christianity is a state religion, or those with large Christian populations, Easter is often a public holiday. As Easter always falls on a Sunday, many countries in the world also recognize Good Friday and Easter Monday as public holidays. Depending on the country, retail stores, shopping malls and restaurants may be closed on the Friday, Monday or Sunday.

In the Nordic countries, Good Friday, Easter Sunday, and Easter Monday are public holidays, and Good Friday and Easter Monday are bank holidays. In Denmark, Iceland and Norway, Maundy Thursday is also a public holiday; it is a holiday for most workers, except those operating some shopping malls which keep open for a half-day. Many businesses give their employees almost a week off, called Easter break. Schools are closed between Palm Sunday and Easter Monday. According to a 2014 poll, 6 of 10 Norwegians travel during Easter, often to a countryside cottage; 3 of 10 said their typical Easter included skiing.

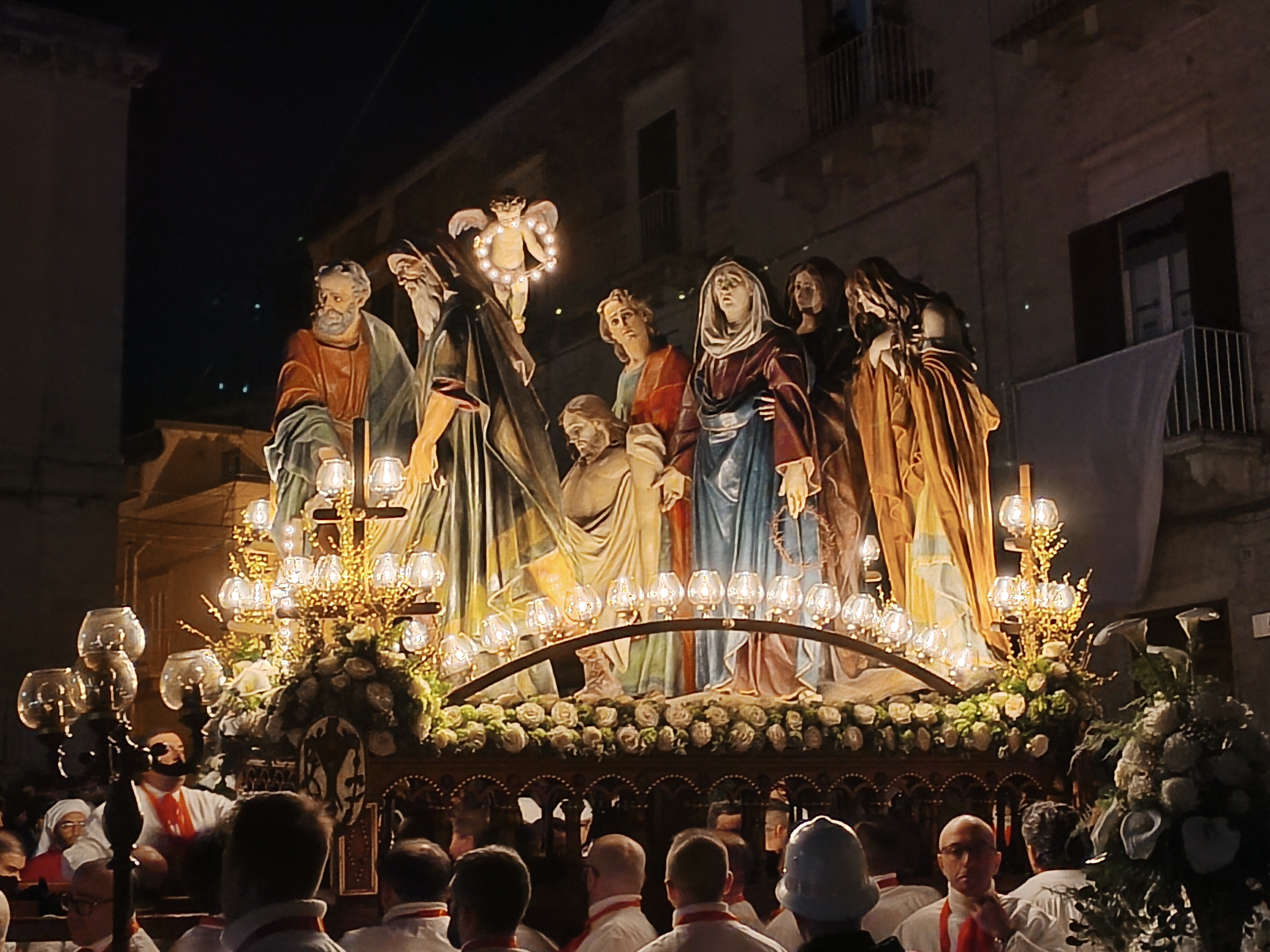
Holy Week in Ruvo di Puglia, Apulia, Italy

Easter in Italy is one of that country's major holidays. Easter in Italy enters Holy Week with Palm Sunday, Maundy Thursday, Good Friday, and Holy Saturday, concluding with Easter Day and Easter Monday. Each day has a special significance. In Italy, both Easter Sunday and Easter Monday are national holidays, which results in a first and a second Easter Sunday, after which the week continues to a Tuesday. Also in the Netherlands, both Easter Sunday and Easter Monday are national holidays, and like first and second Christmas Day, they are both considered Sundays, resulting in a first and a second Easter Sunday, after which the week continues to a Tuesday.

Good Friday and Saturday as well as Easter Sunday and Monday are traditionally observed public holidays in Greece. It is customary for employees of the public sector to receive Easter bonuses as a gift from the state.

In the United Kingdom, Good Friday and Easter Monday are bank holidays, except in Scotland, where only Good Friday is a bank holiday. In Canada, Easter Monday is a statutory holiday for federal employees. In the Canadian province of Quebec, either Good Friday or Easter Monday are statutory holidays (although most companies give both). In Australia, Easter is associated with harvest time; Good Friday and Easter Monday are public holidays across all states and territories. The Saturday before Easter is a public holiday in every Australian state except Tasmania and Western Australia. Easter Sunday itself is a public holiday in every state and territory other than Tasmania; Easter Tuesday is additionally a conditional public holiday in Tasmania, varying upon different industrial awards, and was also a public holiday in Victoria until 1994. In New Zealand, Good Friday and Easter Monday are both state holidays.

In the United States, which is a secular country, Easter is not designated as a federal holiday. Easter parades are held in many American cities, though not sponsored by any government, involving festive strolling processions.

Easter In Nigeria is a major Christian festival in respect of the resurrection of Jesus Christ and it's a widely observed festival across Nigeria.

=== Easter food ===
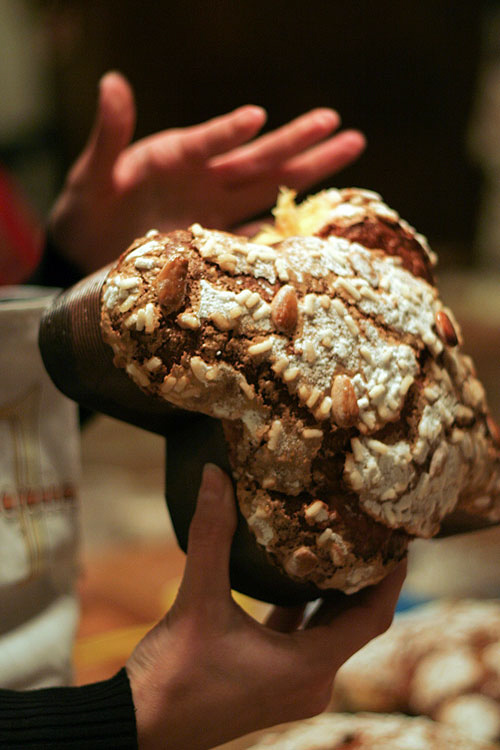
Italian Easter tradition includes Easter bread, the Colomba di Pasqua, the Easter counterpart to traditional Italian Christmas desserts, panettone and pandoro.

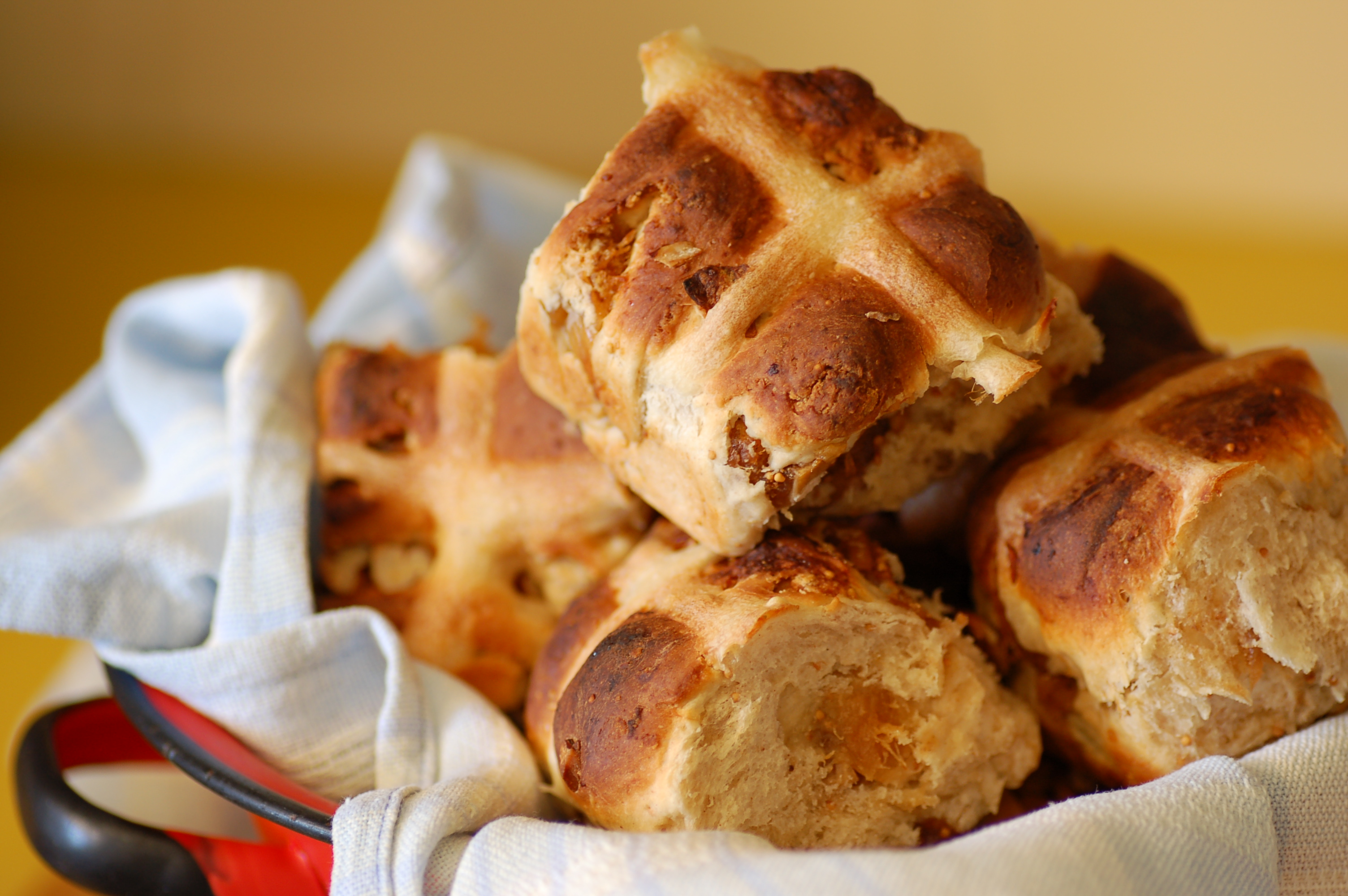
Hot cross bun

Easter is associated with diverse regional food traditions (foodways), including the popular practice of preparing, coloring, and decorating Easter eggs. Lamb is eaten in many countries, mirroring the Jewish Passover meal. Eating lamb at Easter has religious meaning, as the Paschal Lamb of the New Testament represents Jesus Christ and his sacrifice for the sins of humanity. Eating lamb at Easter therefore commemorates the death and resurrection of Jesus.

A hot cross bun is a spiced fruit bun typically marked with a cross on the top, which has been traditionally eaten on Good Friday in the United Kingdom, Australia, New Zealand, South Africa, Canada, India, Pakistan, Malta, United States, and the Commonwealth Caribbean. They are available all year round in some places, including the UK. The bun marks the end of Lent and different parts of the hot cross bun have a certain meaning, including the cross representing the crucifixion of Jesus, the spices inside signifying the spices used to embalm him at his burial and sometimes also orange peel to reflect the bitterness of his time on the cross. The Greeks in the 6th century AD may have marked cakes with a cross. In the Christian tradition, the making of buns with a cross on them and consuming them after breaking the fast on Good Friday, along with "crying about 'Hot cross buns'", is done in order to commemorate the crucifixion of Jesus. It is hypothesised that the contemporary hot cross bun of Christianity originates from St Albans Abbey in St Albans, England, where in 1361, Brother Thomas Rodcliffe, a 14th-century Christian monk, developed a similar recipe called an 'Alban Bun' and distributed the bun to the poor on Good Friday.

For lunch or dinner on Holy Saturday, families in Sweden and Denmark traditionally feast on a smörgåsbord of herring, salmon, potatoes, eggs, and other kinds of food. In Finland, it is common to eat roasted lamb with potatoes and other vegetables. In Finland, the Lutheran majority enjoys mämmi as another traditional Easter treat, while the Orthodox minority's traditions include eating pasha (also spelled paskha) instead. In Greece, the traditional Easter meal is mageiritsa, a hearty stew of chopped lamb liver and wild greens seasoned with egg-and-lemon sauce. Traditionally, Easter eggs, hard-boiled eggs dyed bright red to symbolize the spilt Blood of Christ and the promise of eternal life, are cracked together to celebrate the opening of the Tomb of Christ. Greek foods of the Easter tradition are Flaouna, Lazarakia, Koulourakia, Magiritsa and Tsoureki.

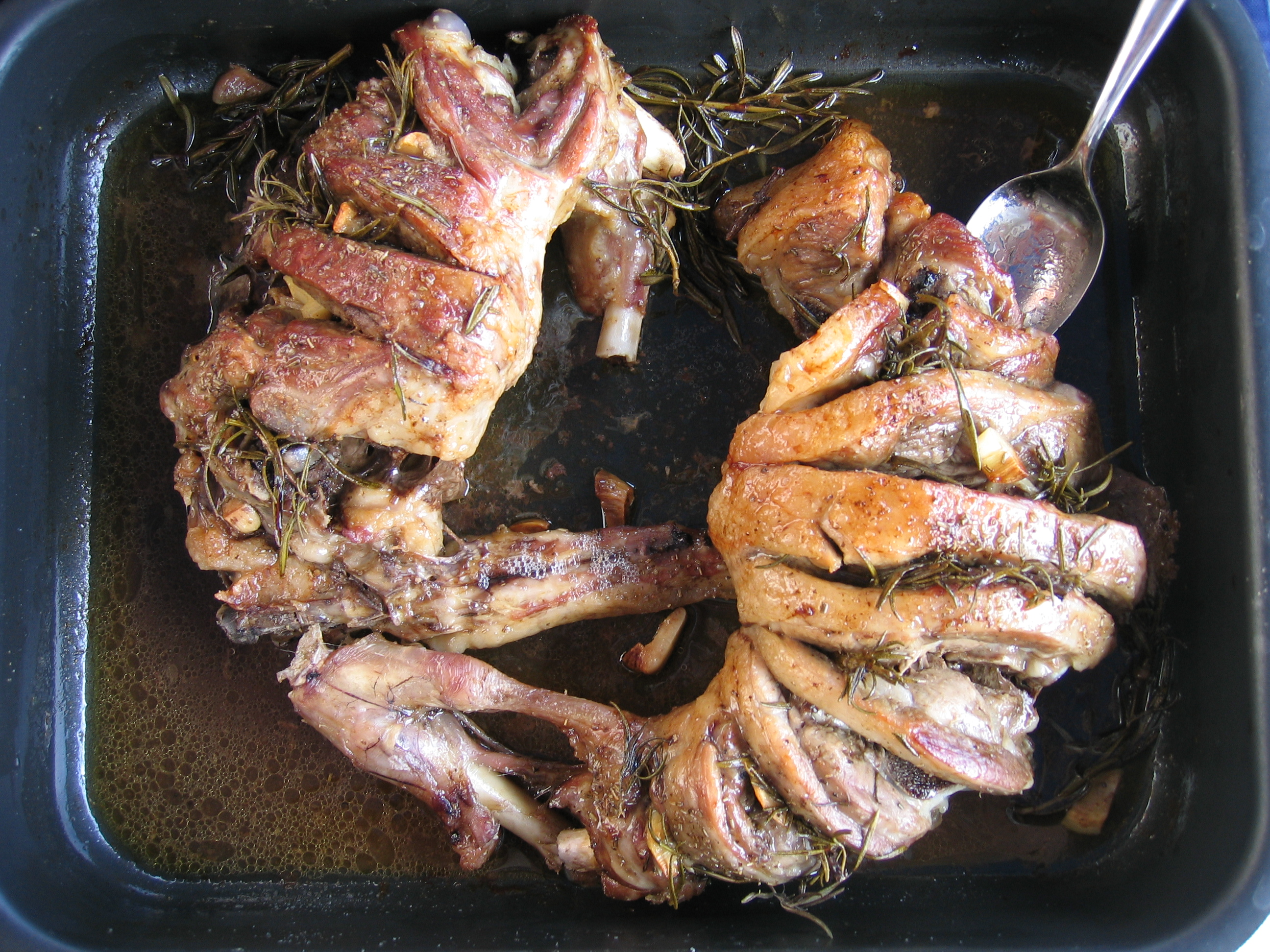
Abbacchio, a lamb preparation from the Italian Easter tradition

Traditional Italian dishes for the Easter period are abbacchio, cappello del prete, casatiello, Colomba di Pasqua, pastiera, penia, pizza di Pasqua and pizzelle. Abbacchio is an Italian preparation of lamb typical of the Roman cuisine. It is a product protected by the European Union with the PGI mark. In Italy at Easter, abbacchio is cooked in different ways, with recipes that vary from region to region. In Rome it is roasted, in Apulia in the oven, in Naples it is cooked with peas and eggs, in Sardinia it is cooked in the oven with potatoes, artichokes and myrtle and in Tuscany it is cooked in cacciatore style. Other local preparations include frying and stewing. Colomba di Pasqua (English: "Easter Dove") is an Italian traditional Easter bread, the Easter counterpart of the two well-known Italian Christmas desserts, panettone and pandoro.

Capirotada or Capilotade, also known as Capirotada de vigilia, is a traditional Mexican food similar to a bread pudding that is usually eaten during the Lenten period. It is one of the dishes served on Good Friday. Despite originally being consumed before Lent, capirotada is now consumed during Lent, especially during Holy Week and on Good Friday. Recently, it has been given a spiritual meaning in relation to the passion of Christ and the Lenten season, thus, for many people, the bread represents the Body of Christ, the syrup is his blood, the cloves are the nails of the cross, and the whole cinnamon sticks are the wood of the cross. The melted cheese stands for the Holy Shroud.

The Easter mona is a Spanish kind of cake that is especially eaten on Easter Sunday or Easter Monday in the Spanish regions of Catalonia, Valencia and Murcia. In other Spanish regions, these Easter cakes are common with variations in the recipe and name. According to the writing of Joan Amades, mentions of the mona date back to the 15th century, though in the Joan Lacavalleria's 1696 dictionary, Gazophylacium Catalano-Latinum, mona still has a purely zoological definition (meaning female monkey). The 1783 edition of the dictionary of the Royal Spanish Academy has the following definition: "Catalonia, Valencia and Murcia. Cake baked with eggs in their shell at Easter, known in other parts of the Iberian Peninsula as Hornazo".

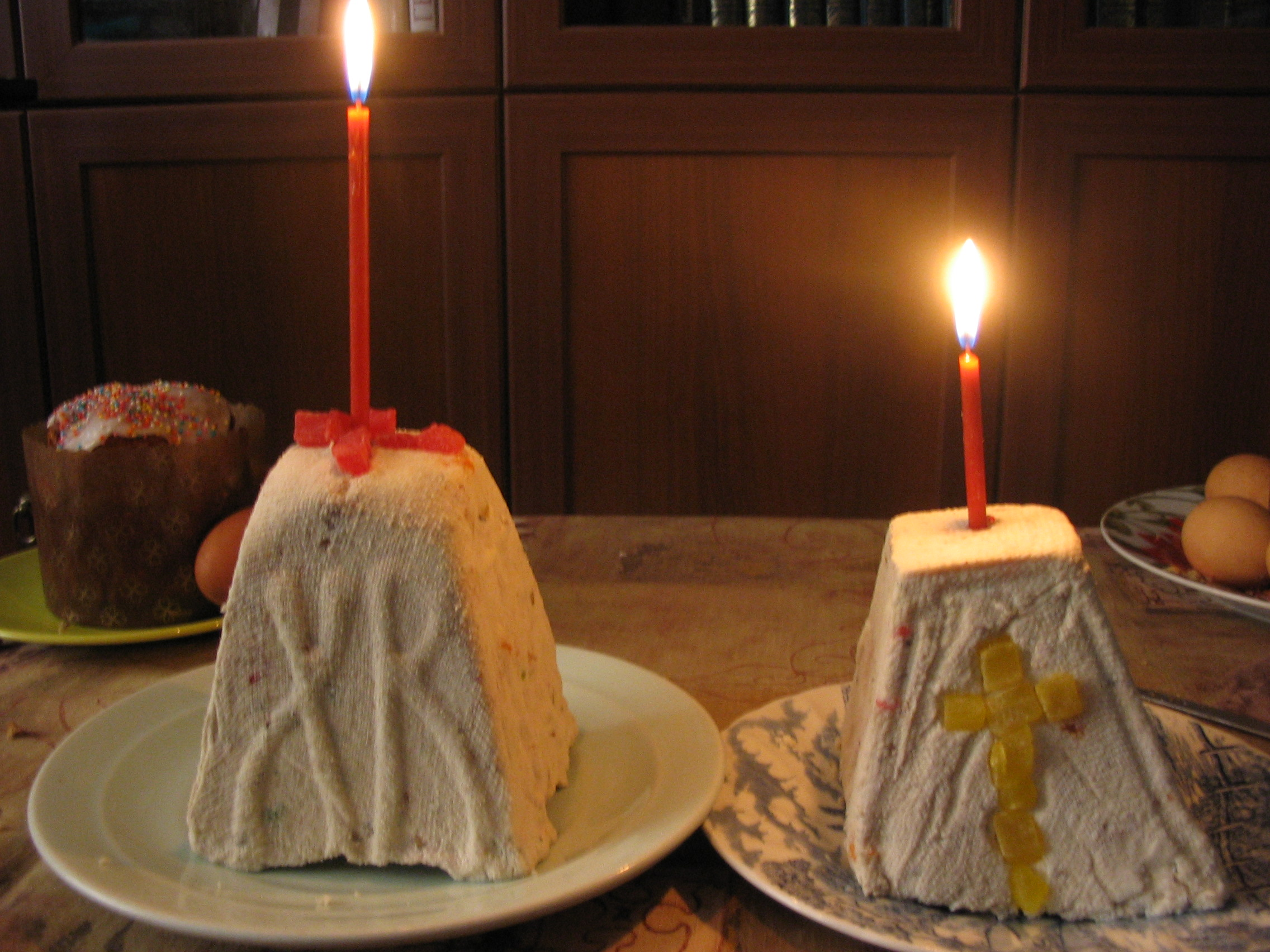
Two paskhas with candles (with a kulich and Easter eggs in the background)

Paskha is a Slavic festive dish made in Eastern Orthodox countries which consists of food that is forbidden during the fast of Great Lent. It is made during Holy Week and then brought to Church on Great Saturday to be blessed after the Paschal Vigil. The name of the dish comes from Pascha, the Eastern Orthodox celebration of Easter. Pasha is also often served in Finland. Cheese paskha is a traditional Easter dish made from tvorog (like cottage cheese), which is white, symbolizing the purity of Christ, the Paschal Lamb, and the joy of the Resurrection. It is formed in a mold, traditionally in the shape of a truncated pyramid which symbolizes the first Passover in Egypt, a nod to Christianity's early Jewish beginnings and a reminder that the Last Supper of Jesus was a Passover Seder. Others believe the pyramid is a symbol of the Trinity, the Church, or the Tomb of Christ. It is usually served as an accompaniment to rich Easter breads called paska in Ukraine and kulich in Russia (where the "paskha" name is also used in the Southern regions). The Easter foods; bread and cheese paska are very rich and made of many dairy items given up during Great Lent. They are brought to church on Easter to be blessed by the priest.

=== Easter eggs ===
==== Traditional customs ====
The egg is an ancient symbol of new life and rebirth. In Christianity it became associated with Jesus's crucifixion and resurrection. The custom of the Easter egg originated in the early Christian community of Mesopotamia, who stained eggs red in memory of the blood of Christ, shed at his crucifixion. As such, for Christians, the Easter egg is a symbol of the empty tomb. The oldest tradition is to use dyed chicken eggs.

In the Eastern Orthodox Church Easter eggs are blessed by a priest both in families' baskets together with other foods forbidden during Great Lent and alone for distribution or in church or elsewhere.

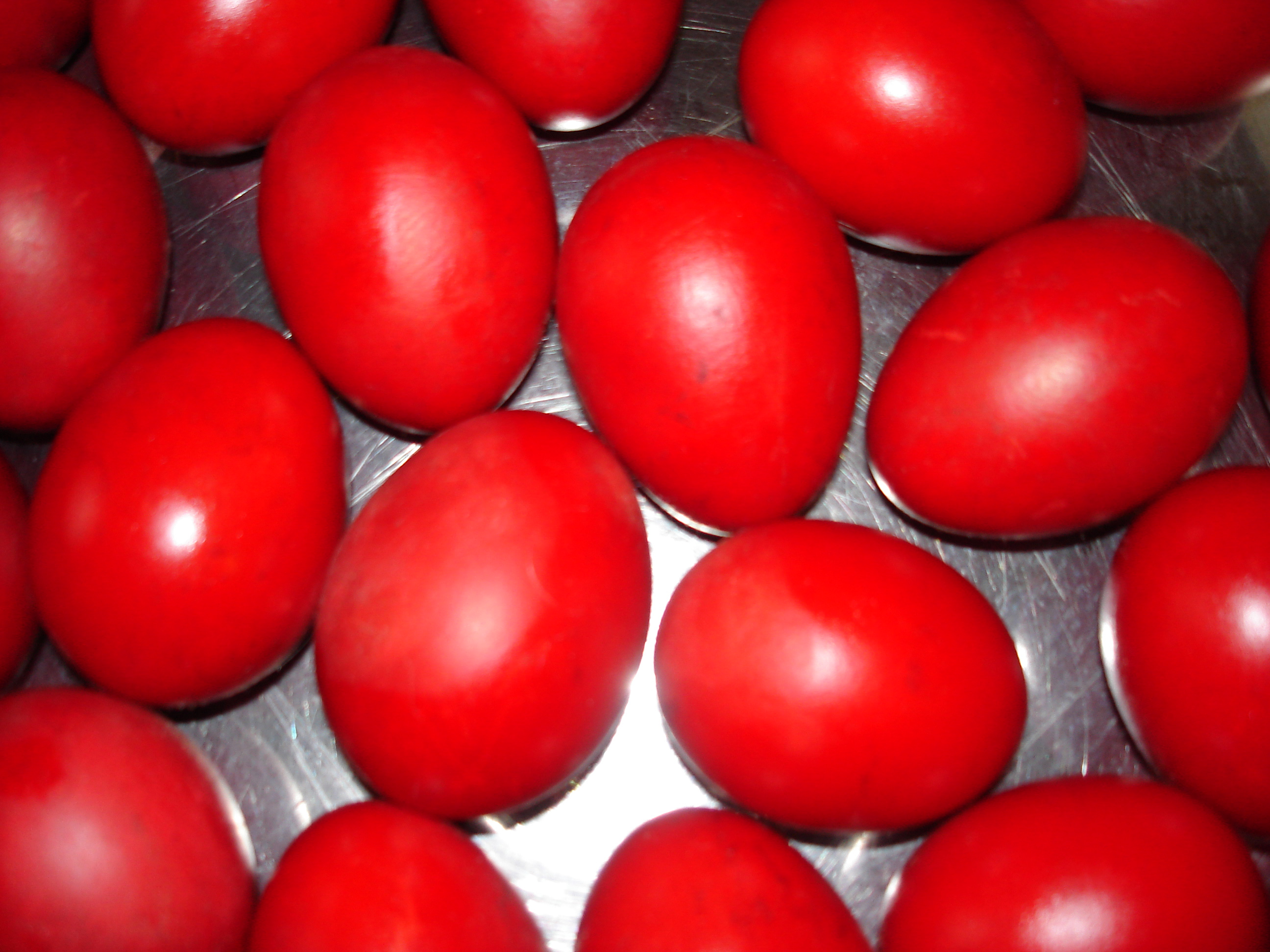
Traditional red Easter eggs for blessing by a priest

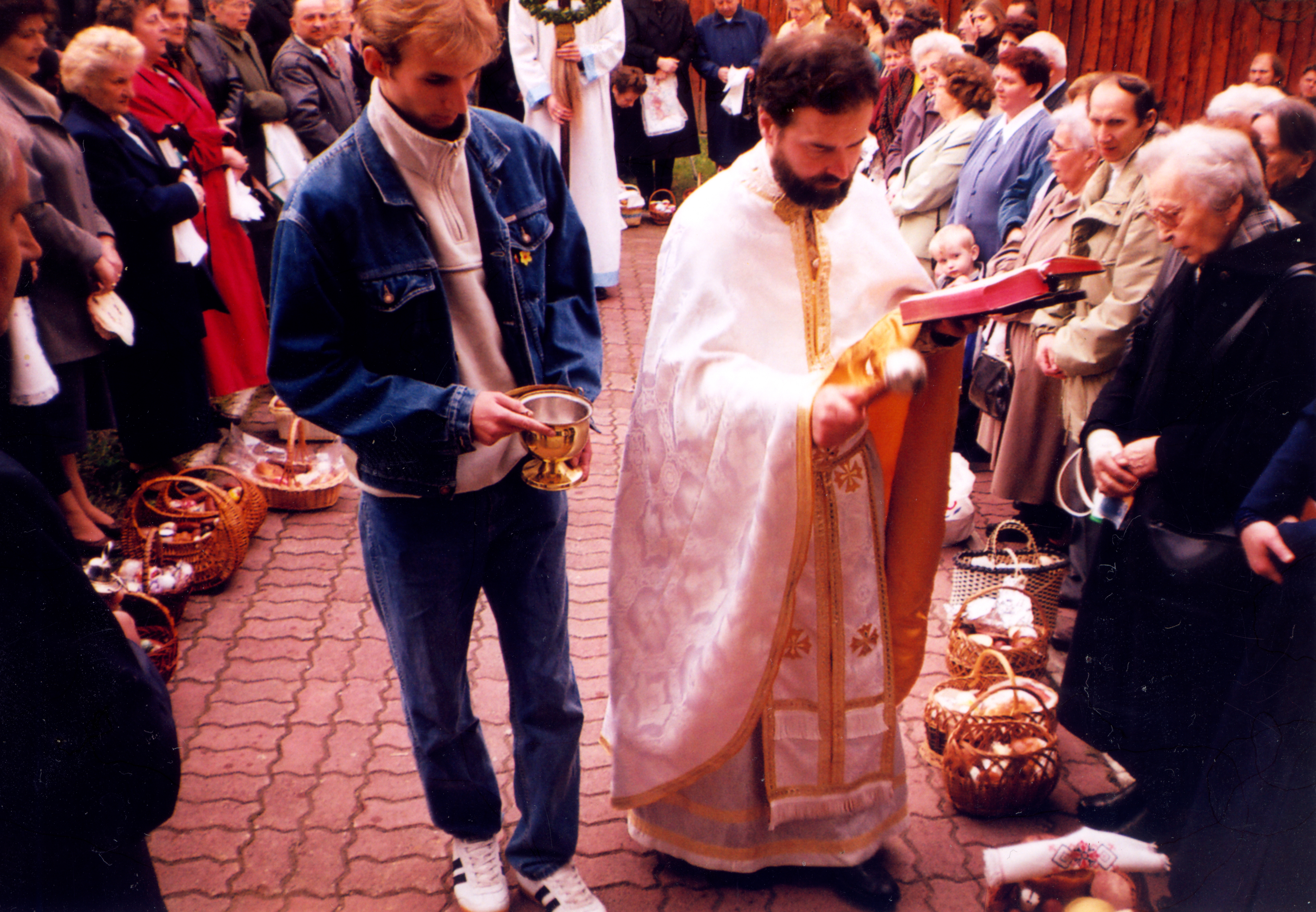
A priest blessing baskets with Easter eggs and other foods forbidden during Great Lent

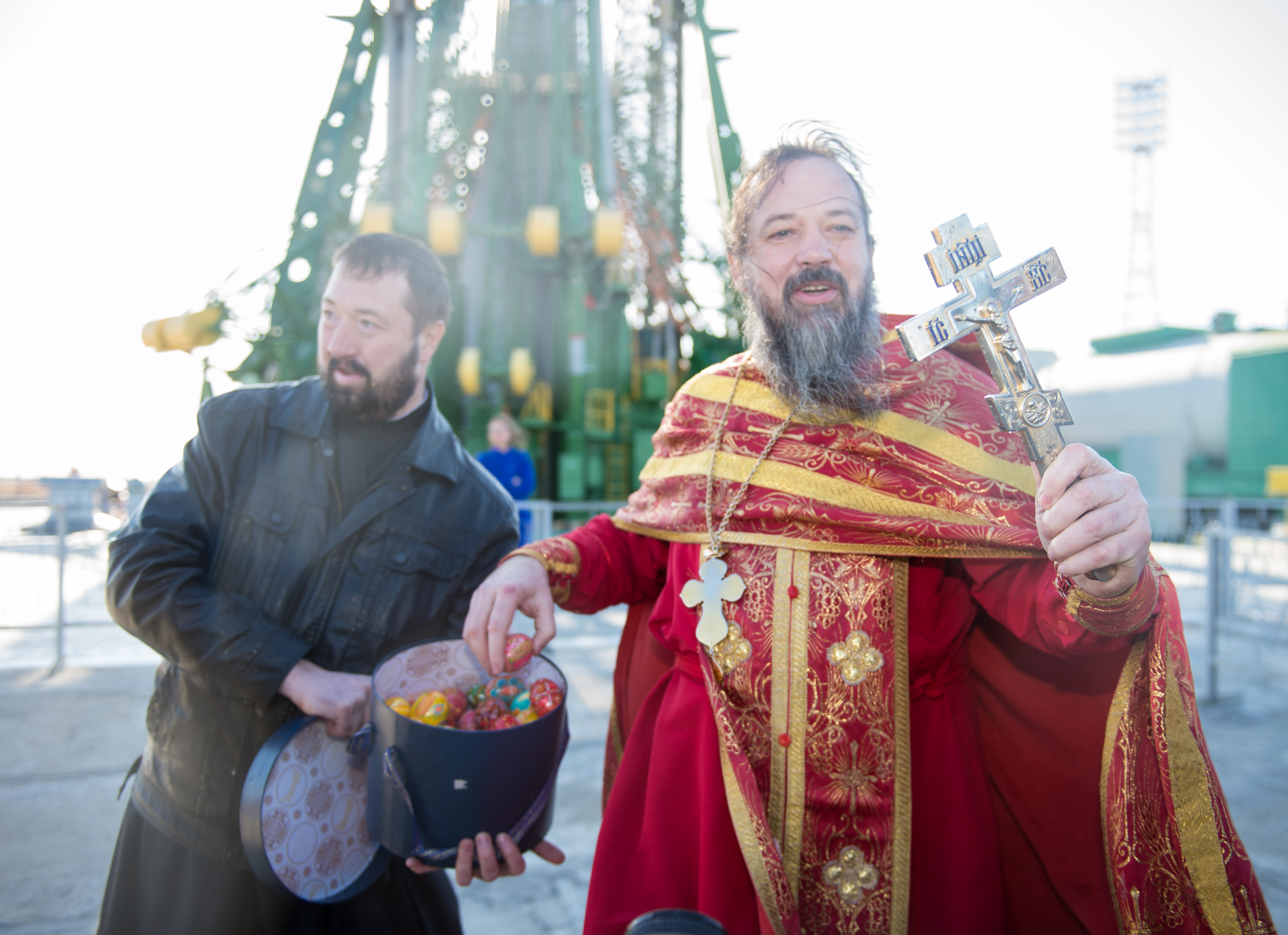
A priest distributing blessed Easter eggs after blessing the Soyuz rocket

Easter eggs are a widely popular symbol of new life among the Eastern Orthodox but also in folk traditions in Slavic countries and elsewhere. A batik-like decorating process known as pisanka produces intricate, brilliantly colored eggs. The celebrated House of Fabergé workshops created exquisite jewelled Easter eggs for the Russian Imperial family from 1885 to 1916.

==== Modern customs ====
A modern custom in the Western world is to substitute decorated chocolate, or plastic eggs filled with candy such as jellybeans; as many people give up candy (sweets) as their Lenten sacrifice, individuals indulge in them at Easter after having abstained during the preceding forty days of Lent.

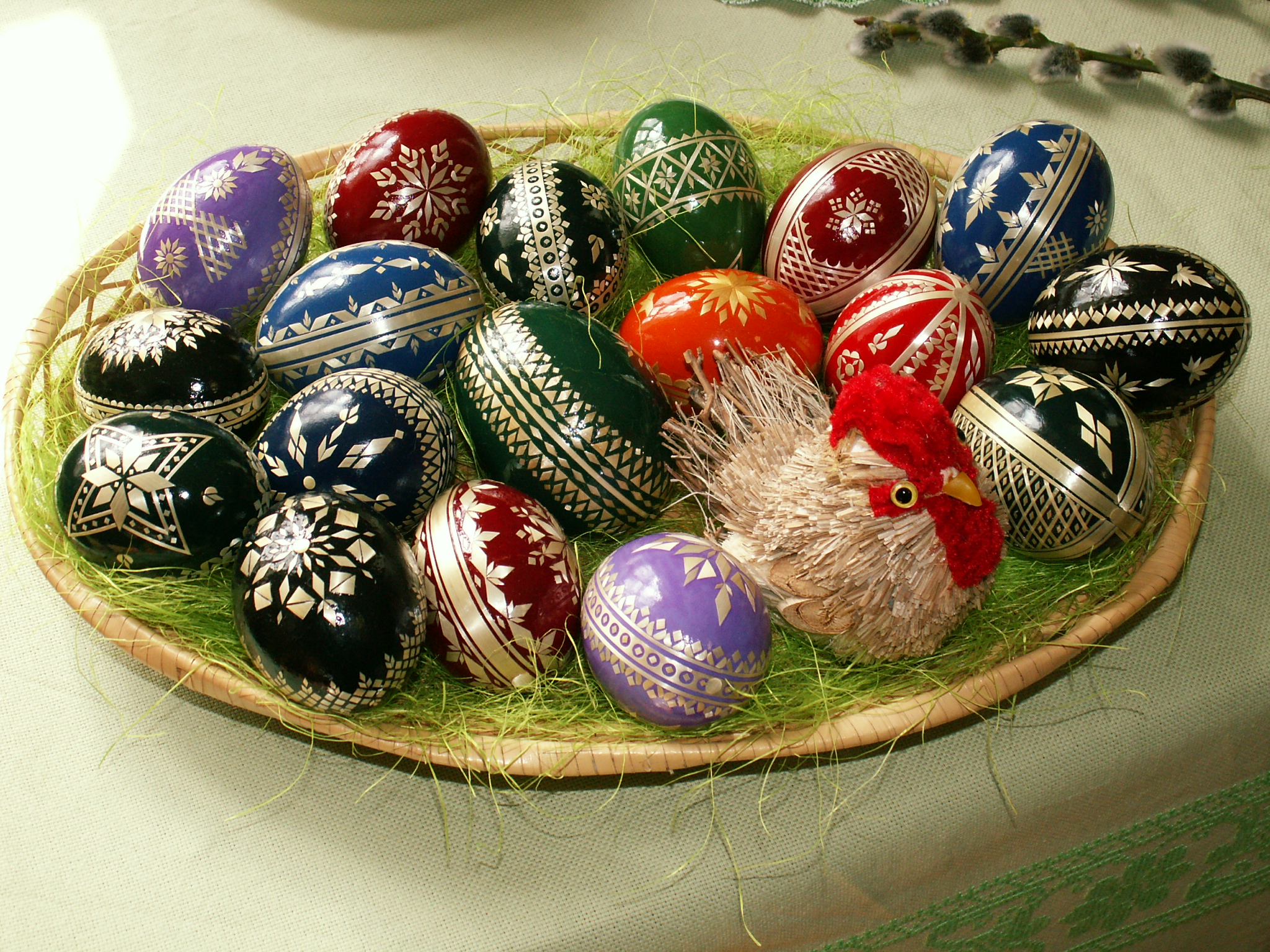
Easter eggs, a symbol of the empty tomb, are a popular cultural symbol of Easter.

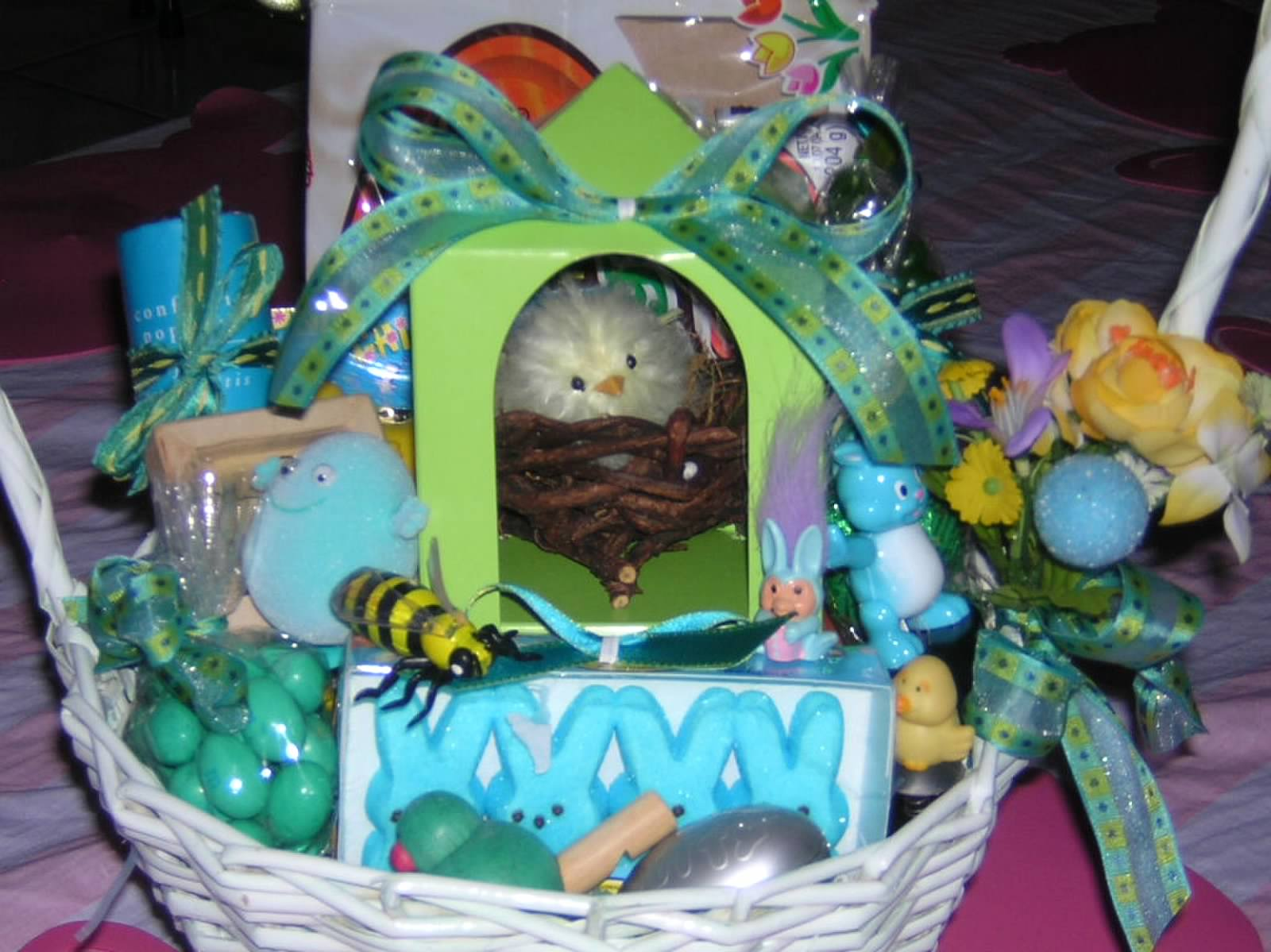
Marshmallow rabbits, candy eggs and other treats in an Easter basket

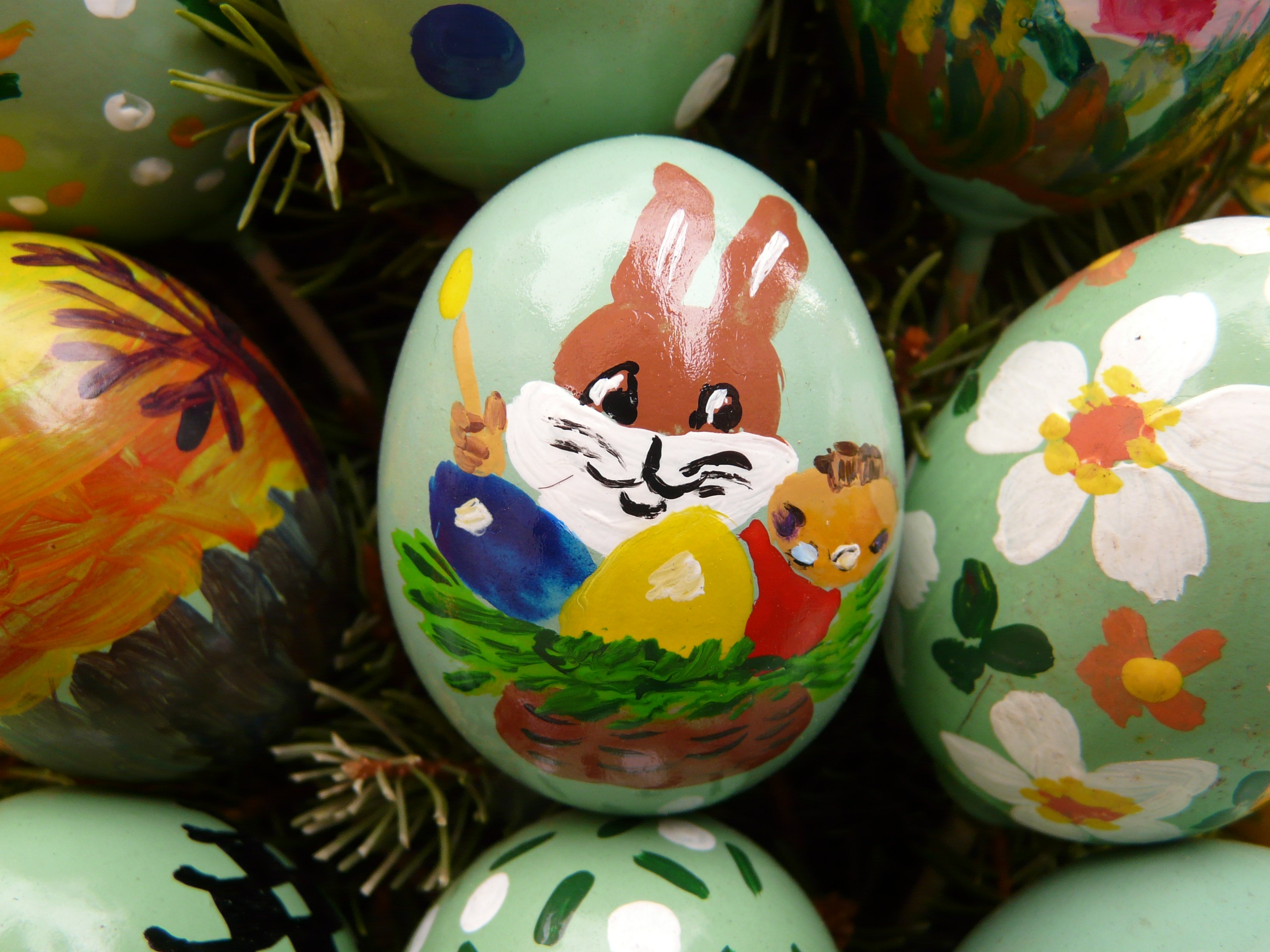
An Easter egg decorated with the Easter Bunny

Manufacturing their first Easter egg in 1875, British chocolate company Cadbury sponsors the annual egg hunt which takes place in over 250 National Trust locations in the United Kingdom. On Easter Monday, the President of the United States holds an annual Easter egg roll on the White House lawn for young children.

===== Easter Bunny =====
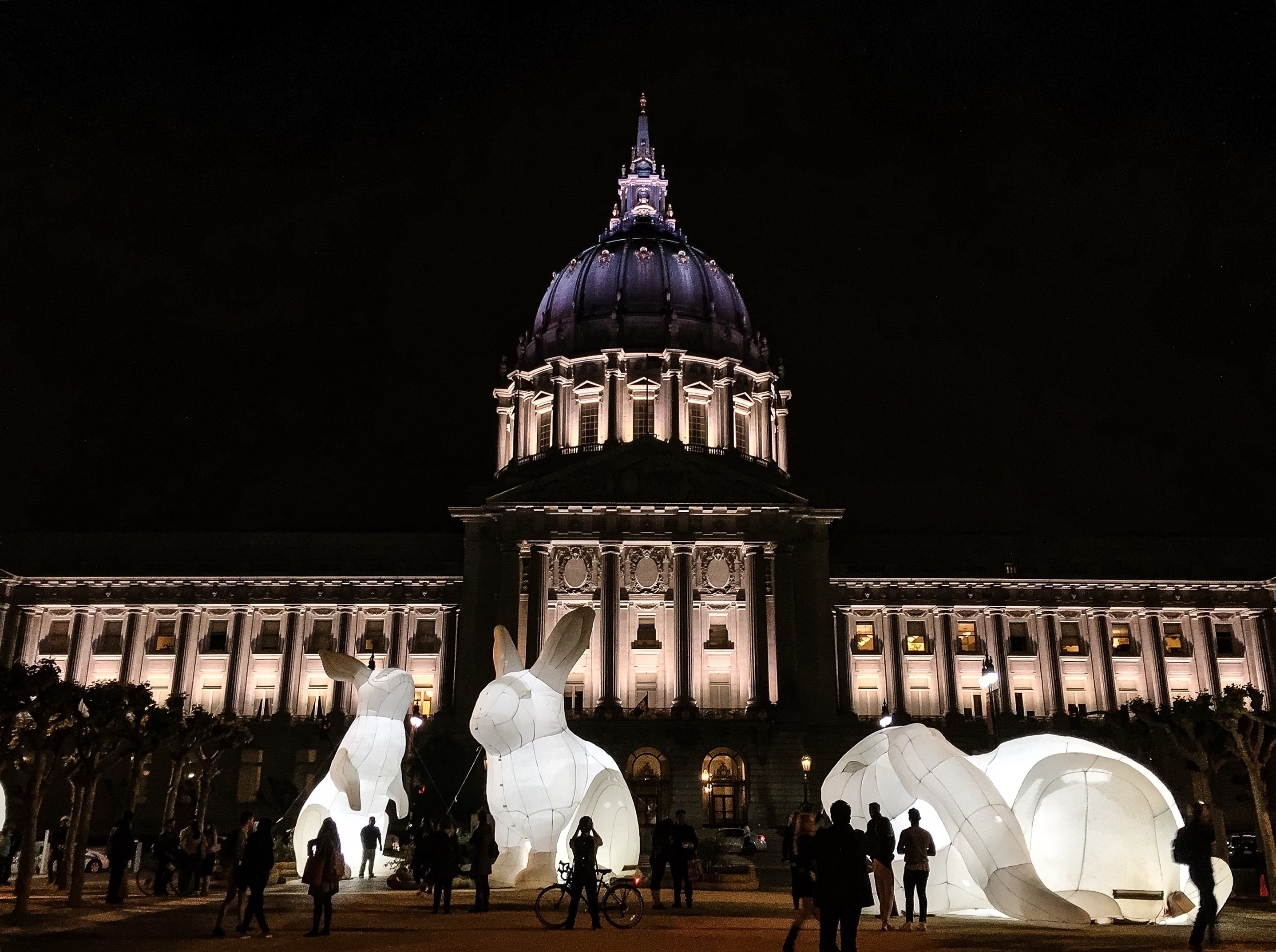
Inflatable Easter Bunny in front of San Francisco City Hall

In some traditions, the children put out their empty baskets for the Easter Bunny to fill while they sleep. They wake to find their baskets filled with candy eggs and other treats. A custom originating in Germany, the Easter Bunny is a popular legendary anthropomorphic Easter gift-giving character analogous to Santa Claus in American culture. Many children around the world follow the tradition of coloring hard-boiled eggs and giving baskets of candy. Historically, foxes, cranes and storks were also sometimes named as the mystical creatures. Since the rabbit is a pest in Australia, the Easter Bilby is available as an alternative.

== See also ==
- Divine Mercy Sunday
- Life of Jesus in the New Testament
- List of Easter films
- List of Easter hymns
- List of Easter television episodes
- List of movable Eastern Christian observances
- Regina caeli

== Footnotes ==
Sundays of the Easter cycle
Preceded by Palm Sunday	Easter; April 5, 2026	Succeeded by Second Sunday of Easter
