= Flowering the cross =

Western Christian tradition practiced at Easter

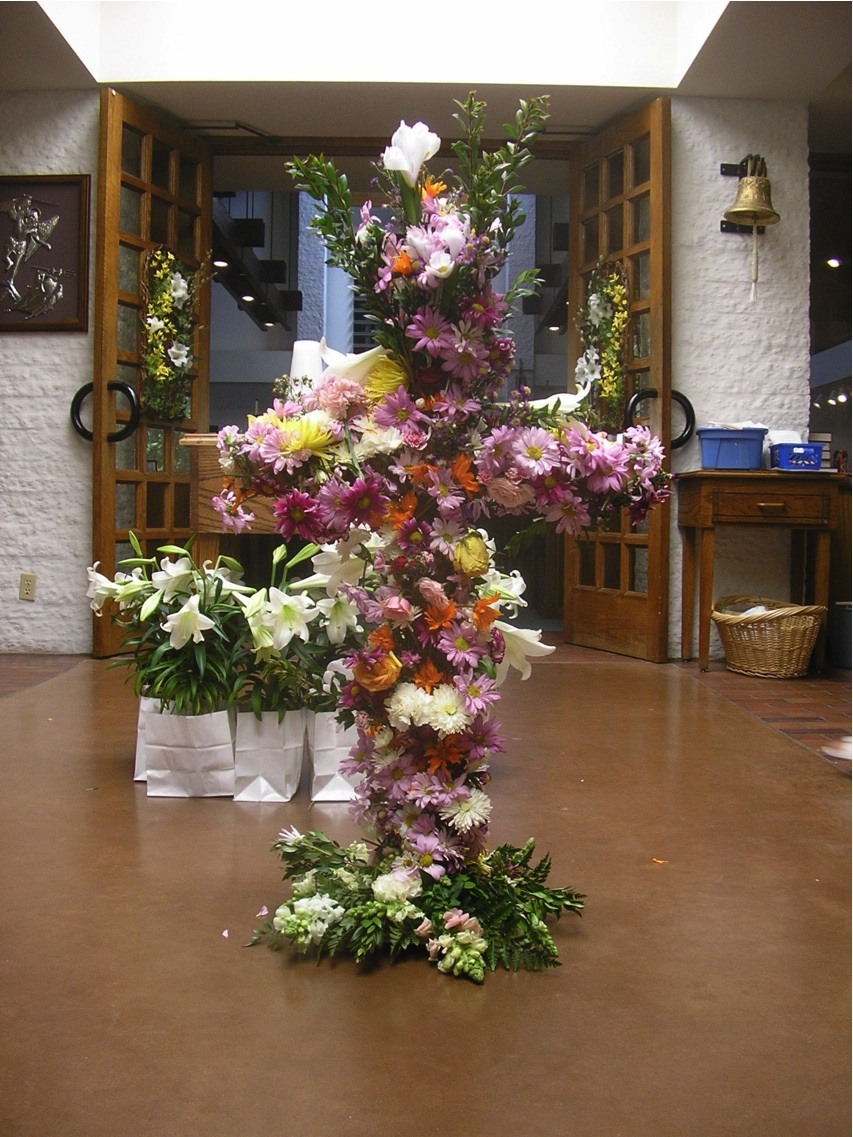
A flowered cross in a parish church (2006)

Flowering the cross is a Western Christian tradition practiced at the arrival of Easter, in which worshippers place flowers on the bare wooden cross that was used in the Good Friday liturgy, in order to symbolize "the new life that emerges from Jesus’s death on Good Friday". The result is a flowered cross that is set near the chancel for Eastertide.

== History ==
The Christian custom of flowering the cross dates back to the sixth century. It symbolizes, in Christianity, "the new life that emerges from Jesus’s death on Good Friday" as well as how "God turns darkness to light, sin into salvation." Additionally, the practice may originate in the pious belief "that the tears Mary shed at the foot of Jesus’ cross miraculously turned into flowers."

== Practice ==
Certain congregations of many Western Christian denominations, such as the Catholic, Lutheran, and Anglican churches, observe Good Friday by placing a bare wooden cross before the entrance of the chancel for worshippers to venerate during the liturgy. It is common for people to kneel before, touch, and kiss the cross in order to give "the highest honor to our Lord's cross as the instrument of our salvation".

In congregations where flowering the cross is practiced, after the Easter Vigil (which commences in the evening of Holy Saturday) church members place fresh flowers on the bare cross that was used on Good Friday in order to adorn it as Eastertide has arrived. These flowers are brought from people's homes and gardens as an offering to Jesus, though others may get flowers from a florist and bring them to the church. Some churches place lattice, such as chicken wire on the cross, in order to allow for facile placement of the flowers. While placing the flowers on the cross, it is customary for Christians to say a silent prayer. On Easter Sunday and throughout the season of Eastertide, the cross stands in a visible location near the chancel as a symbol of the risen Christ for congregants to see.

== See also ==
- Easter lily
