= Sunrise service =

Christian worship service on Easter

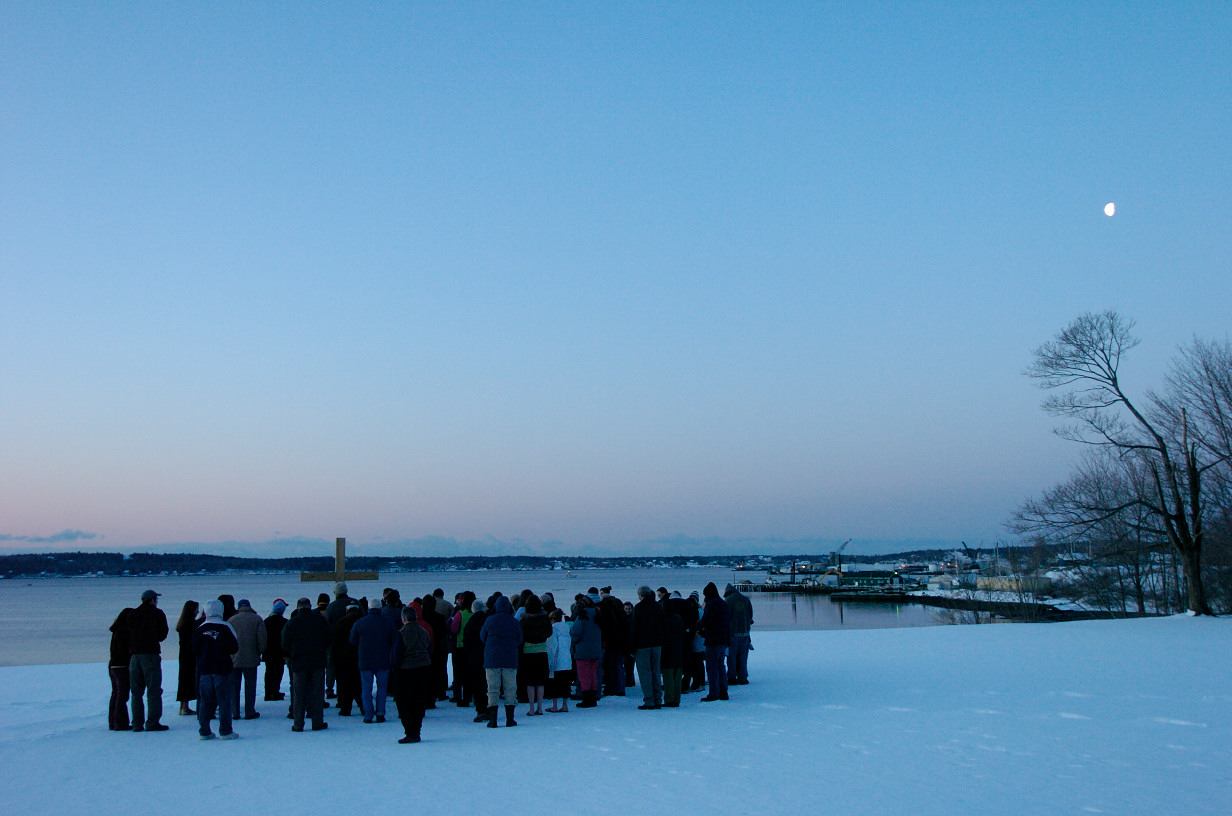
Sunrise service in Rockland, Maine

Sunrise service is a worship service specifically on Easter Sunday practiced by some Christian denominations, such as the Moravian Church. The sunrise service may take place in the church or outdoors, sometimes in a park, and the attendees are seated on outdoor chairs or benches, or else they stand throughout.

Certain congregations of the Methodist, Reformed, and United Protestant traditions observe Easter sunrise services, while others may hold an Easter Vigil service. In the Roman Catholic, Eastern Orthodox, Lutheran, and Anglican churches, this ordinarily takes the form of the Easter Vigil, which can begin in the late evening of Holy Saturday or the early morning of Easter Sunday.

== History ==
The first Easter Sunrise Service recorded took place in 1732 in the Moravian congregation at Herrnhut in the Upper Lusatian hills of Saxony. After an all-night prayer vigil, the Single Brethren—the unmarried men of the community—went to the town graveyard, God's Acre, on the hill above the town to sing hymns of praise to the Risen Saviour. The following year, the whole Congregation joined in the service. Thereafter the "Easter Morning" or "Sunrise Service" spread around the world with the Moravian missionaries. The procession to the graveyard is accompanied by the antiphonal playing of chorales by brass choirs.

== In the United States ==
Many churches in the American South still hold traditional sunrise services in cemeteries as a sign of recognition that Jesus no longer lay in the tomb on Easter morning. The service starts early in the morning and is timed so that the attendants can see the sun rise when the service is going. Services usually loosely follow the format of the church's normal service and can include music (hymns or praise band), dramatic scenes and the Easter message. After the service, the church may serve a breakfast for the attendees.

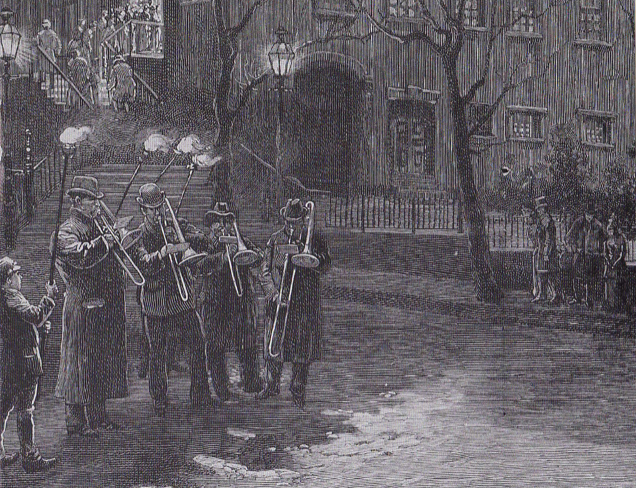
A four-trombone choir plays by torchlight on Easter Day, to announce the Moravian Easter Dawn Service in Bethlehem, Pennsylvania.

A famous Moravian sunrise service in the United States is that of the Salem Congregation in what is now Winston-Salem, NC, held annually since 1772. More than six thousand worshipers gather before dawn in front of the church to proclaim the Resurrection. The worshipers then move in procession to the historic graveyard, or "God's Acre". Brass choirs from twelve congregations, totaling over five hundred members, play hymns antiphonally during the procession. The service concludes with a proclamation of faith and hymns of hope.

In 2012, in Washington D.C., thousands of individuals gathered at the Lincoln Memorial for the ecumenical 34th “Sunrise Celebration” Easter service, a Washington tradition for Christians of all denominations. The tradition goes back for more than three decades.

Another long-running sunrise service dates back to 1944 atop Stone Mountain near Atlanta. The park opens extremely early at 4am, and the skylift operates early as well to carry worshipers to the top and back down again.

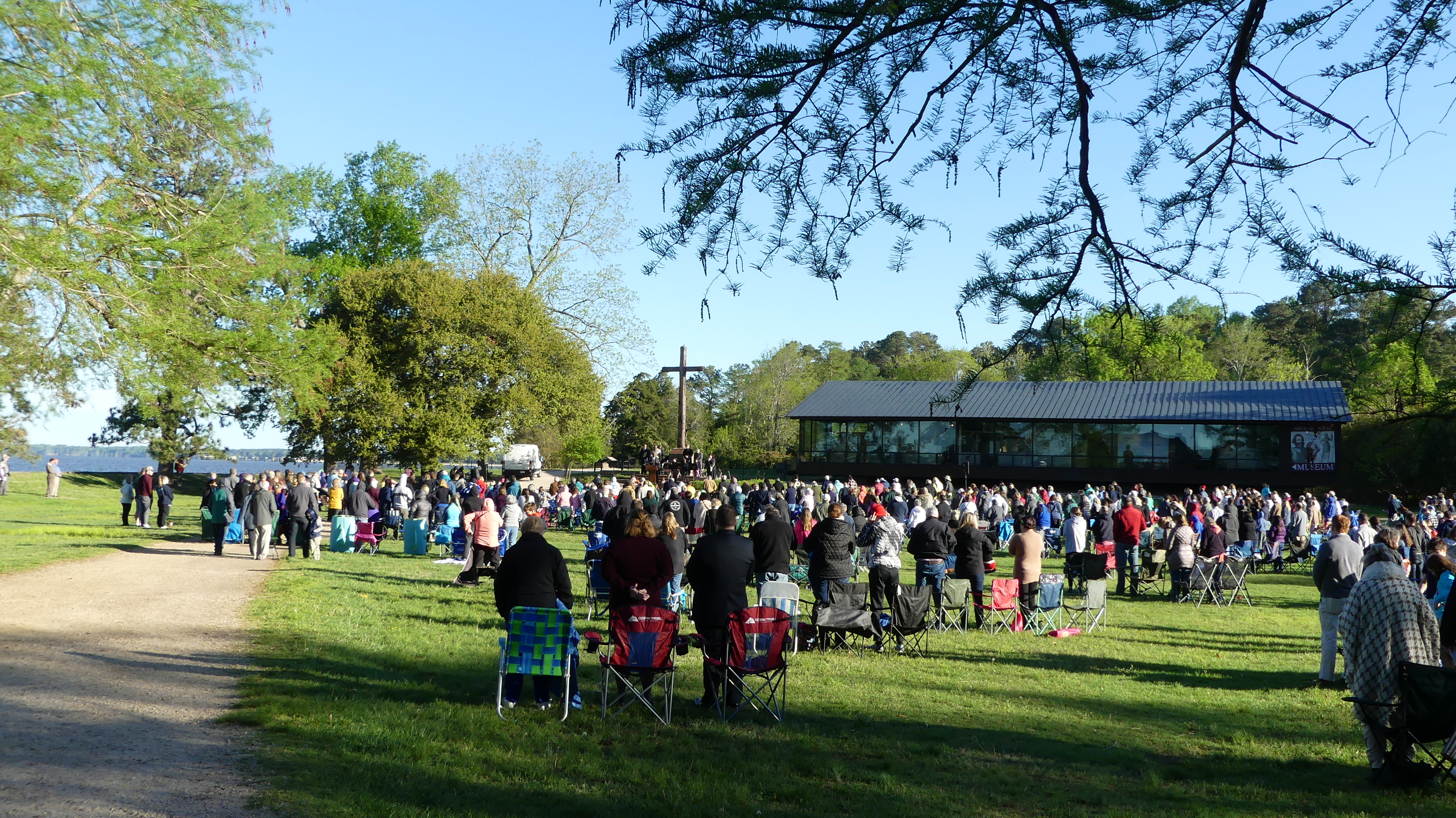
Easter Morning Sunrise Service on Jamestown Island, as seen on April 21, 2019
