= List of Sicilian dishes =

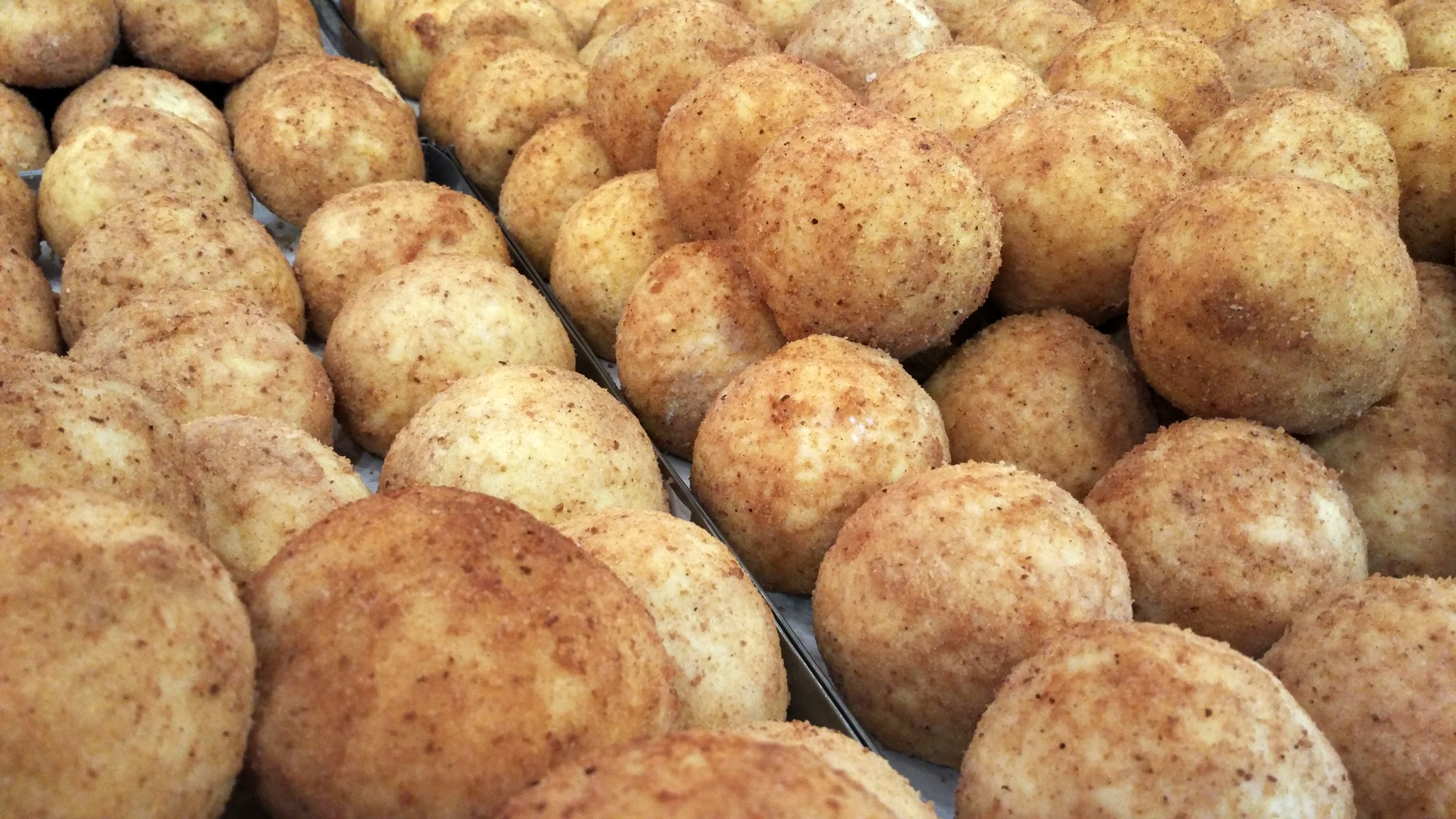
Sicilian arancini

This is a list of Sicilian dishes and foods. Sicilian cuisine shows traces of all the cultures which established themselves on the island of Sicily over the last two millennia. Although its cuisine has much in common with Italian cuisine, Sicilian food also has Spanish, Greek and Arab influences.

== Sicilian dishes ==
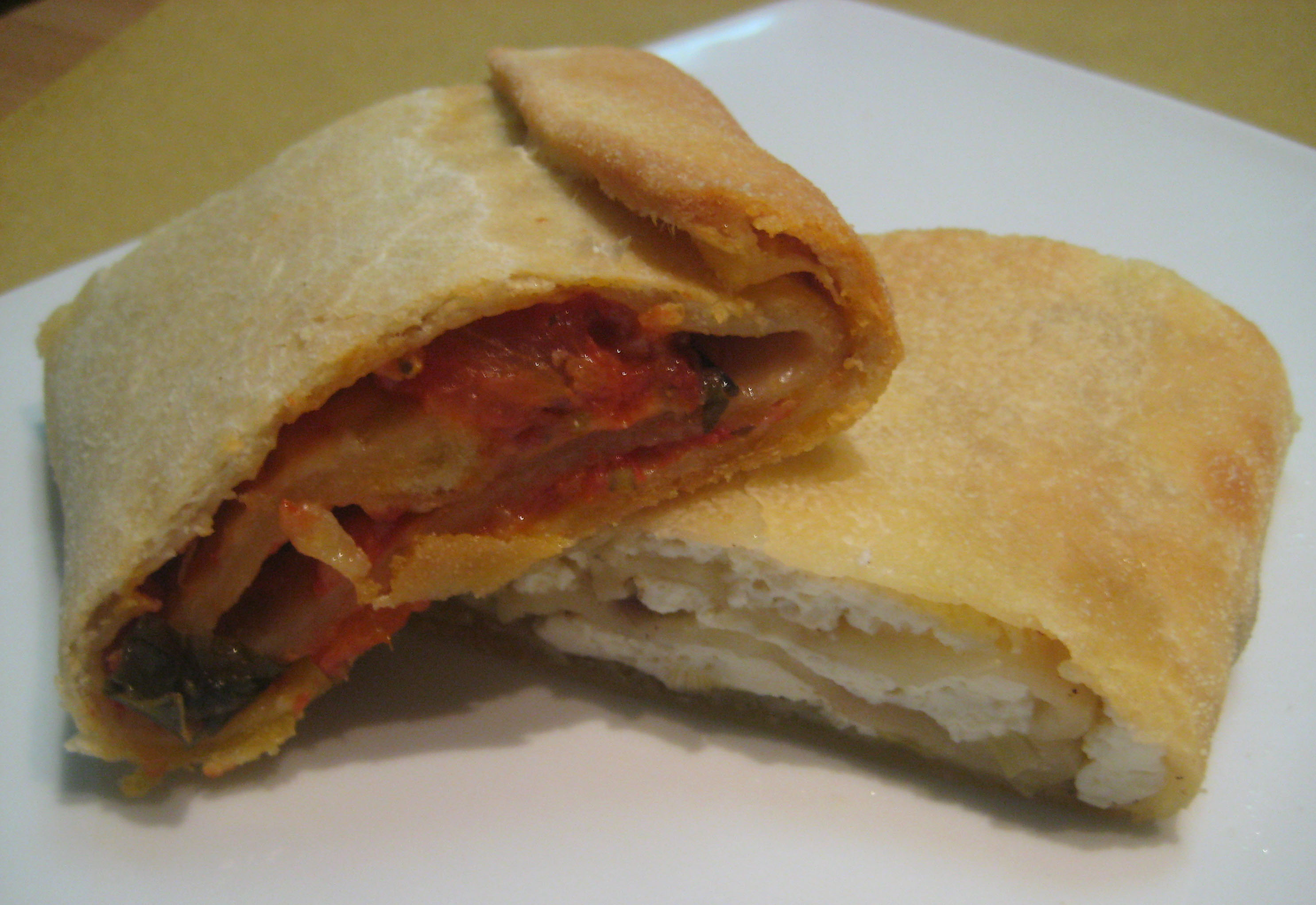
Scaccia with tomato, ricotta cheese and onion

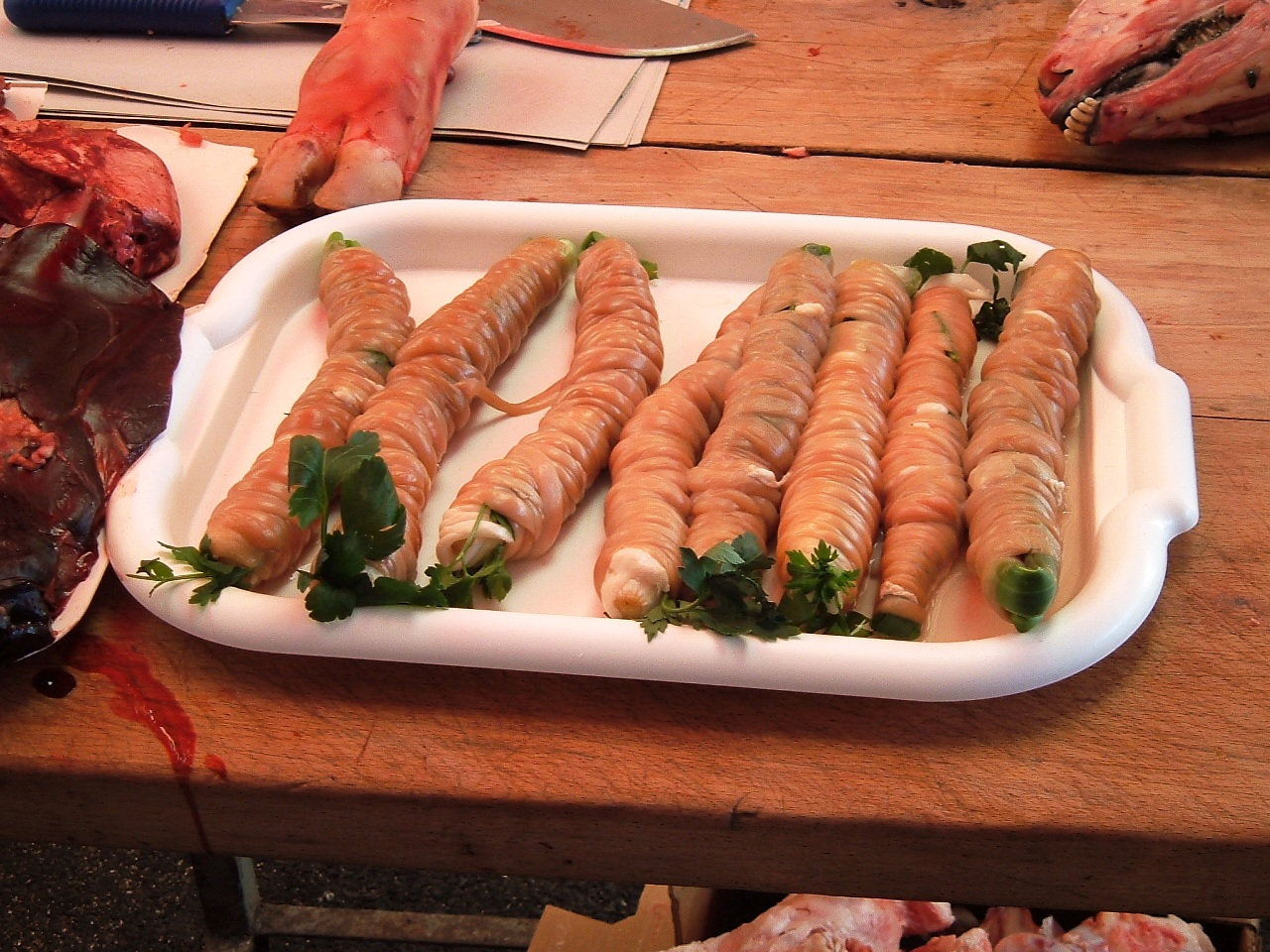
Stigghiole

Name	Image	Description
Arancini or arancine		stuffed rice balls which are coated with breadcrumbs and fried. They are said to have originated in Sicily in the 10th century during Kalbid rule.
Cannoli		shortcrust pastry cylindrical shell filled with sweetened sheep milk ricotta
Caponata		cooked vegetable salad made from chopped fried eggplant and celery seasoned with sweetened vinegar, with capers in a sweet and sour sauce
Crocchè		mashed potato and egg covered in bread crumbs and fried
Farsu magru		beef or veal slices flattened and superimposed to form a large rectangle, with a layer of thin bacon slices on top. For the filling, crushed bread slices, cheese, ham, chopped onions, garlic and fresh herbs are mixed together.
Frittula		pork and/or beef byproducts from butchering, fried in lard and spiced
Likëngë		pork sausages flavored with salt, black pepper and fennel seed (farë mbrai), made in Piana degli Albanesi and Santa Cristina Gela
Maccu		Soup with dried fava beans and fennel
Muffuletta		Sesame-seed bread, or the layered New Orleans sandwich made with it, stuffed with sausage meats, cheese, olive salad, and other ingredients
Panelle		Sicilian fritters made from chickpea flour and other ingredients. They are a popular street food in Palermo.
Pani câ meusa		Organ meats (lung, spleen) and sausage served on vastedda, a sesame-seed bun
Pasta 'ncasciata		A baked pasta dish with many varieties, but most often including macaroni, ragù, eggplant, basil, white wine, breadcrumbs, boiled eggs, soppressata or salami, caciocavallo, pecorino siciliano, and sometimes meatballs, peas, other cheeses or béchamel substituted for one of the cheeses.
Pasta alla Norma		Pasta with tomatoes, fried eggplant, ricotta and basil
Pasta ca nunnata		A Palermo pasta dish made with long pasta, a sauce of gianchetti (the whitebait of Mediterranean sardines and anchovies), olive oil, garlic, parsley, black pepper, and white wine.
Pasta â Paolina		pasta with anchovies, garlic, tomato, cinnamon, cloves, almonds, fresh basil and breadcrumbs
Pasta con le sarde		pasta with sardines and anchovies
Pesto alla trapanese		a Sicilian variation of the Genoese pesto, typical of the province of Trapani. The dish was introduced in ancient times by Genoese ships, coming from the east and stopping at the port of Trapani, who brought the tradition of agliata, a sort of pesto-sauce based on garlic and walnuts.
Pasta chi Vrocculi Arriminati		a pasta dish from Palermo which generally consists of a long pasta like spaghetti or bucatini, cauliflower, onion, raisins, anchovies, pine nuts, saffron, red chili, and breadcrumbs
Scaccia/scacciata		a thin flatbread layered with vegetables, cheese and meats and rolled up
Sicilian pizza		pizza prepared in a manner that originated in Sicily. In the United States, the phrase "Sicilian pizza" is often synonymous with thick-crust or deep-dish pizza derived from the Sicilian sfincione.
Spaghetti alla carrettiera		a dish of spaghetti pasta, with olive oil, raw garlic, chili pepper, parsley, and pecorino siciliano or breadcrumbs, and commonly tomato
Stigghiola		spiced and grilled intestine, typically from lamb or goat
Melanzane ripiene		stuffed eggplant
Orange salad		oranges, extra virgin olive oil, salt, spring onions
Couscous alla trapanese		typical of the Trapani area, with vegetables, and fish

=== Beverages ===
- Amaro Averna, a herb-citrus liqueur
- Marsala wine
- Zibibbo

=== Sodas ===
- Sibat Tomarchio
- Bibite Polara

=== Cheeses ===
- Caciocavallo and Ragusano cheese, stretched-curd cheeses similar to Mozzarella
- Canestrato, a hard cheese made from a mixture of sheep and goat milks
- Ricotta, a fresh cheese made from whey
- Pecorino siciliano – a Sicilian sheep's-milk cheese
Sicilian cheeses

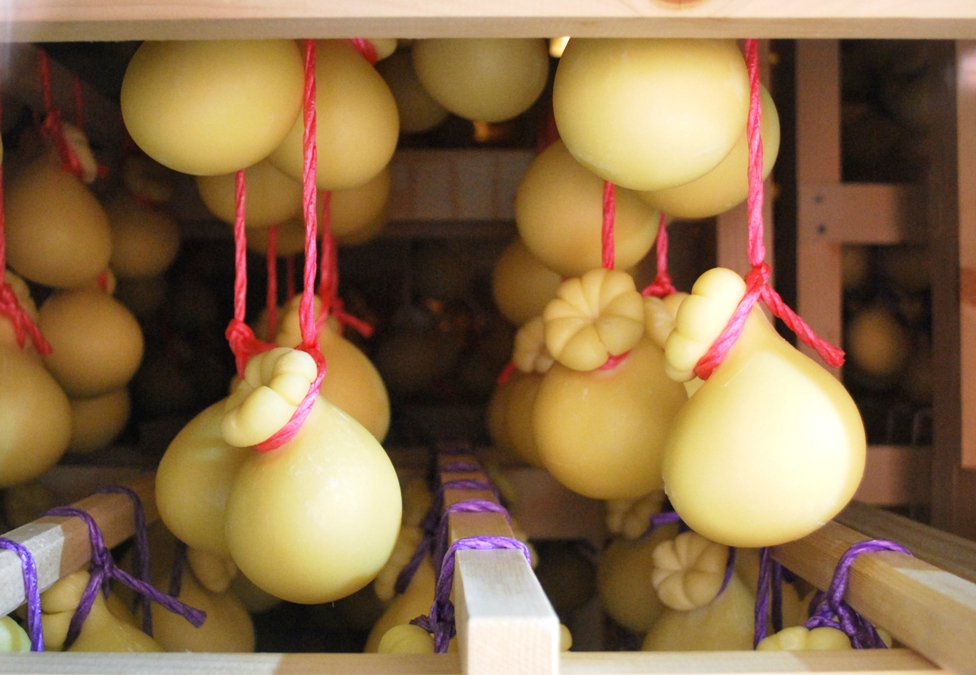
Straddled forms of caciocavallo hang to mature

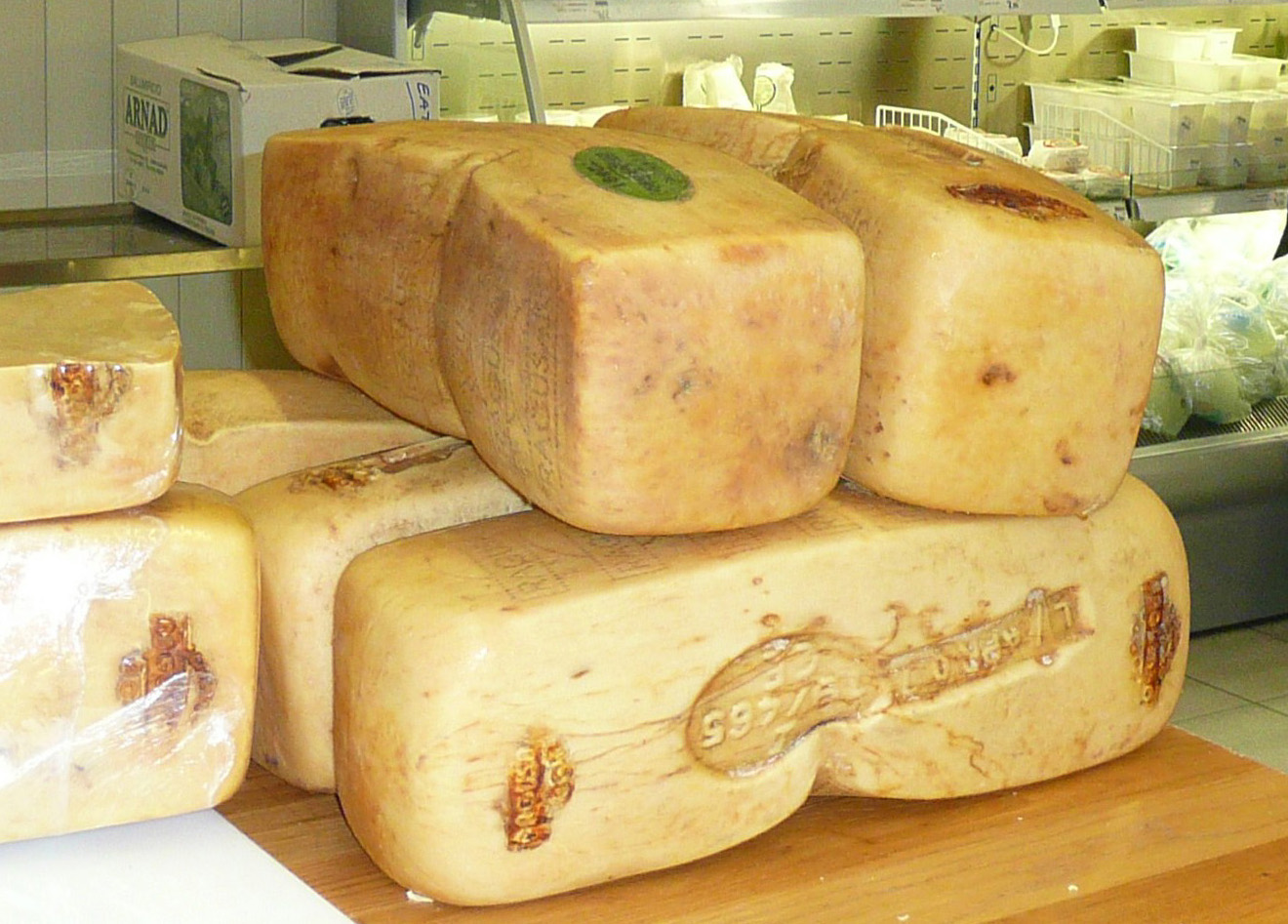
Ragusano cheese

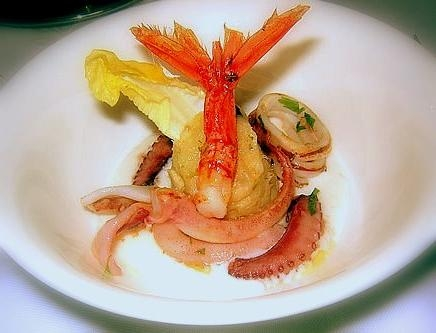
Stoccafisso alla messinese

=== Desserts and sweets ===
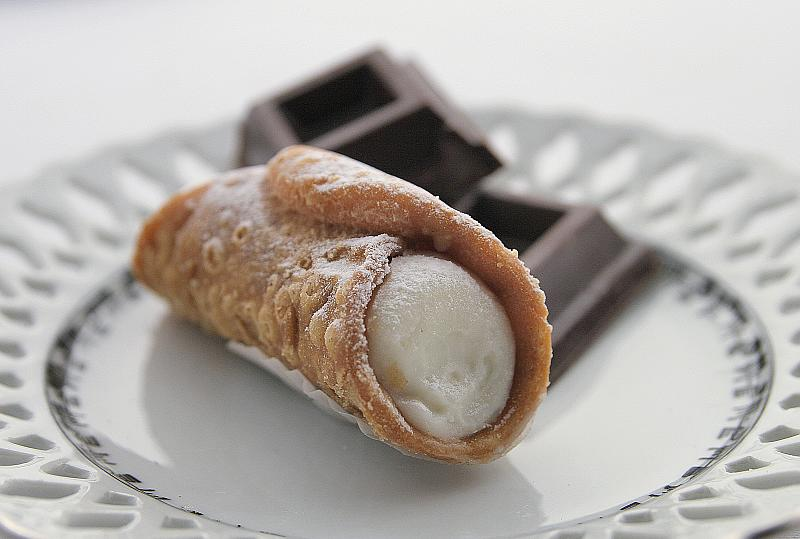
A simple cannolo sprinkled with powdered sugar

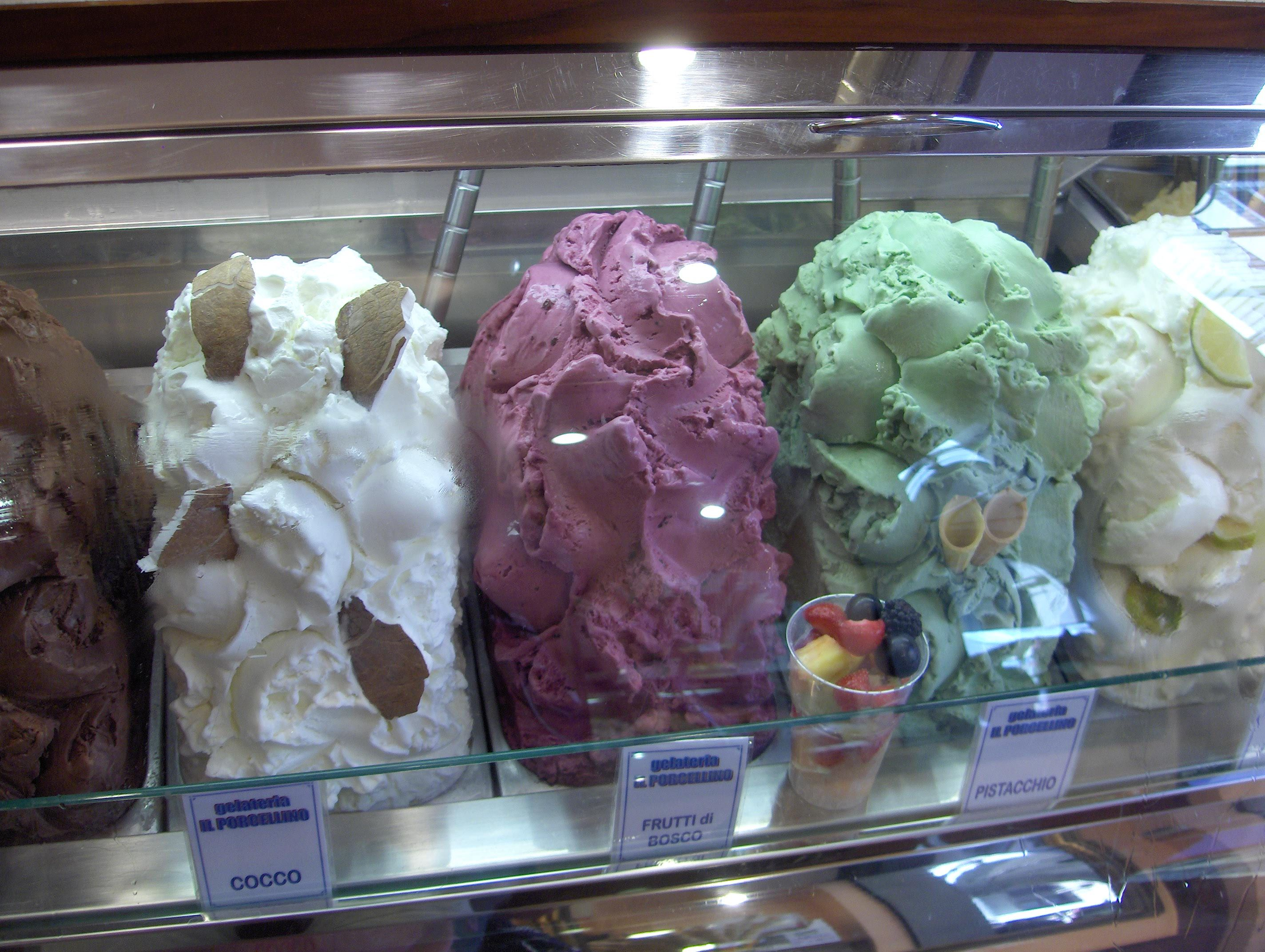
Gelato

- Biscotti regina
- Buccellato
- Cannoli
- Cassata
- Ciarduna
- Cioccolato di Modica
- Crocetta di Caltanissetta
- Cuccìa
- Cuccidati
- Frutta martorana
- Gelato
- Gelo di melone
- Giurgiulena
- Granita
- Ice cream
- 'Mpanatigghi
- 'Nzuddi
- Pignolata
- Pignolo (macaroon)
- Raffiolini
- Zeppole
Sicilian desserts and sweets

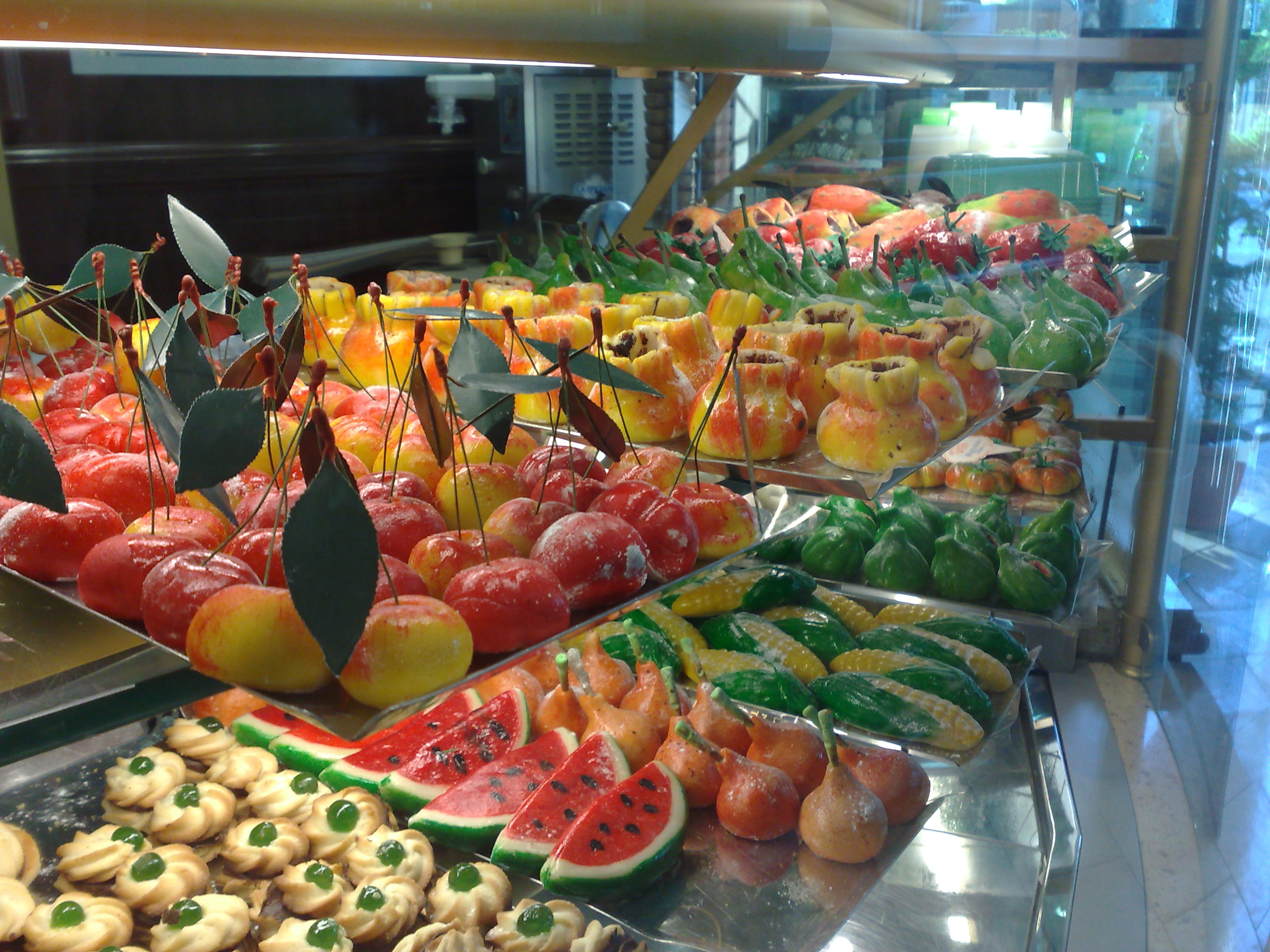
Frutta martorana

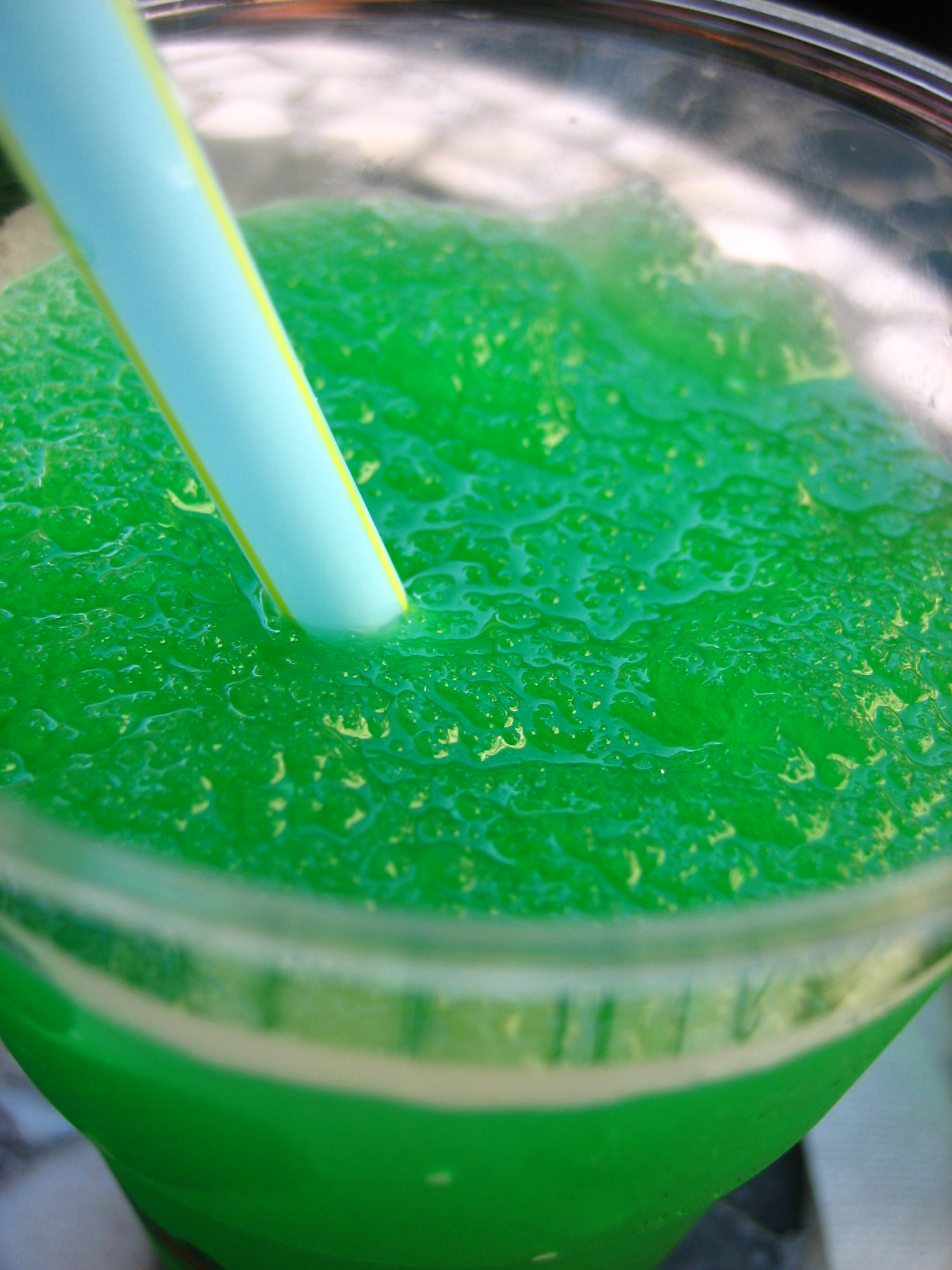
Granita di menta (lit. 'mint granita')

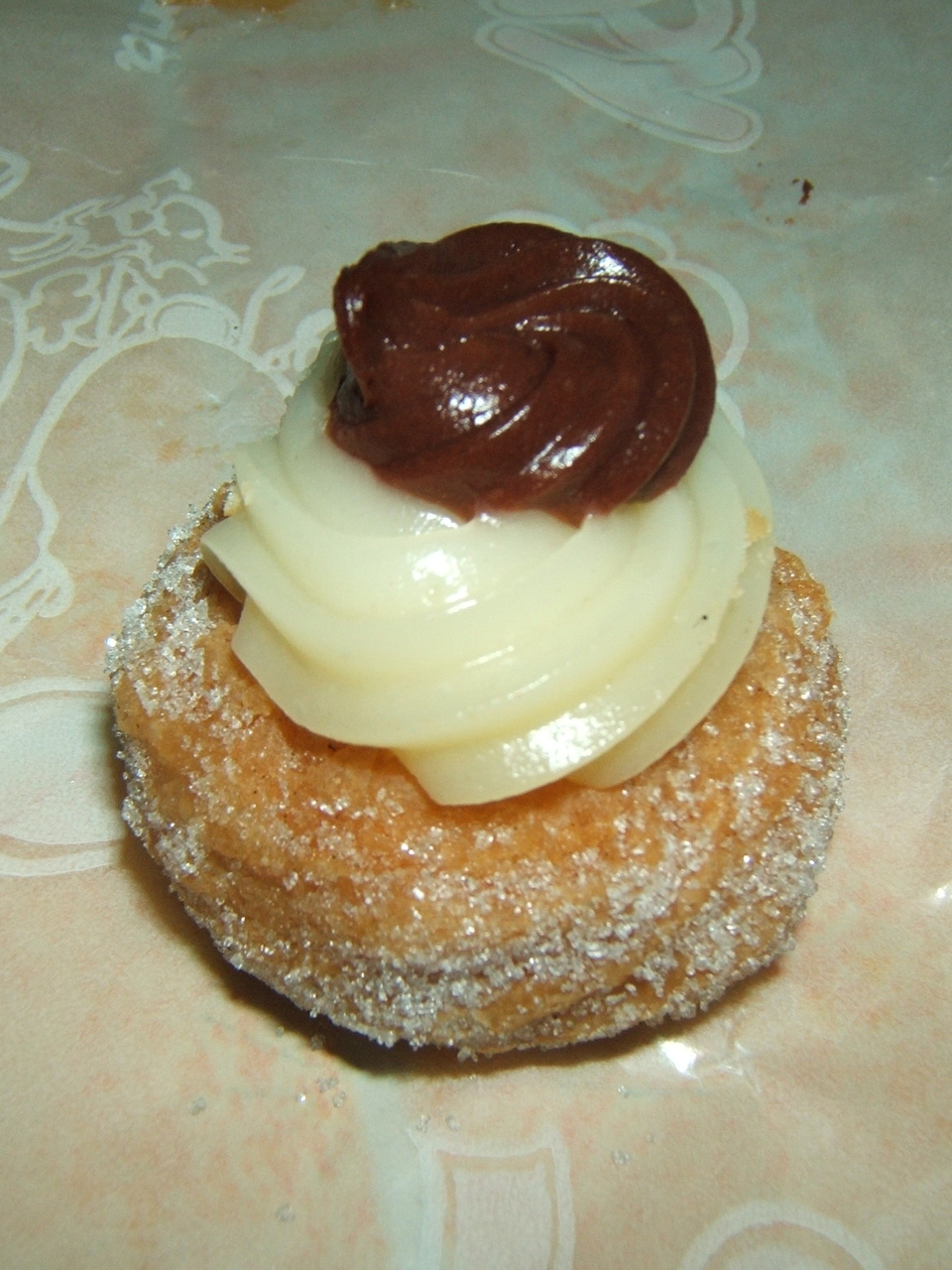
Zeppole

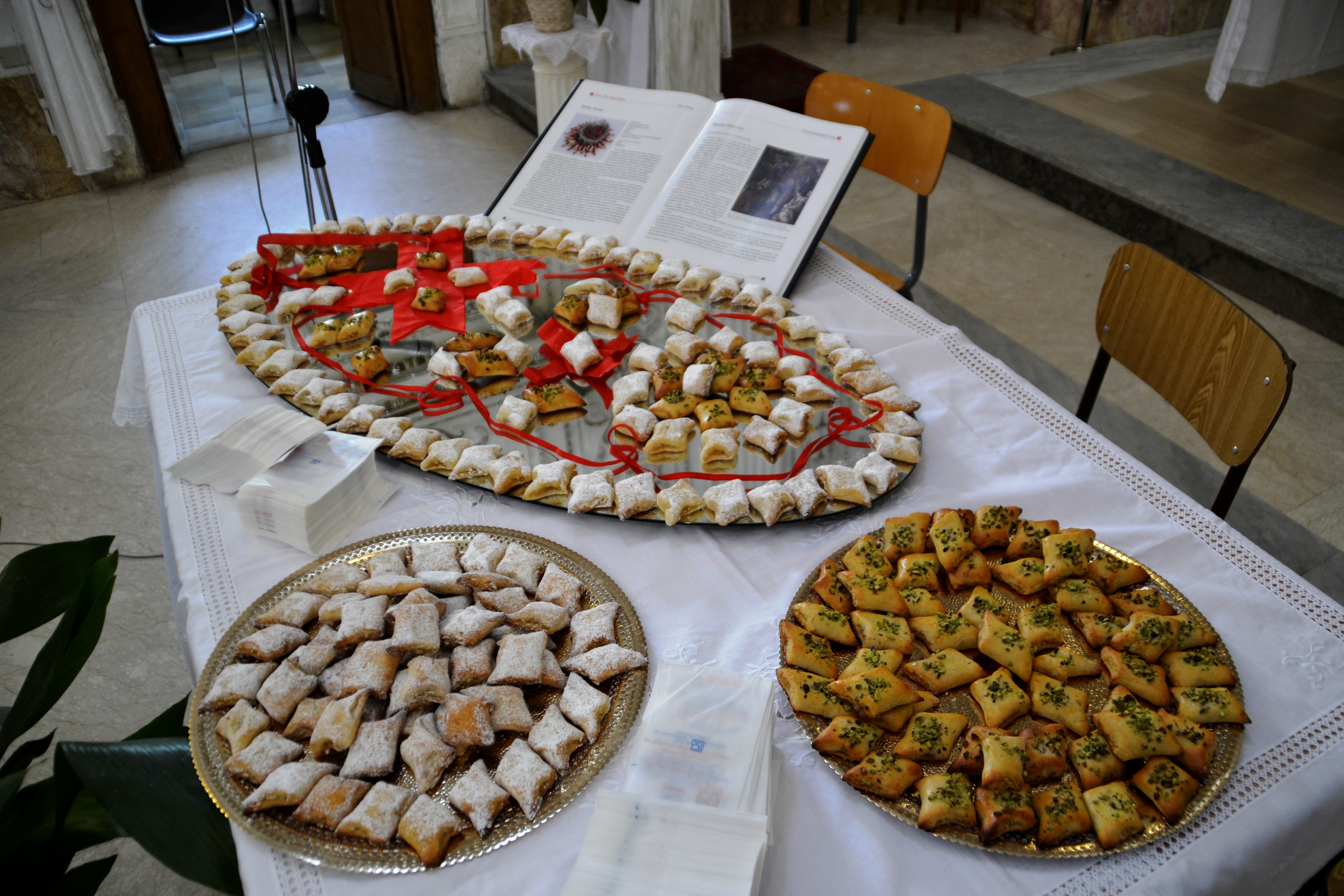
Crocette di Caltanissetta to lemon and orange left to right

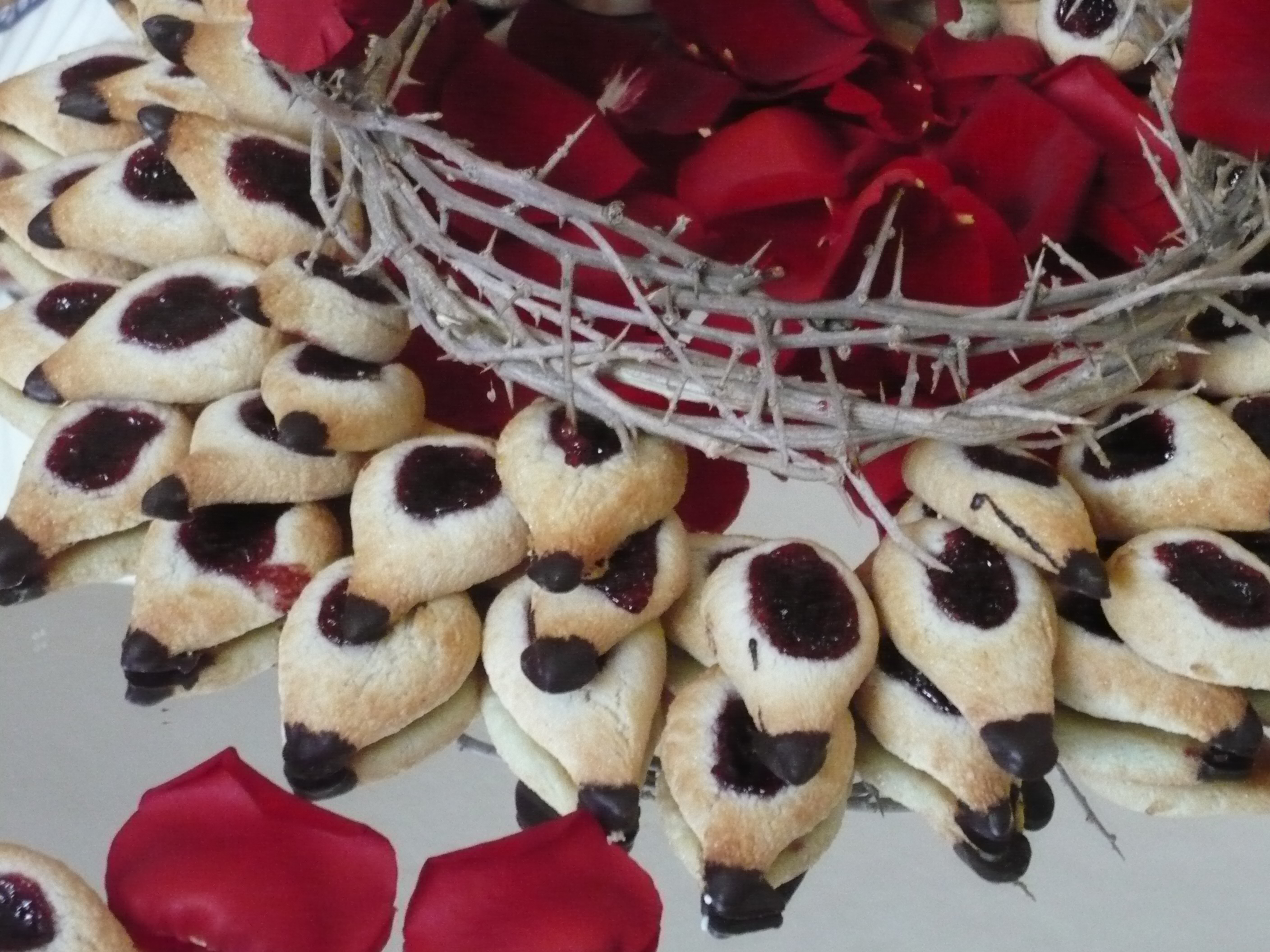
Spina santa di Caltanissetta in memory of the Passion of Christ

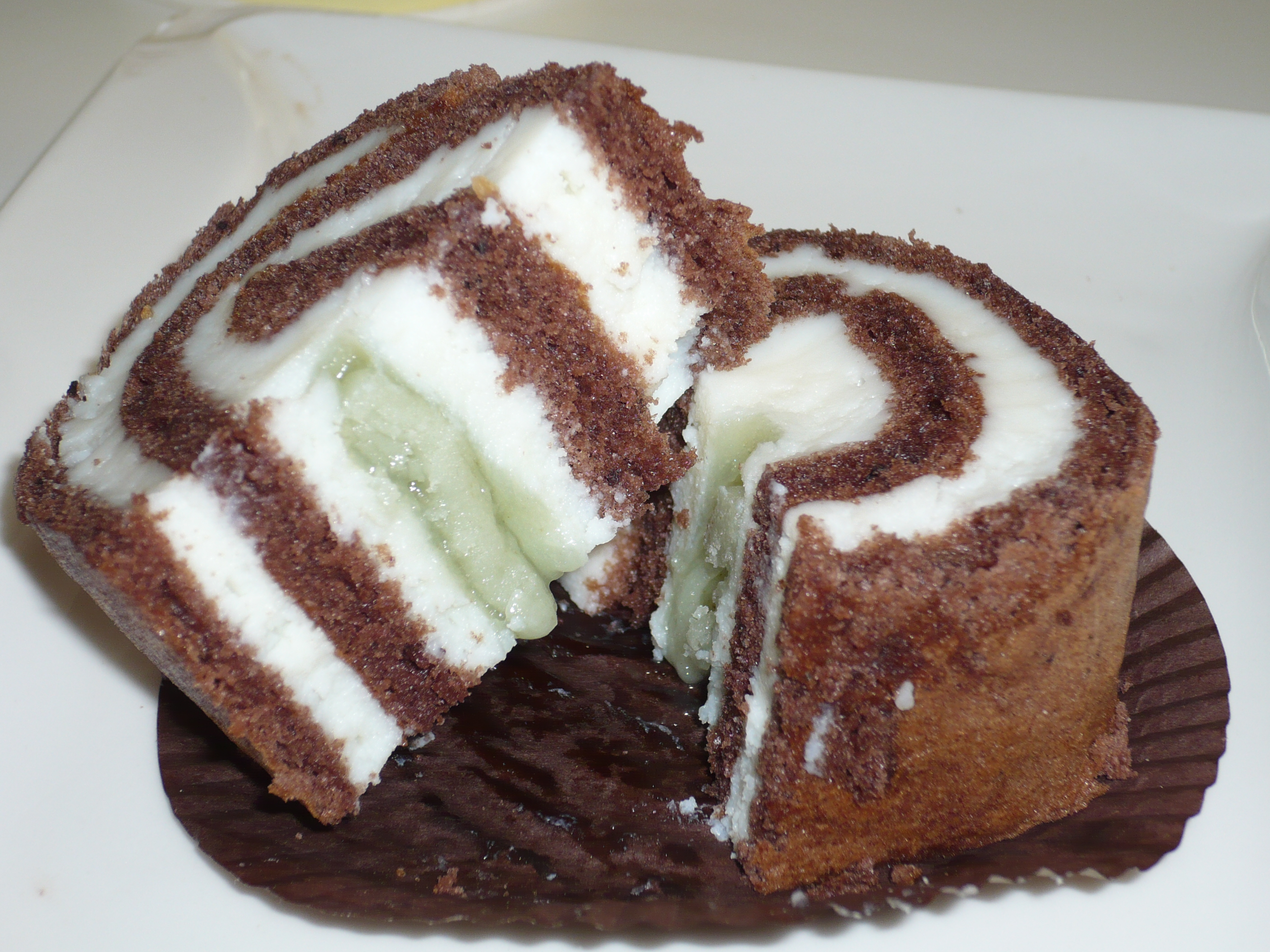
Rollò di Caltanissetta

=== Fruits and vegetables ===
- Aglio Rosso di Nubia
- Cipolla di Giarratana
- Mazzarrone (grape)
- Pomodoro di Pachino
- Siracusa lemon
Sicilian fruits and vegetables

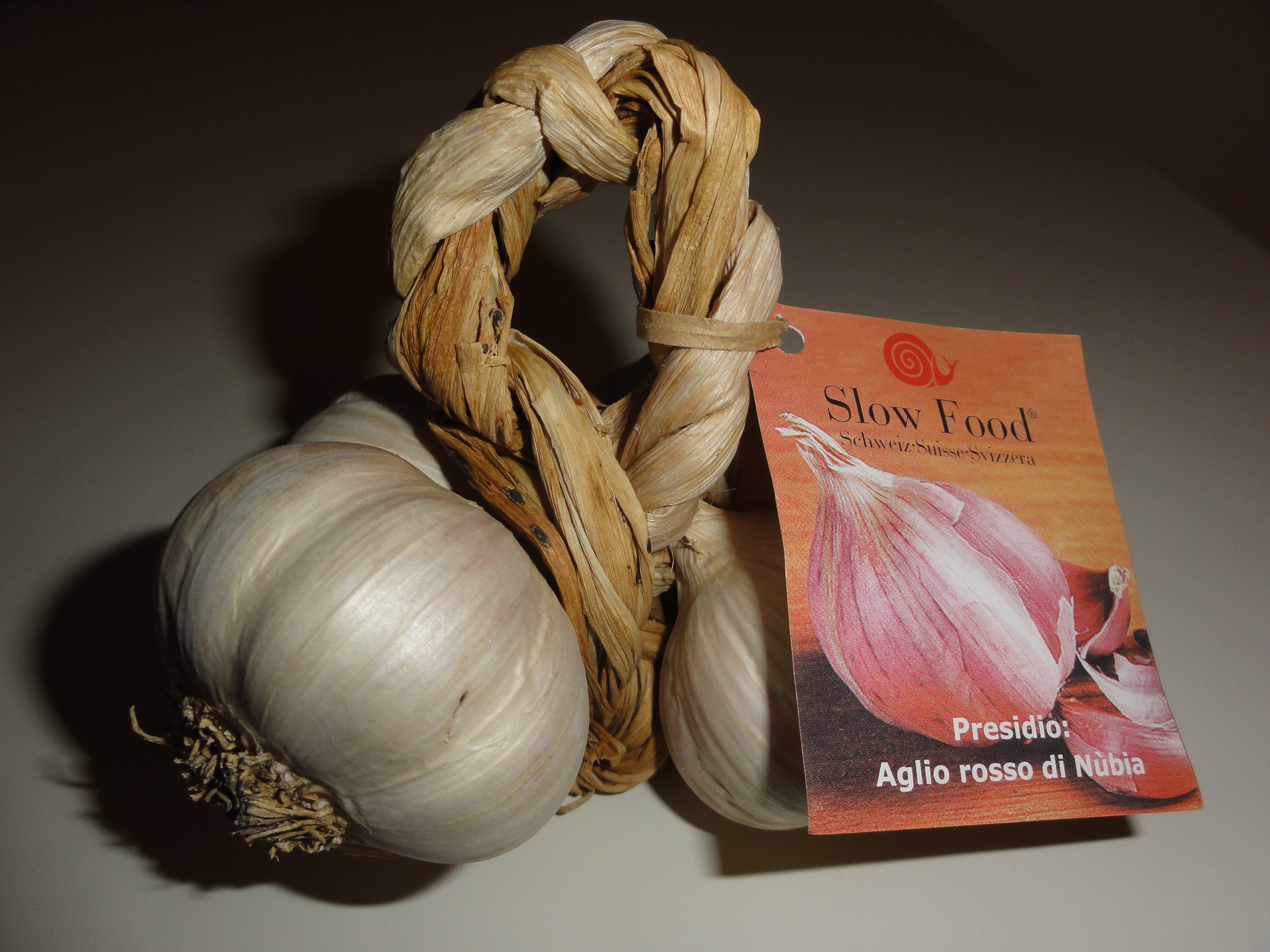
Aglio Rosso di Nubia

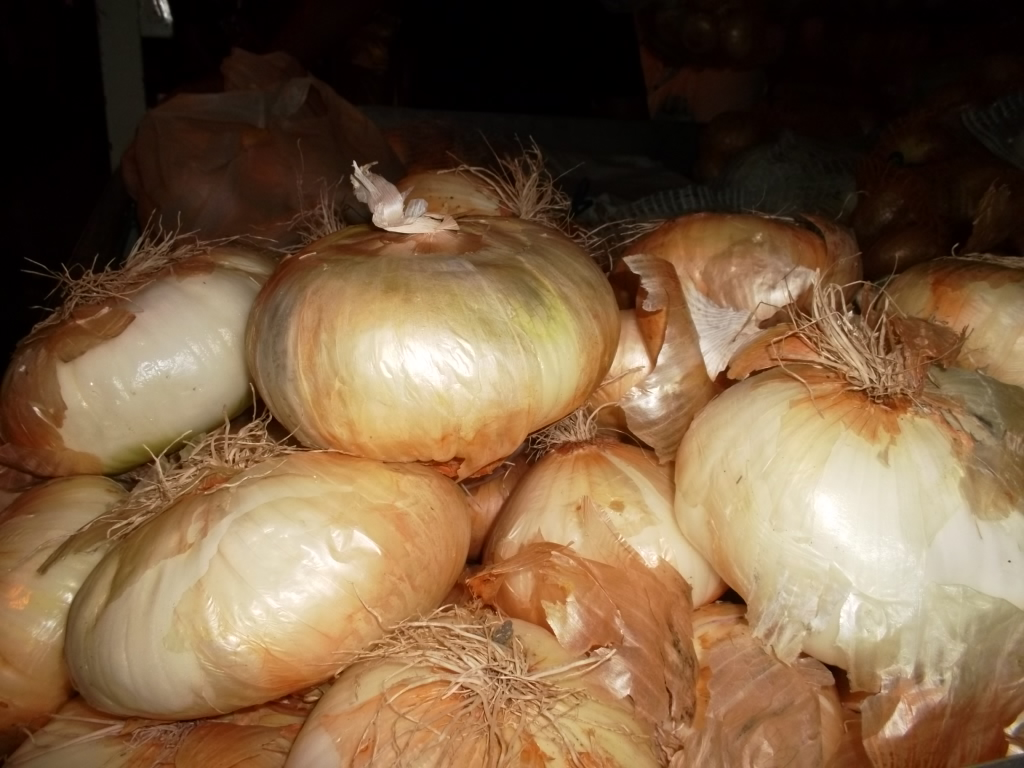
Cipolla di Giarratana

=== Salads ===
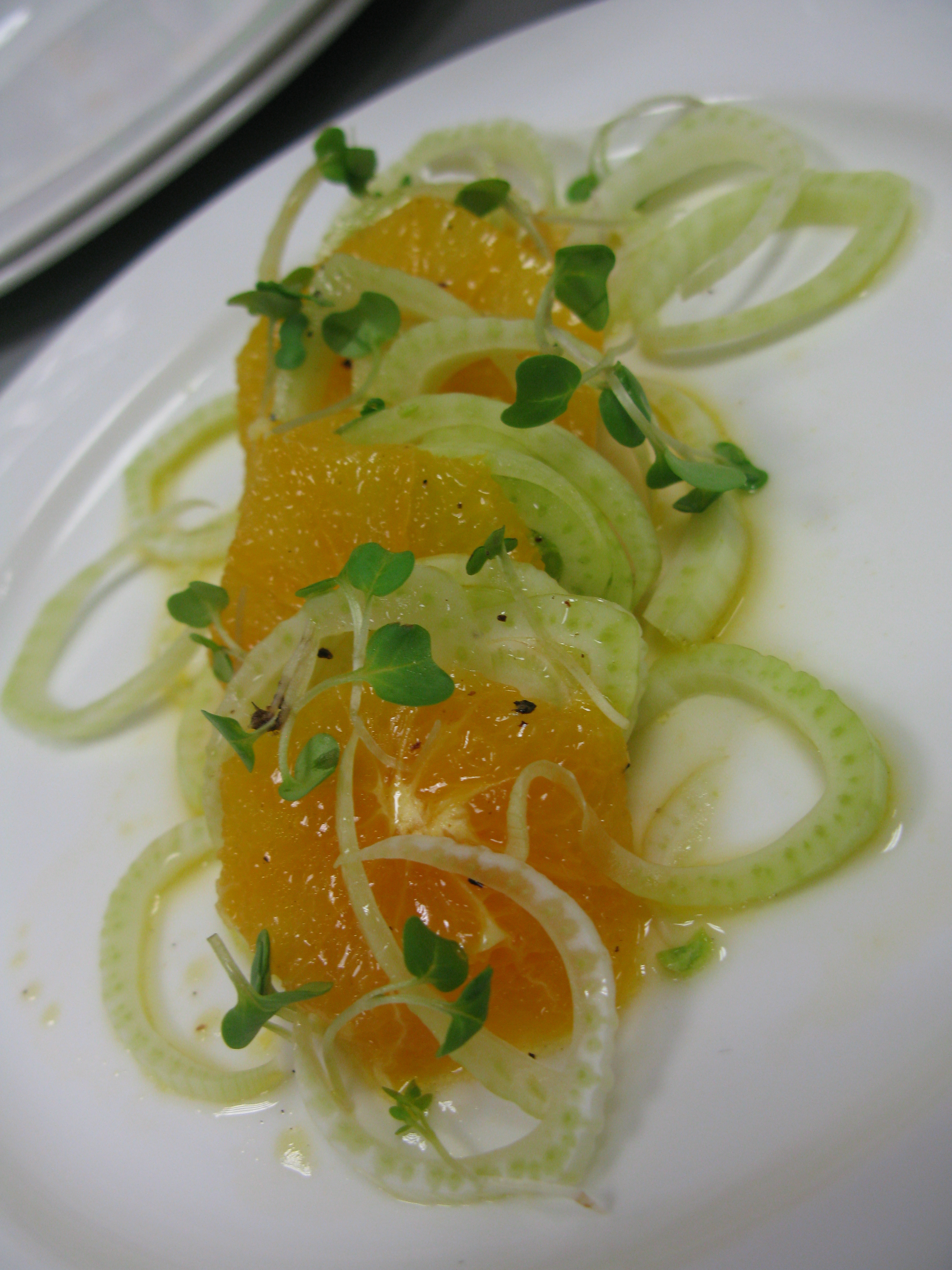
Sicilian orange salad

- Caponata – a Sicilian aubergine (eggplant) dish consisting of a cooked vegetable salad made from chopped fried eggplant and celery seasoned with sweetened vinegar, with capers in a sweet and sour sauce.
- Sicilian orange salad (insalata di arance) – a typical salad dish of Sicilian and Spanish cuisine which uses oranges as its main ingredient. It is usually served at the beginning or at the end of a meal.
- Pantelleria salad (insalata pantesca) – a salad consisting of tomatoes, boiled potatoes, red onions and mackerel (or fresh cheese) and seasoned with olive oil, oregano, salt and capers.

== See also ==
Media related to Cuisine of Sicily at Wikimedia Commons

- List of Italian dishes
- Italian cuisine
