= Bela Badia =

Italian cheese

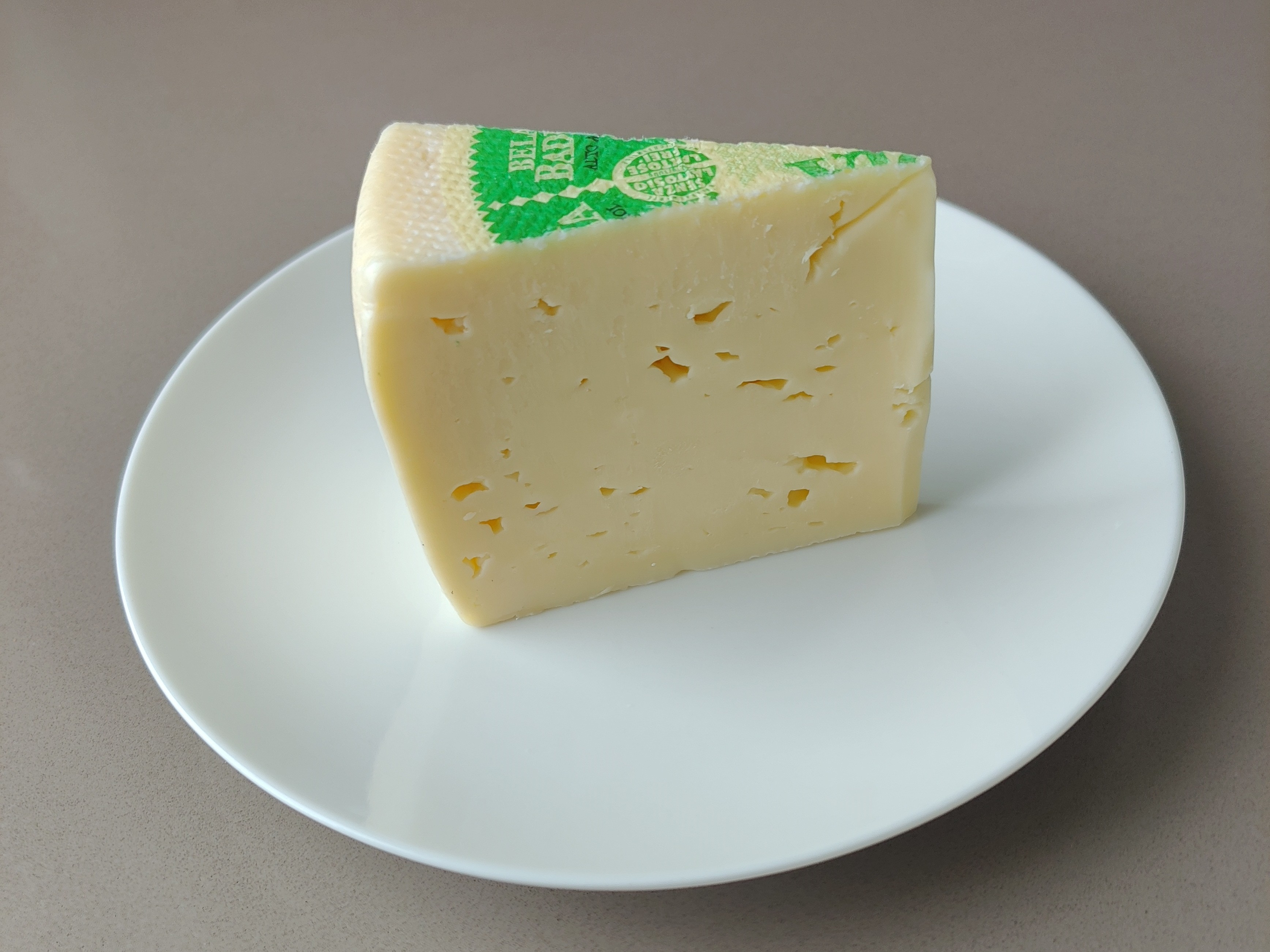
- Country of origin: Italy
- Region: Trentino-Alto Adige/Südtirol
- Town: Brunico and Puster Valley
- Source of milk: Cows
- Pasteurized: Yes
- Texture: Semi-soft
- Dimensions: Diameter: 17 cm (6.7 in); Height: 8–10 cm (3.1–3.9 in)
- Weight: 2–3 kg (4.4–6.6 lb)
- Aging time: 20-100 days
- Certification: PAT

Bela Badia is an Italian cheese made from cow's milk. It has been recognized by the Italian Ministry of Agricultural, Food and Forestry Policies as a prodotto agroalimentare tradizionale (transl. traditional agri-food product), abbreviated as PAT.

Although the name recalls the Val Badia, it is actually produced in the Puster Valley, and in particular in Brunico, with cow's whole or semi-skimmed milk from mountain farms above 1000 m above sea level.

It is a short-aged table cheese (20 to 100 days of ageing, typically 30), soft, with small, irregular holes.

== See also ==
- List of Italian cheeses
