= Pasta 'ncasciata =

Italian pasta dish

Pasta 'ncasciata is a celebratory baked pasta dish originating in the Sicilian comune (municipality) of Messina; however, today there are numerous versions from every province of Sicily and Calabria. Ingredients vary according to the region as well as personal preferences. For example, while the dish usually uses two types of cheese, béchamel sauce may be used in lieu of one of the cheeses. It was traditionally baked in a dish placed over, as well as covered by, hot coals. The dish was made more well known by Andrea Camilleri's Inspector Montalbano.

== Variants ==
=== Messina ===
The version from Messina is one of the most common, and is generally made with maccheroni pasta, ragù, fried eggplant, caciocavallo (casciucavaddu in the Sicilian language), pecorino siciliano, white wine, basil and often additional ingredients such as soppressata, meatballs, salami, boiled eggs, peas and breadcrumbs.

=== Ragusa ===
The version from Ragusa contains peas, crumbled sausage and ricotta cheese.

=== Palermo ===
The version from Palermo substitutes tomato sauce for ragù.

=== Enna ===
The Enna version is the most different from the others as it does not use ragù, eggplant or caciocavallo. Instead it uses cauliflower, pecorino siciliano, sausage and other ingredients.

=== Syracuse ===
The Syracuse version is most similar to the versions from neighboring provinces of Ragusa and Enna, as it omits the ragù, eggplant and caciocavallo as well, but instead uses ricotta, pecorino siciliano, cauliflower and eggs poured over the dish before baking.

=== Caltanisetta ===
In Gela, in the province of Caltanissetta, cauliflower is also sometimes used instead of eggplants, and anchovies are sometimes added.

=== Calabria ===
The version from Calabria is most similar to the Messina version made with maccheroni pasta, ragù, meatballs, boiled eggs, fried eggplant, caciocavallo or provola silana, pecorino siciliano and often additional ingredients such as soppressata, meatballs, salami, boiled eggs and breadcrumbs.

== See also ==
- Sicilian cuisine
- List of pasta
- List of pasta dishes
