= Caponata =

Sicilian eggplant dish

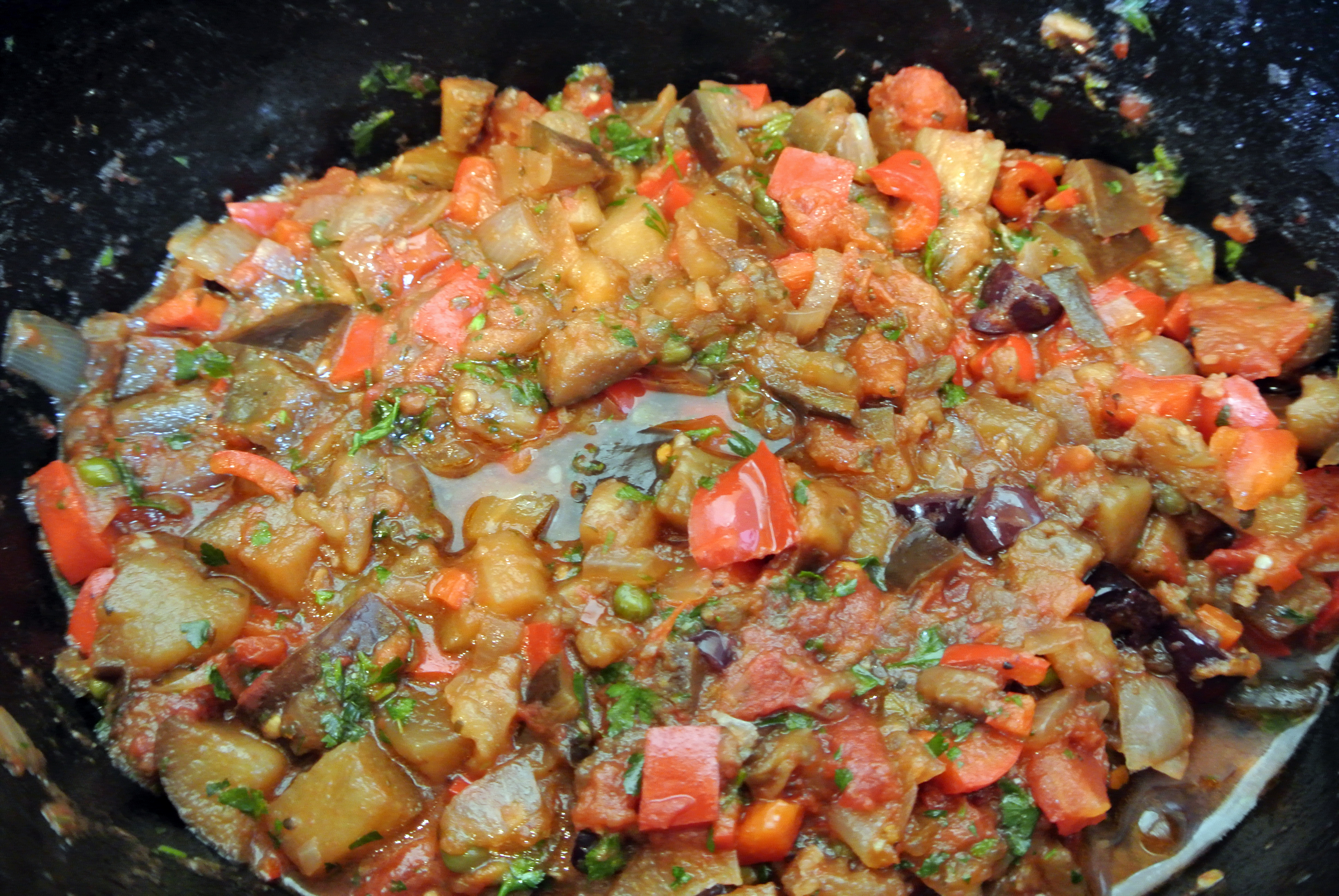
- Alternative names: Capunata
- Type: Salad
- Place of origin: Italy
- Region or state: Sicily
- Main ingredients: Eggplant
- Ingredients generally used: Celery

Caponata (Sicilian: capunata) is a Sicilian dish consisting of chopped, fried eggplant and other vegetables, seasoned with olive oil, tomato sauce, celery, olives, and capers, in an agrodolce (sweet and sour) sauce.

Variants add carrots, bell peppers, potatoes, pine nuts, and raisins. A Palermo version adds octopus, and an aristocratic recipe includes lobster and swordfish garnished with wild asparagus, grated dried tuna roe and shrimp. These are exceptions to the general rule of a sweet and sour cooked vegetable stew or salad. In Naples, similar dishes include sweet and sour eggplant.

Caponata is historically associated with Sicily's Jewish community, and is sometimes still referred to as caponata alla giudia.

The etymology of the name is not reliably known. Some suggest it derives from the Catalan language, others that it comes from the caupone, the sailors' taverns. The dishes described by Wright would suggest that in the past the Sicilian dish was similar to the Genoese capponata.

== See also ==
- List of Sicilian dishes
- List of stews
- List of eggplant dishes
- Ajapsandali
  - Eggplant salads and appetizers
