= Aglio Rosso di Nubia =

Sicilian garlic variety

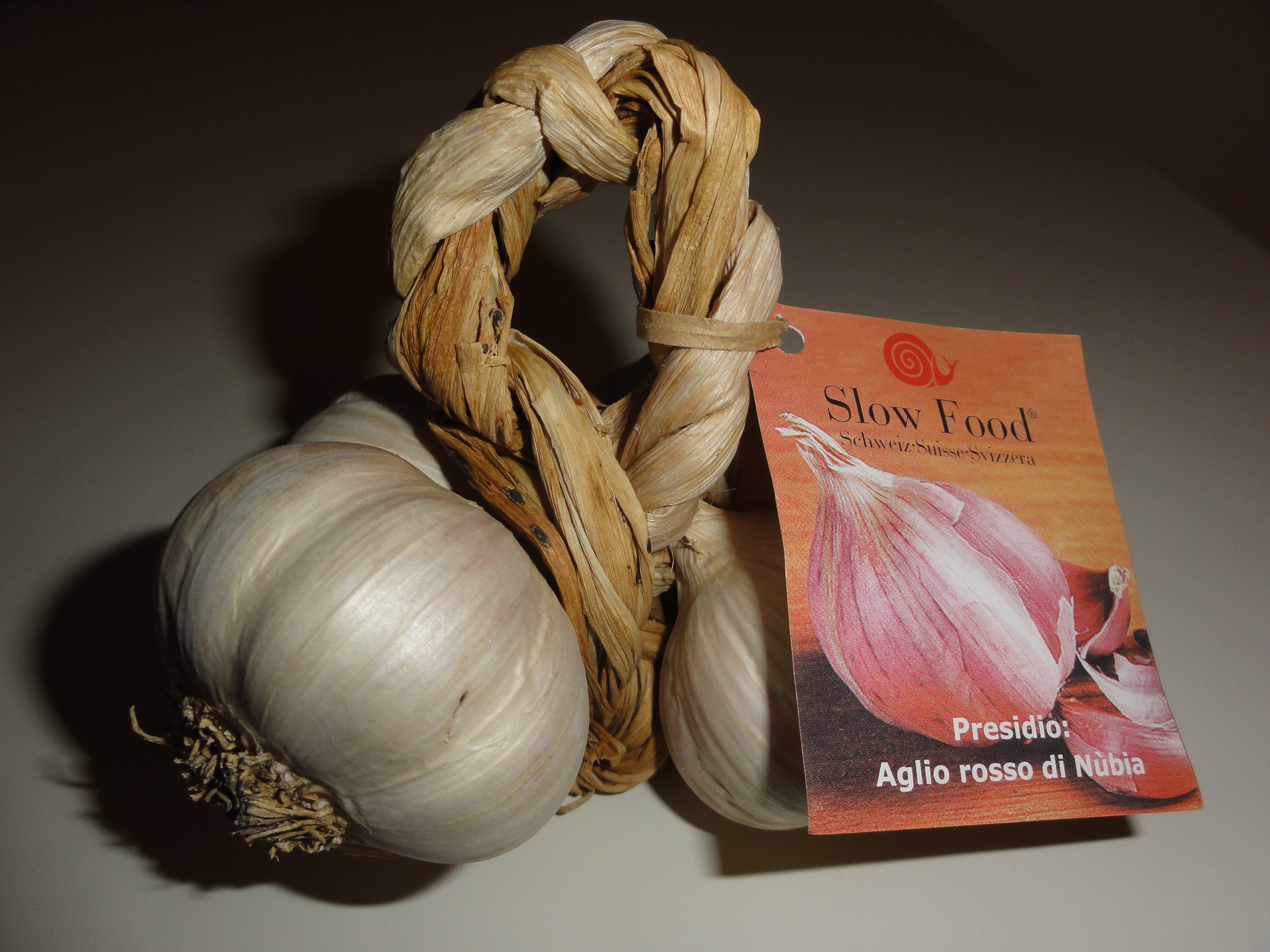
Aglio Rosso di Nubia

The Aglio Rosso di Nubia (Nubia Red Garlic), also known as Aglio di Paceco (Paceco Garlic) and Aglio di Trapani (Trapani Garlic), is a Sicilian variety of garlic, characterized by the intense purple color of the robes of its bulbils. It is mainly cultivated in Nubia, a fraction of the comune of Paceco, in the Province of Trapani. In less extent, it is also cultivated in the neighboring municipalities of Trapani, Erice, Buseto Palizzolo, Valderice, Marsala and Salemi.

The cultivation takes place on dark, dry and loamy soils, in rotation with Paceco yellow melon (a local variety of melon also known as cartucciaro), vicia faba and durum, in order to avoid the over-exploitation and the subsequent impoverishment of the soils. The sowing takes place between December and January, while the harvest takes place in the months of May and June in the evening and at night, because the increased moisture of the leaves facilitates the braiding of the bulbs. For the same purpose, before harvest the inflorescence of the plant (spicuna in local dialect) is removed.

It has a bulb consisting of an average of twelve cloves, with the outer tunics of white colour and the bulbil tunics of a bright red colour. Analysis carried out by the Faculty of Agriculture at the University of Palermo showed that the Nubia red garlic has a content of allicin well above average. This gives it a particularly intense flavor.

It is listed as a traditional Italian food product (P.A.T.) by the Ministry of Agricultural, Food and Forestry Policies.
