= Stigghiola =

Italian meat dish originating from Sicily

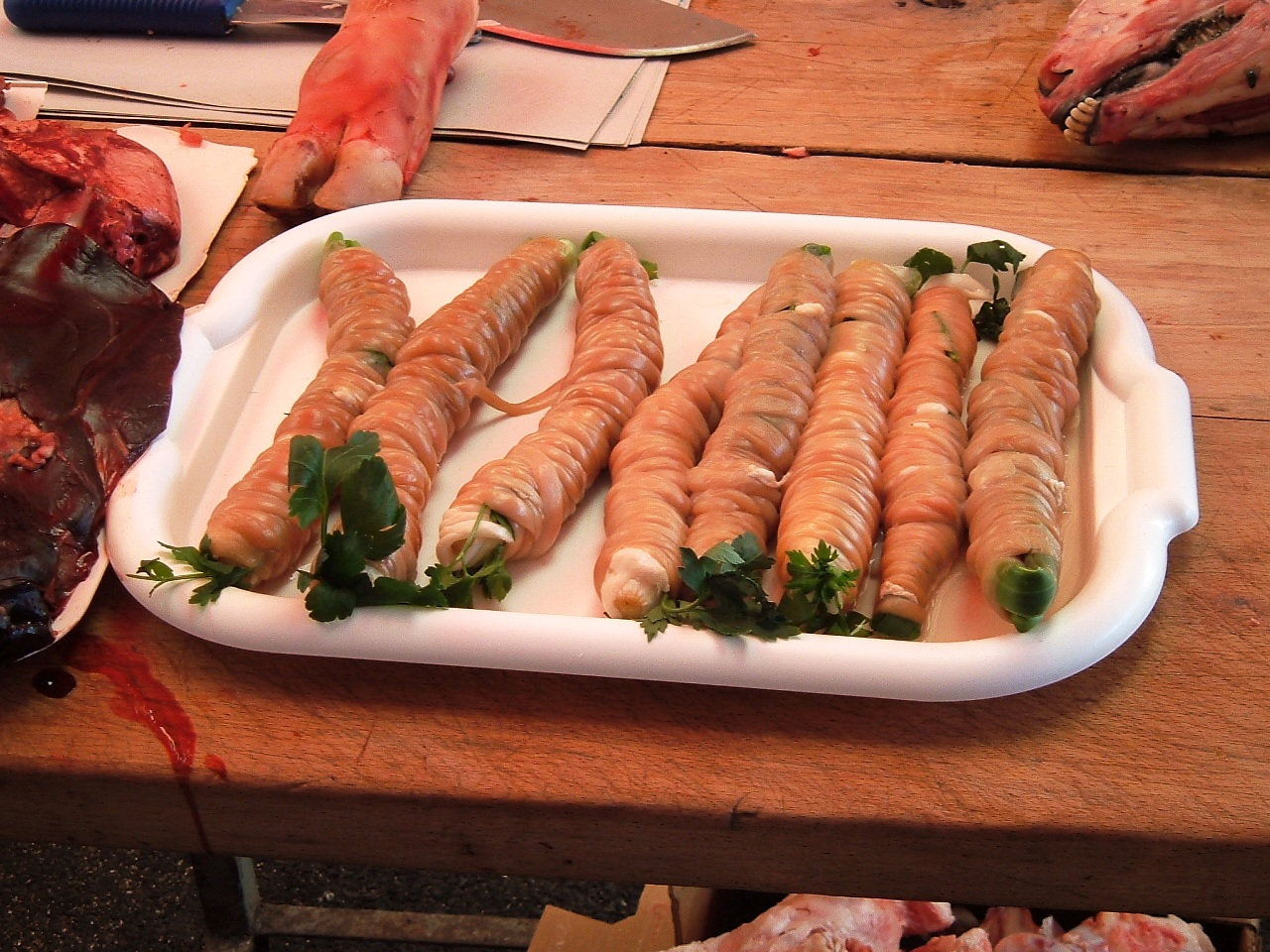
Raw stigghiole

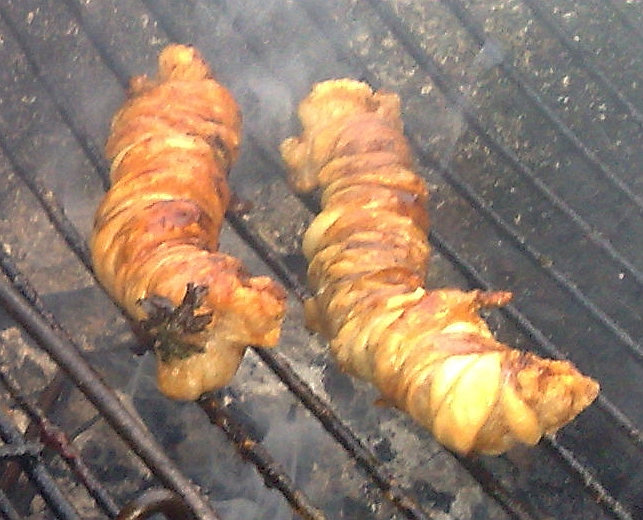
Stigghiola being cooked

The stigghiola (pl.: stigghiole in Italian or stigghioli in Sicilian), also known as stigghiuola, is a Sicilian food typical of the streets of the city of Palermo. It consists of guts (usually of lamb, but also of goat or chicken) which are washed in water and salt, seasoned with parsley and often with onion and other pot herbs, then stuck on a skewer or rolled around a leek, and finally cooked directly on the grill. The dish is generally prepared and sold as a street food. In Ragusa, the dish is baked in a casserole and is known as turciniuna.

It is listed as a prodotto agroalimentare tradizionale (PAT) by the Ministry of Agricultural, Food and Forestry Policies.

Stigghioli have become very popular among Sicilian Americans in Brooklyn, New York, specifically in Gravesend and Bensonhurst, and are served at many summer barbecues.

== See also ==
- Sicilian cuisine
