= 'Nzuddi =

Italian cookies

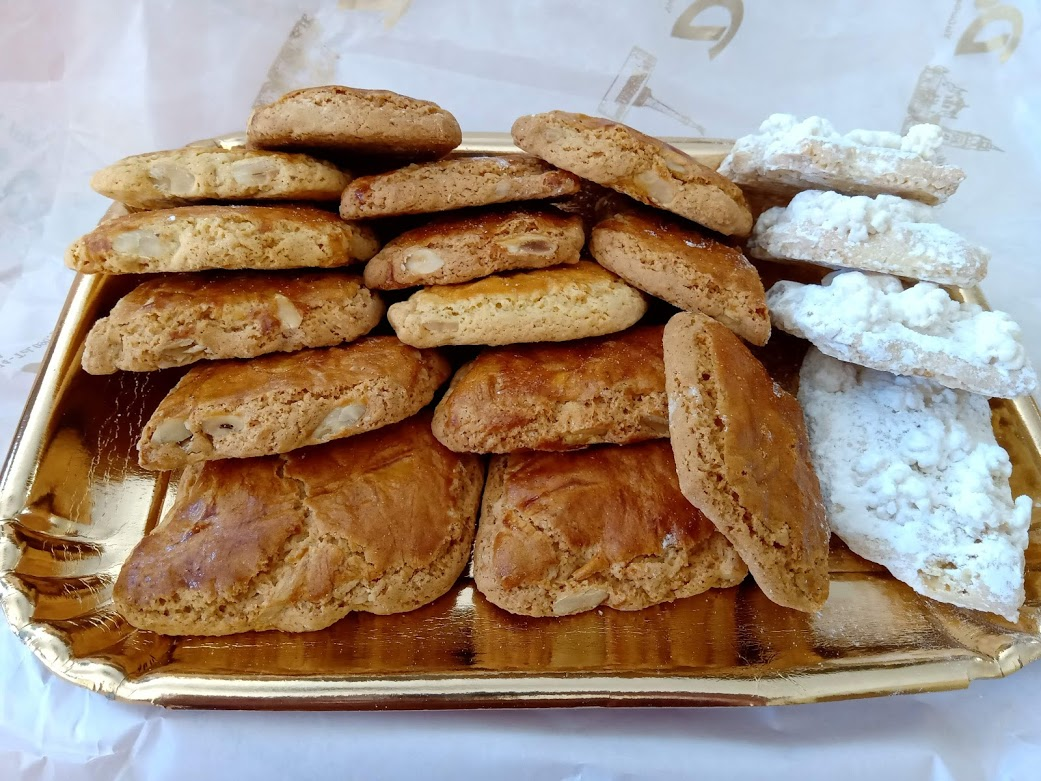
'Nzuddi

'Nzuddi are traditional cookies typical of the Italian provinces of Messina and Catania. They are spherical, slightly flattened, golden-colored cookies, made of flour, sugar, almonds, cinnamon, egg whites, and vanilla.

Historically, the cookies were made for the feast of Our Lady of the Letter, Saint Patron of the city of Messina, on June 3. These cakes were originally prepared in the monastery of the Vincentian Sisters, and the name 'nzuddi derives from the abbreviation of the name "Vincenzo" in the Sicilian language.

== See also ==
- Sicilian cuisine
- List of Italian desserts and pastries
