= Cipolla di Giarratana =

Variety of flowering plants

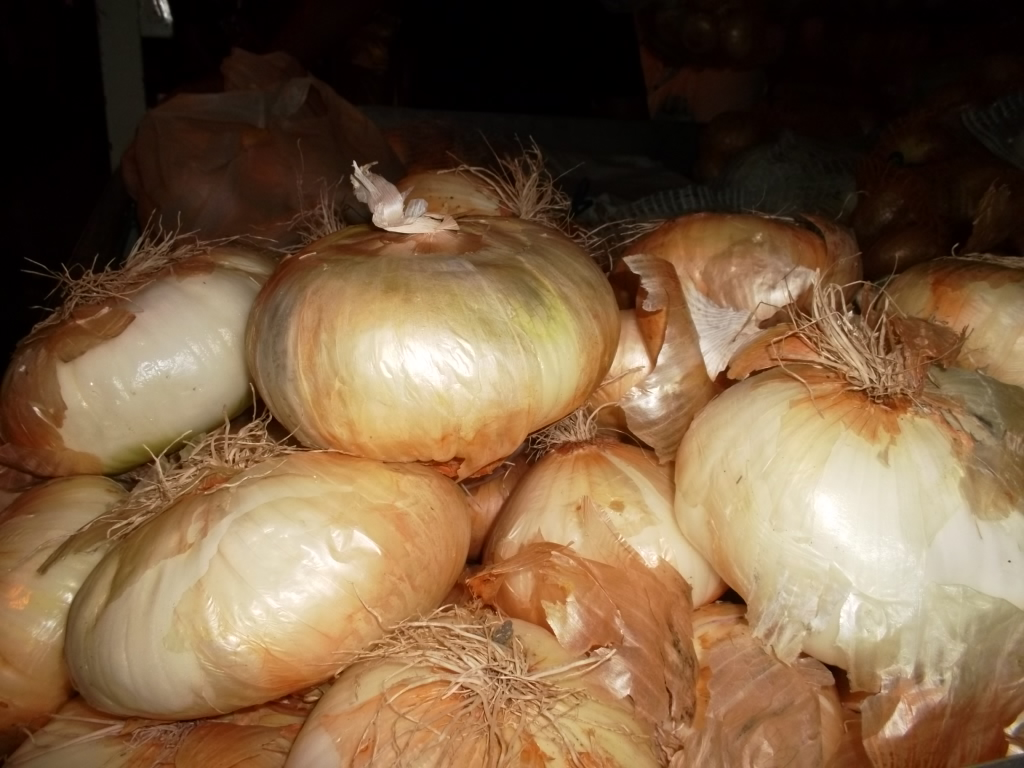
- Cipolla di Giarratana (Giarratana Onion)
- Species: Allium cepa
- Cultivar: Cipolla di Giarratana
- Origin: Sicilian

The Cipolla di Giarratana (Giarratana Onion) is a Sicilian variety of onion, sweet and of considerable size, with bulbs from the flattened shape which can be up to 3.5 kilograms in weight and a white-brownish tunic. It is cultivated in the comune of Giarratana, in the Hyblaean Mountains, where it is the main product of the local agriculture. A Festival, the "Sagra della cipolla", is held every August in the town.

It is listed as a traditional Italian food product (P.A.T.) by the Ministry of Agricultural, Food and Forestry Policies.
