= Pasta con le sarde =

Sicilian dish of pasta and sardines

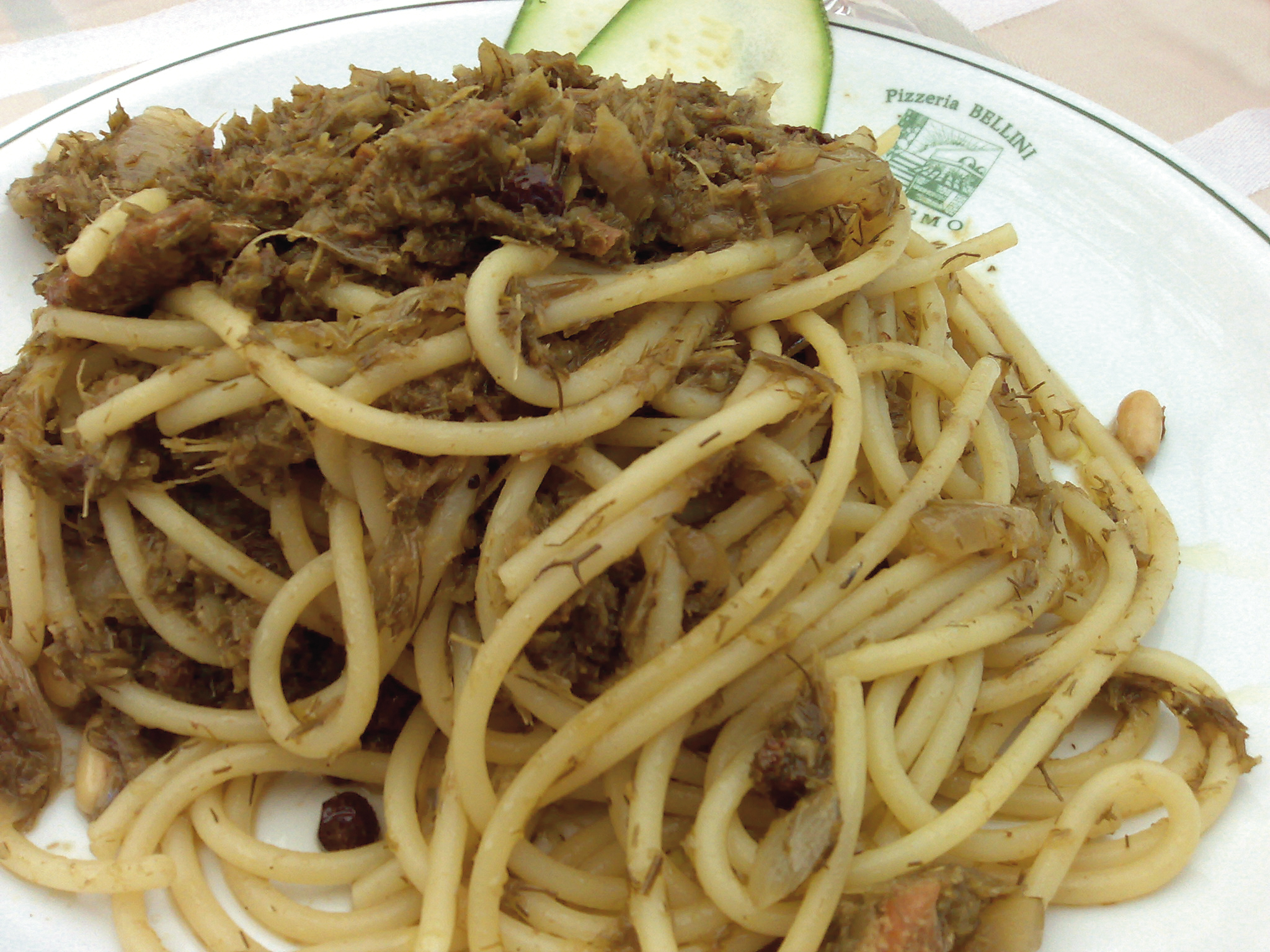
- Pasta con le sarde prepared in Palermo, Italy
- Course: Primo (Italian course)
- Place of origin: Italy
- Region or state: Sicily
- Main ingredients: Sardines, anchovy, wild fennel, saffron, pine nuts, raisins, breadcrumbs

Pasta con le sarde (Italian: [ˈpasta kon le ˈsarde]; Sicilian: pasta chî sardi) is a Sicilian pasta dish with sardines and anchovies. It is recognized as a traditional Italian food product in the prodotto agroalimentare tradizionale (PAT) scheme of the Italian government. It is most associated with the city of Palermo, but it can be found all over the island.

== Ingredients ==
The principal ingredients are olive oil, onions, pasta, and a finely chopped mixture of sardines and anchovies. Various types of pasta are used for the dish, but bucatini is traditional. Wild fennel, saffron, pine nuts, raisins, and salt are added to flavor the dish. To finish the dish it is topped with toasted breadcrumbs. Fresh sardines are preferable, but if these are not available canned sardines can be used. Wild fennel is plentiful in Sicily, but might be hard to find elsewhere; if unobtainable, the tops of ordinary fennel may be used instead.

Some variations use tomato sauce. Cookbook author Pino Correnti argues that the tomato-less recipe published in 1886 by the folklorist Giuseppe Pitrè is the only authentic version.

== In popular culture ==
In a 2012 interview with CNN's Piers Morgan, Supreme Court of the United States Associate Justice Antonin Scalia stated that pasta con le sarde was his favorite pasta dish. Former Brooklyn Democratic Party Chairman Frank Seddio also served the dish at an "epic" annual St. Joseph's Day party throughout his tenure.

== See also ==
- Sicilian cuisine
- List of pasta
- List of pasta dishes
