= Cuccìa =

Sicilian dish

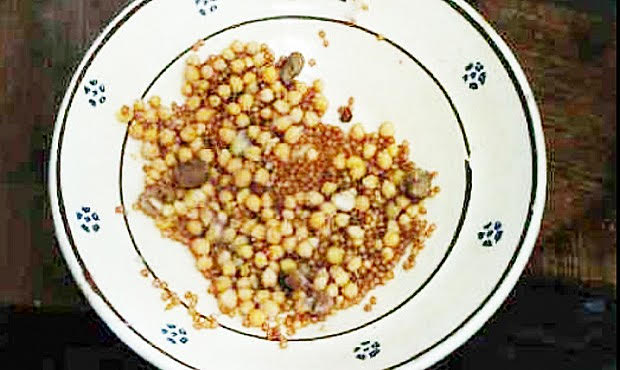
- Cuccìa di Castelmezzano, province of Potenza, Basilicata
- Type: Porridge
- Place of origin: Italy
- Region or state: Sicily
- Associated cuisine: Italian (Sicilian)
- Main ingredients: Wheat, sugar, butter, chocolate, milk

Cuccìa (Sicilian pronunciation: [kʊtˈtʃiːa]) is a primarily Sicilian dish containing boiled wheatberries and sugar, which is eaten on December 13, the feast day of Saint Lucy, the patron saint of Syracuse. The dish is consumed in Sicily and in isolated pockets of southern Italy, as well as their communities abroad. It commemorates the relief from a food shortage in Sicily and the unexpected arrival of a cargo of wheat, which tradition says arrived in the port of Palermo on Saint Lucy's Feast in 1646. According to custom, bread should not be eaten on December 13; cuccìa should be the only source of wheat, and the primary source of nourishment for the day.

== Preparation and influences ==
Cuccìa is prepared differently from family to family and in different regions. Some make cuccìa as soup, others as a pudding. In Kansas City, Missouri, many Sicilian Americans prepare cuccìa as a hot cereal. Most traditional preparations add sugar, butter, chocolate, and milk. Ceci beans (chickpeas) are also associated with the preparation of cuccìa, but more rarely, as are broad beans, almonds and ricotta. Within the Italian context, the term cuccìa is uniquely Sicilian and unrelated to similarly spelled Italian words, hinting at foreign origins.

Cuccìa may owe its origins to Sicily's Byzantine period (535–965 AD) since a variant, koliva (κόλυβα in Byzantine Greek), is prepared in the Balkans. The most probable relative may be its most similar counterpart, kutia, a dish served throughout Belarus, Ukraine, and Russia and made from wheat or barley, honey and poppyseed. As in Sicily, this dish is eaten only during the Christmas season, and its basic preparation (boiled wheat and honey instead of sugar) remains strikingly similar.

== See also ==
- Sicilian cuisine
- List of Italian desserts and pastries
- List of porridges
