= Pasta alla Norma =

Italian pasta and eggplant dish

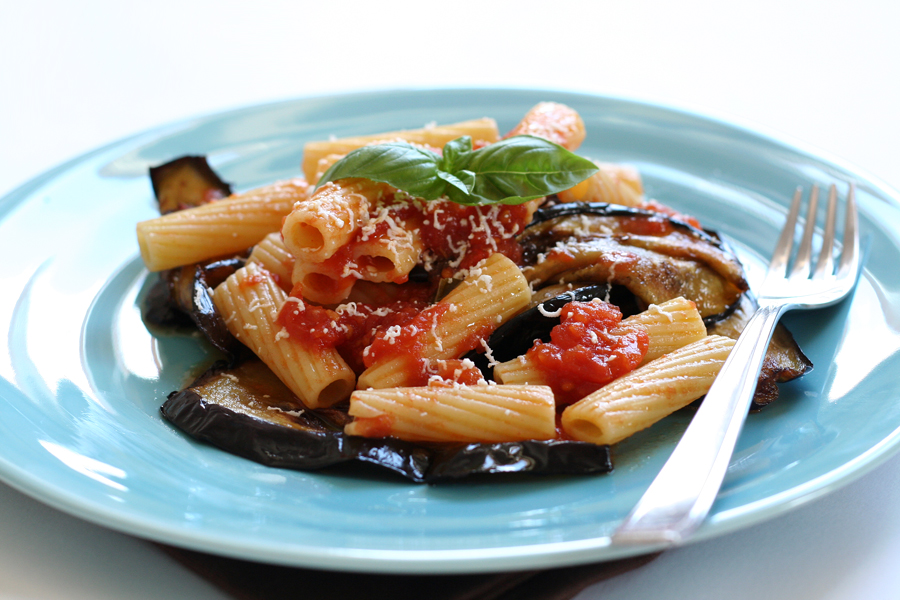
- Alternative names: Pasta con le melanzane
- Course: Primo (Italian course)
- Place of origin: Italy
- Region or state: Sicily
- Main ingredients: Pasta, tomato sauce, eggplant, ricotta salata, olive oil, garlic, basil

Pasta alla Norma (Italian: [ˈpasta alla ˈnɔrma]), also called pasta con le melanzane (lit. 'pasta with eggplant'), is a pasta dish made from eggplant. It is typical of Sicilian cuisine, from Catania in particular. In the Sicilian language, it is known as a pasta cu sucu di mulinciani, pasta ca sassa e mulinciani and pasta câ Norma. It is made of penne or other pasta with tomato sauce, covered with slices of fried eggplant and served with grated ricotta salata cheese and often basil.

It was named in honor of a native of Catania, Vincenzo Bellini, the composer of the opera Norma. It is said that the Italian writer Nino Martoglio exclaimed "This is a real 'Norma'!", meaning a masterpiece, when he tasted the dish, although the name is not attested until decades after his death.

Pasta alla Norma was named "dish of the year" by the BIT Tourism Award in 2018.

== See also ==
Media related to Pasta alla Norma at Wikimedia Commons

- Sicilian cuisine
- List of pasta
- List of pasta dishes
- List of eggplant dishes
