= Sicilian cuisine =

Style of cooking on the island of Sicily

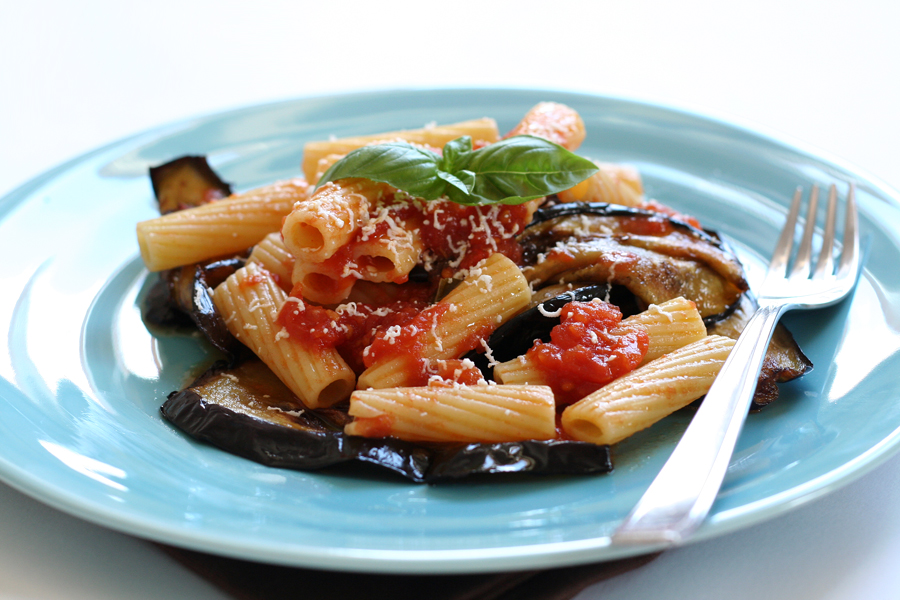
The Catanese dish pasta alla Norma is among Sicily's most historic and iconic.

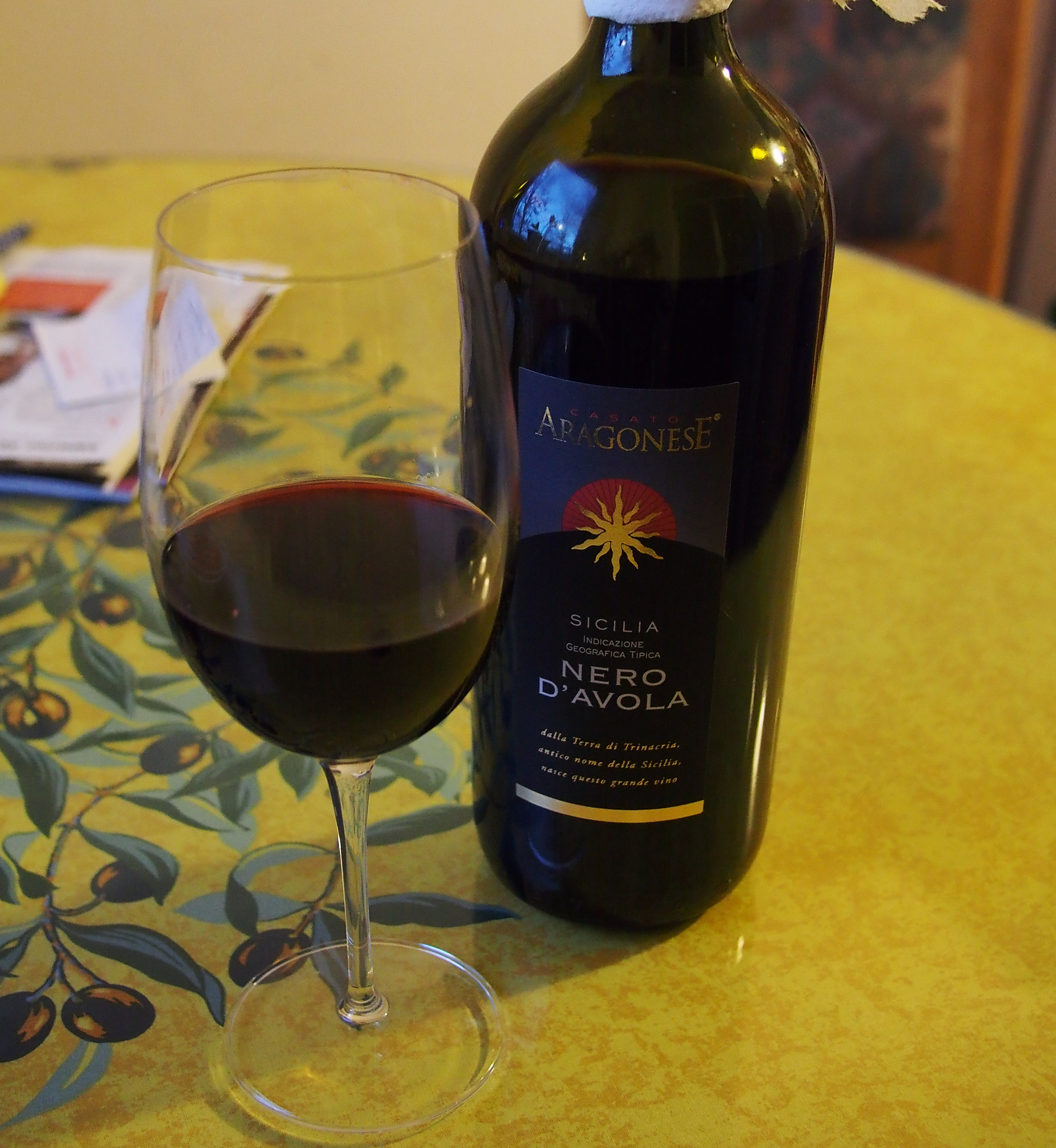
Nero d'Avola wine

Sicilian cuisine is the style of cooking on the island of Sicily. It shows traces of all cultures that have existed on the island of Sicily over the last two millennia. Although its cuisine has much in common with Italian cuisine, Sicilian food also has Greek, Spanish, Jewish, Tunisian, and Arab influences.

The Sicilian cook Mithaecus, born during 5th century BC, is credited with having brought knowledge of Sicilian gastronomy to Greece: his cookbook was the first in Greek, therefore he was the earliest cookbook author in any language whose name is known.

== Overview ==
Sicily shows traces of all the cultures which established themselves on the island over the last two millennia. Although its cuisine undoubtedly has a predominantly Italian base, Sicilian food also has Spanish, Greek, and Arab influences.

The ancient Romans introduced lavish dishes based on goose. The Byzantines favoured sweet and sour flavours and the Arabs brought sugar, citrus, rice, spinach, and saffron. The Normans and Hohenstaufens had a fondness for meat dishes. The Spanish introduced items from the New World including chocolate, maize, turkey, and tomatoes.

Much of the island's cuisine encourages the use of fresh vegetables such as aubergine, peppers, and tomatoes, as well as fish such as tuna, seabream, sea bass, swordfish, and cuttlefish. In Trapani, in the extreme western corner of the island, Tunisian influences are clear in the use of various couscous based dishes, usually combined with fish. Mint is used extensively in cooking unlike the rest of Italy.

Traditional specialties from Sicily include arancini (a form of deep-fried rice croquettes), pasta alla Norma, caponata, pani câ meusa, and a host of desserts and sweets such as cannoli, granita, and cassata.

Typical of Sicily is Marsala, a red, fortified wine similar to Port and largely exported.

== History ==
Much of the island was initially settled by Greek colonists, who left a preference for fish, wheat, olives, grapes, broad beans, chickpeas, lentils, almonds, pistachios, and fresh vegetables. Arab influences on Sicilian cuisine trace to the Arab domination of Sicily in the 10th and early 11th centuries, and include the use of sugar, citrus, rice, raisins, pine nuts and spices such as saffron, nutmeg, and cinnamon. Norman influences are also found, such as in the fondness for meat dishes. The Jewish community, who lived in the island, also left their mark on the Sicilian cuisine, they were responsible for introducing garlic fried in olive oil into the sauce. Later, the Spanish introduced numerous items from the New World, including cocoa, maize, peppers, zucchini, potatoes, and tomatoes, along with other produce. Much of the island's cuisine encourages the use of fresh vegetables such as eggplant, artichoke, and tomatoes, and fish such as tuna, sea bream, sea bass, cuttlefish, and swordfish. In Trapani in the extreme western corner of the island, North African influences are clear in the use of couscous.

== Dishes ==
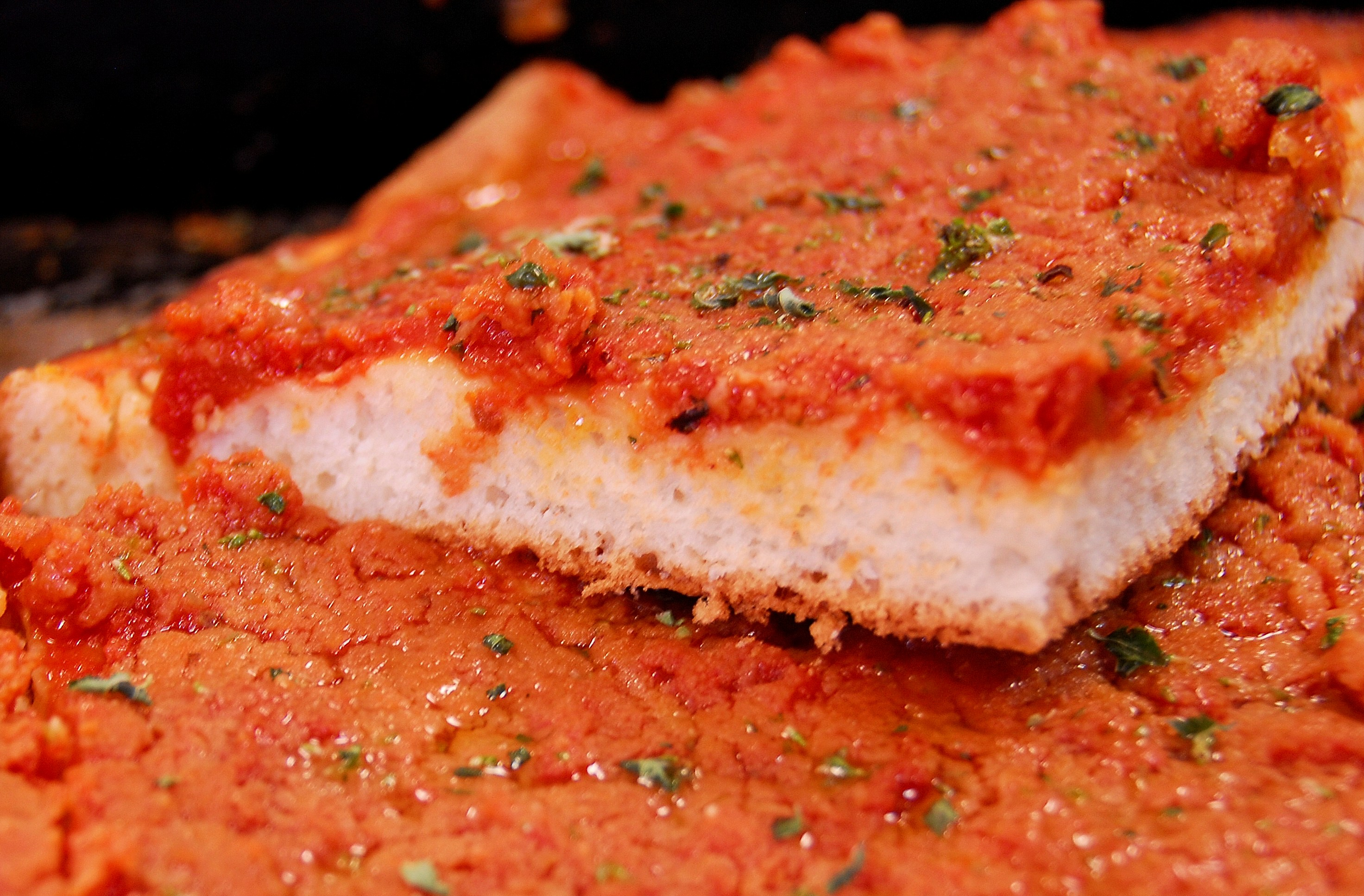
Sicilian pizza

=== Starters ===
The starters (called antipasti) are an important aspect of Sicilian cuisine. Common Sicilian starters include caponata and gatò di patate (a kind of potato and cheese pie).

=== Soups ===
Maccu is a Sicilian soup and foodstuff prepared with fava beans as a primary ingredient. It is a peasant food and staple that dates back to ancient history. Maccu di San Giuseppe (lit. 'maccu of St. Joseph') is a traditional Sicilian dish that consists of various ingredients and maccu. The dish may be prepared on Saint Joseph's Day in Sicily, to clear out pantries and allow room for the spring's new crops of vegetables.

=== Pasta ===
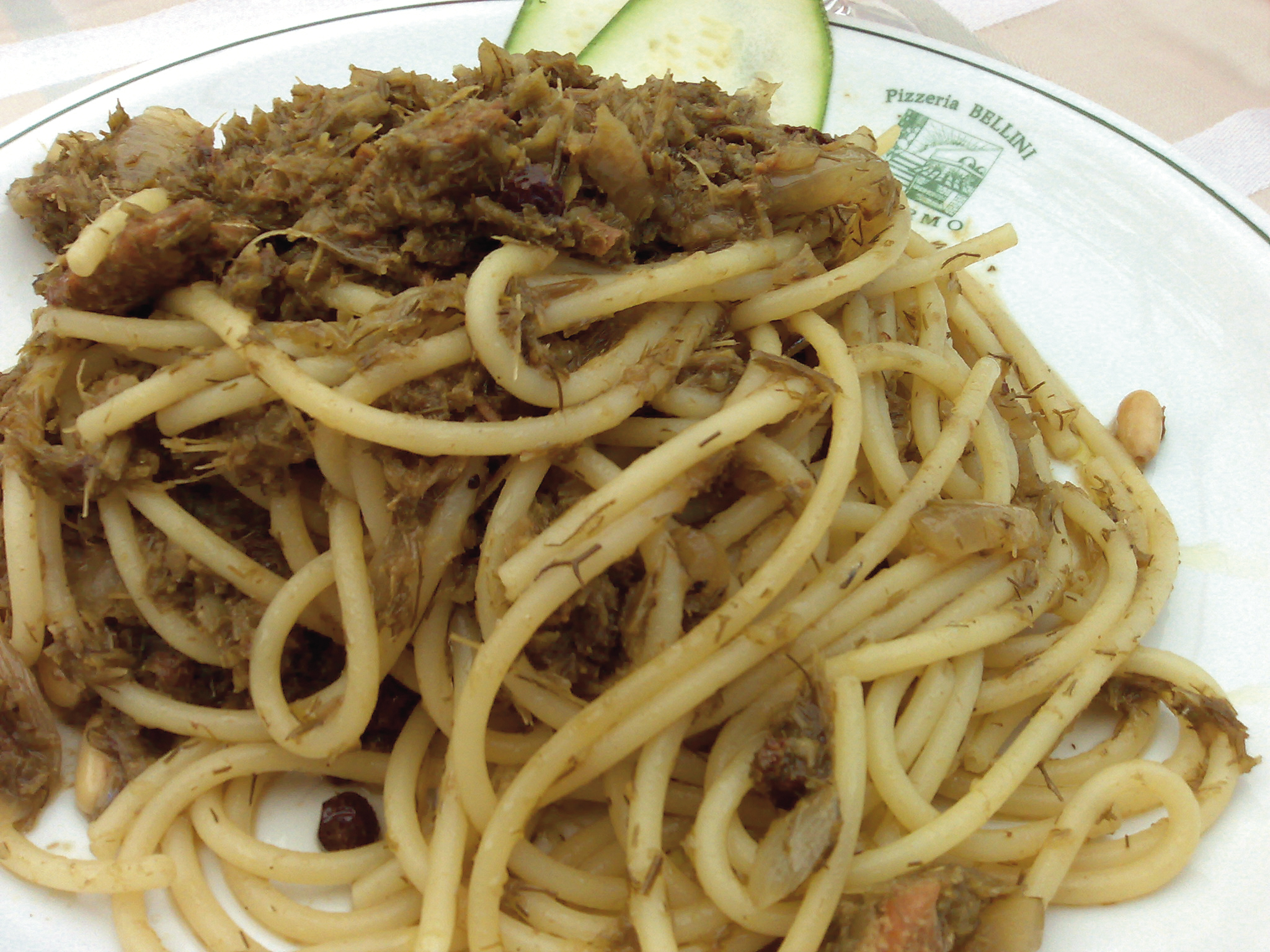
Pasta con le sarde (with sardines)

Sicily is the oldest Italian and Western location on record where pasta worked into long and thin form was part of the local cuisine. This dates back to around the 12th century, as attested by the Tabula Rogeriana of Muhammad al-Idrisi, reporting some traditions about the Kingdom of Sicily.

Spaghetti ai ricci di mare (spaghetti prepared with sea urchin), pasta con le sarde (with sardines) and pasta alla Norma (with eggplant and a specialty that originated in Catania) are the most popular pasta dishes that are typically Sicilian. Cannelloni is another common dish. Another popular dish in eastern Sicily is pasta with capuliato.

=== Main dish ===
After the pasta, the typical Sicilian menu includes a second or main dish (secondi) based on meat or fish. Main dishes based on seafood are couscous al pesce and pesce spada alla ghiotta (swordfish).

=== Desserts and sweets ===
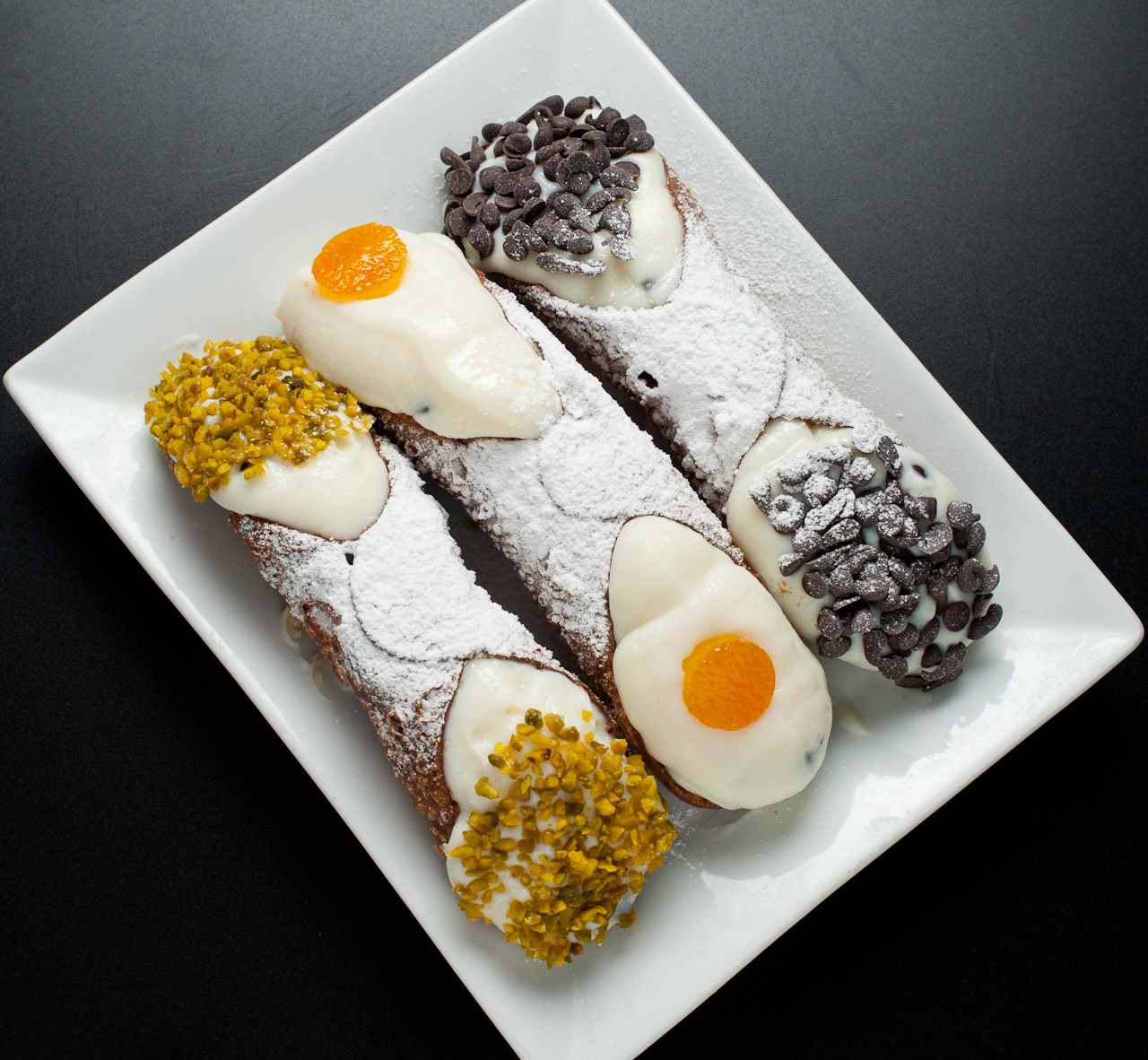
Cannoli with pistachio, candied fruit, and chocolate chips

Traditional sugar statues, called pupa di cena, are still made, although now featuring modern celebrities or culture figures. Sweets are another specialty. Examples include frutta martorana, pignolata, buccellato, cannoli, granita, cassata, and crocetta di Caltanissetta, a sweet that disappeared and was rediscovered in 2014.

Candy in Sicily was heavily influenced by the Arab candymakers in the 9th century, and Sicilian candy has preserved more of that influence than almost any other place in Europe. Marzipan fruits may have been invented at the Convent of Eloise at Martorana in the 14th century. In the 17th and 18th centuries, many Sicilian monasteries produced candies and pastries, some with fertility themes. The only surviving convent to follow this tradition is the Monastery of the Virgins of Palermo, which makes breast-shaped cakes in honor of Saint Agatha of Sicily.

Granita is particularly famous and well known. It is a semi-frozen dessert of sugar, water, and flavourings originally from the island, and is commonly associated with Messina or Catania, even though there is no evident proof that it hails from any particular Sicilian city. Related to sorbet and Italian ice, in most of Sicily it has a coarser, more crystalline texture. Food writer Jeffrey Steingarten says that "the desired texture seems to vary from city to city" on the island; on the west coast and in Palermo, it is at its chunkiest, and in the east it is nearly as smooth as sorbet. This is largely the result of different freezing techniques: the smoother types are produced in a gelato machine, while the coarser varieties are frozen with only occasional agitation, then scraped or shaved to produce separated crystals.

=== Fruits ===
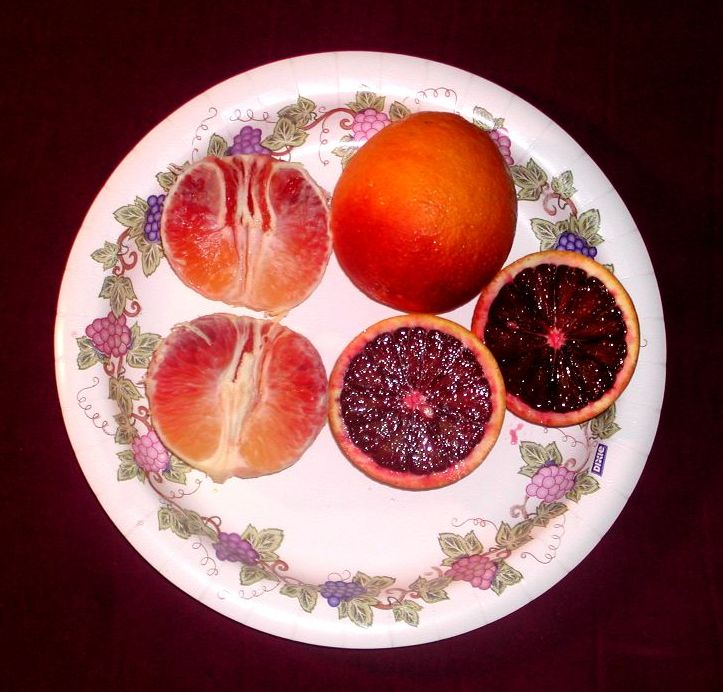
Tarocco blood oranges

Citrus fruits are a popular ingredient in Sicilian cuisine. Many were first introduced by the Arabs from the 9th to 11th centuries, but some, such as the Washington navel from Brazil, have been brought to the island more recently. Examples of citrus fruits found in Sicily are:

- Biondo comune – the "common blonde" orange
- Ovale – ripens between April and May, with a compact flesh
- Sanguigno comune – common blood orange harvested between January and April
- Washington navel – introduced from Brazil during the 1940s–1950s, grown chiefly near Ribera and Sciacca and harvested from November to January
- Sanguinella – bitter orange of the blood orange variety, found in Paternò Santa Maria di Licodia, Palagonia, Scordia and Francofonte during January until April
- Tarocco – high quality blood orange found in Catania, Siracusa and Francofonte from November to January
- Tarocco dal muso - bell shaped orange found in Francofonte
- Valencia – similar to the Ovale and used often in confectionery items
- Moro – crimson colored flesh found in Lentini, Scordia, and Francofonte from mid-January until the end of April
- Comune – common variety of the mandarin orange
- Mandarino tardivo di Ciaculli – a second variety of the mandarin orange found in Sicily
- Femminello, Siracusa lemon – the lemon that makes up 80% of Sicily's lemon crop, found in Catania, Syracuse, Messina and Palermo
- Monachello – "little monk" lemon harvested from October to March and able to withstand drought better that the Femminello
- Verdello – a lime that grows particularly well and is harvested from May to September

=== Cheese ===
Red pecorino, also known as pecorino Rosso, is a Sicilian variety where the cheese is coated repeatedly with olive oil and tomato sauce, giving it its red colour and creating a protective layer on the rind as the cheese matures. It is included in the list of food products of traditional Italian cuisine (A.P.T), the Ministry of Agriculture, Food and Forestry.

=== Wines and drinks ===
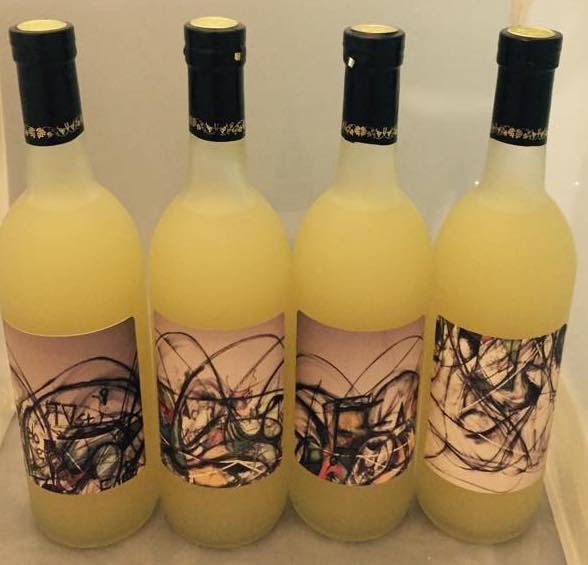
Bottles of limoncello, a popular and strong lemon liqueur

The drink most often served with the main meal in Sicily is wine. The soil and climate in Sicily are ideal for growing grapes, mainly due to Mount Etna, and a wine-making tradition on the island has existed since at least 4000 BC. Today, all Sicilian provinces produce wine and Sicilian wine produced by modern methods has established itself on the European wine market.

Sicilian red wines have an alcoholic content of 12.5 to 13.5% and are usually drunk in the evening with roast or grilled meat. Well-known red wines include the Cerasuolo di Vittoria and the Nero d'Avola, mainly those produced around Noto (Siracusa). The dry and white wines and rosés usually have an alcoholic content from 11.5 to 12.5% and are mainly consumed with fish, poultry and pasta dishes. Sicily is also known for producing dessert wines, such as Marsala and the Malvasia delle Lipari.

Other common Sicilian alcoholic drinks include limoncello, a lemon liqueur, and Amaro Averna, a herbal drink, which is often consumed after meals as a digestive.

=== Street food ===
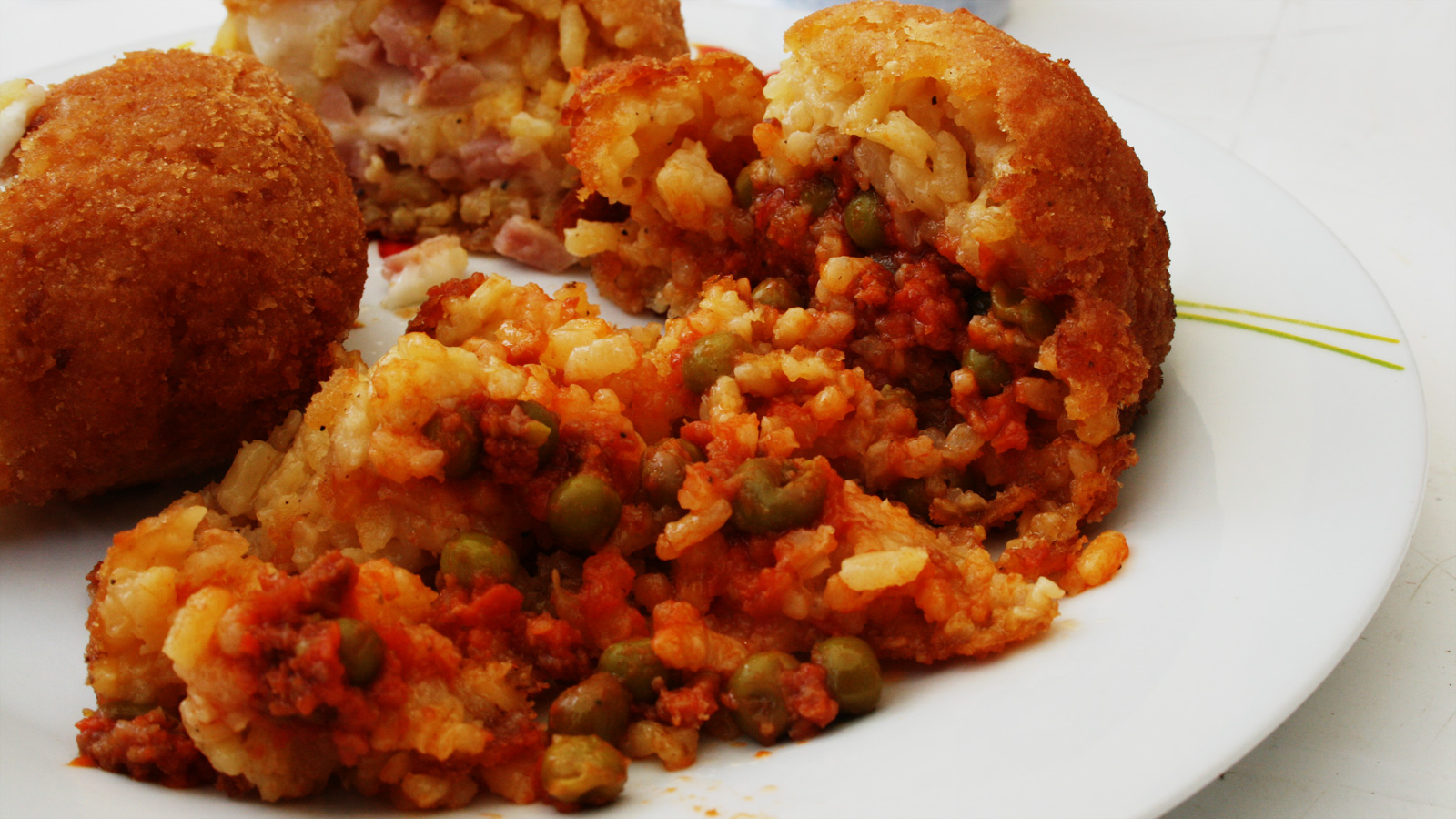
Arancini from Ragusa, Sicily. Arancini are fried or (less often) baked rice balls usually filled with ragù (meat sauce), tomato sauce, mozzarella or peas, and then coated in bread crumbs.

Sicilians eat large quantities of street food, including the renowned arancini (a form of deep-fried rice croquettes). Popular street foods include pani câ meusa, pane e panelle, and stigghiola in the Palermo region, cartocciate and cipolline in the Catania region, and focaccia messinese and pidone messinese (or pitone or pidune, in dialect) in the Messina area.

Arancini, also known as arancine, are Italian rice balls that are stuffed, coated with breadcrumbs and deep-fried. They are a staple of Sicilian cuisine. The most common arancini fillings are al ragù or al sugo, filled with ragù (meat or mince, slow-cooked at low temperature with tomato sauce and spices), mozzarella or caciocavallo cheese, and often peas, and al burro or ô burru, filled with prosciutto and mozzarella or béchamel sauce. A number of regional variants exist which differ in their fillings and shape. Arancini al ragù produced in eastern Sicily, particularly in cities such as Catania and Messina, have a conical shape inspired by the volcano Etna.

== See also ==
- Italian cuisine
- Cuisine of Abruzzo
- Apulian cuisine
- Emilian cuisine
- Cuisine of Liguria
- Lombard cuisine
- Cuisine of Mantua
- Cuisine of Basilicata
- Neapolitan cuisine
- Piedmontese cuisine
- Roman cuisine
- Cuisine of Sardinia
- Tuscan cuisine
- Venetian cuisine
- List of Sicilian dishes
- Sicilian pizza
