= Siracusa lemon =

Hybrid lemon

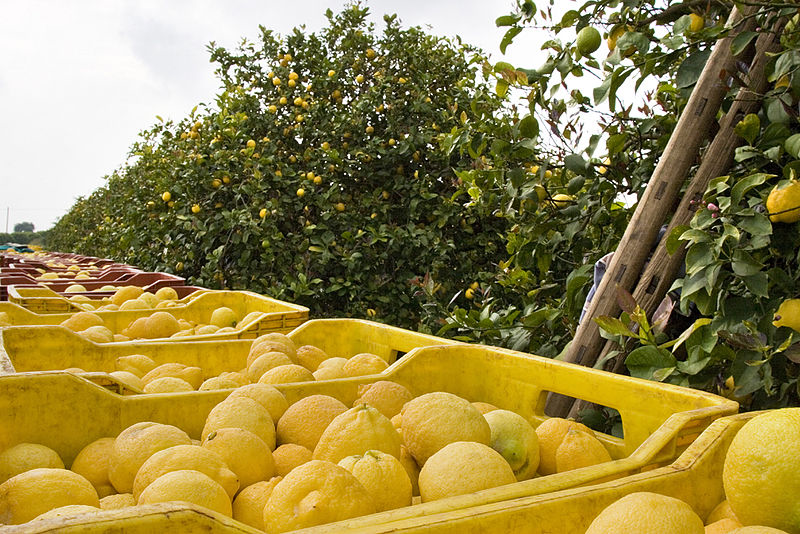
Siracusa lemons in the field

The Siracusa lemon (Italian: Limone di Siracusa IGP) is the fruit of the cultivar femminello and its clones, corresponding to the botanical species Citrus × limon L. Burm. The femminello cultivar from Siracusa is the most common variety of lemon in Italy, and produces three main flowerings: the primofiore (from October 1), the bianchetto (also less commonly known as the maiolino, from April 15) and the verdello (or summer lemon, from July 1). The disciplinary regulations of the Siracusa lemon (PGI) forbids the use of waxes and/or fungicides in post-harvesting, and therefore the fruit is edible in all its parts.

== Origins ==
The lemon plant originates in Burma, where it is found growing wild: from there it crossed the Middle East, Mesopotamia, and Syria (region), to the Mediterranean, where it found favorable conditions to thrive. The natural habitat of the lemon lies in a strip from the 40° parallel in the North to the 40° parallel in the South: this strip includes California, Uruguay, Argentina, South Africa and the Mediterranean basin, in particular Italy, Spain, Greece and Turkey. In the fifteenth and sixteenth centuries, when there was an aristocratic monopoly on citrus growing, the use of lemons was confined to luxury foods.

It began to be cultivated more intensively in Siracusa from the early seventeenth century, through the work of the Jesuits who were competent growers. The lemon went on to become one of the principal sources of wealth in the region, reaching an output of around 11,500 tonnes in 1891. This success catalysed the birth in Sicily of various citrus related industries, which extracted juice concentrates, calcium citrate and the citric acid from the fruit. During this period the Siracusa lemon made a considerable fortune in foreign markets, especially in the United States and in England, as confirmed by records from the second half of the eighteenth century, held in Siracusa's Camera di Commercio e Arti (lit. 'Chamber of Commerce and Arts'). Records regarding shipments at the Port of Siracusa in the early nineteenth century indicate that the principal destinations for lemons, oranges, both sweet and bitter, concentrated lemon juice and calcium citrate were the ports of Trieste, London, Fiume, Liverpool, Glasgow, Manchester, Malta and Odessa.

Despite the urbanisation and industrialisation (see e.g. Augusta-Priolo) that occurred at the beginning of the post-war period, lemon growing was anything but abandoned in the Siracusa area, and still today continues to be a very important economic mainstay: Siracusa is considered, in qualitative and quantitative terms, a hub for fresh lemons in both the Italian and European markets. On 3 February 2011 the name Limone di Siracusa (Siracusa lemon) was registered as having protected geographical indication (PGI) – regulation (EC) n. 96/2011.

== Fruit characteristics ==
The Siracusa lemon is characterised by a high juice content and abundance of oil glands in the skin, as well as the high quality of its essential oils. The Siracusan variety of lemon is called a femminello because of the fertility of the plant, which flowers all year round: the primofiore matures from October 1, has an elliptical shape, skin and flesh which varies from light green to lemon-yellow, and lemon-yellow juice; the bianchetto ripens from April 15, is ovoid-elliptical, with light yellow skin, yellow flesh and lemon-yellow juice; the verdello matures from July 1, is an spheroid elliptical shape, light green skin, and lemon-yellow flesh and juice.

The planting scheme must have a maximum density of 400–500 plants per hectare or 850 in the case of high-density dynamic planting. Growers can use conventional, integrated and organic methods. All cultivation operations must be undertaken in a way which maintain perfect plant equilibrium and development in addition to providing normal aeration and sunlight exposure. Harvesting is done by hand-picking each fruit direct from the plant, using special secateurs to cut the fruit's stalk.

== Production capacity ==
The Siracusa lemon accounts for more than 30% of the Italian lemon supply. The consumer base for the Siracusa lemon is mainly represented in the Italian market by large scale retail chains, in particular those from northern Italy; intra-EU exports are directed at the markets of Germany, Austria, France, and Denmark; while the principal markets outside the EU are the United Kingdom and Norway. The product is branded in the marketplace as "Limone di Siracusa IGP": it can be sold either in bulk, or packaged in appropriate containers made from cardboard, wood or plastic, or in nets and bags with a plastic band attached to the net. Retail categories are "Extra" and "Prima" only, for the fresh produce, while processing admits lower categories too.

== Product uses ==
The Siracusa lemon is used in a wide range of fields, in addition to the commercial fresh fruit market; in particular, the food and drink sectors, medical and scientific applications, cosmetics and perfumery, which are supplied with juice and essential oil through processing companies.

== Curiosity and folklore ==
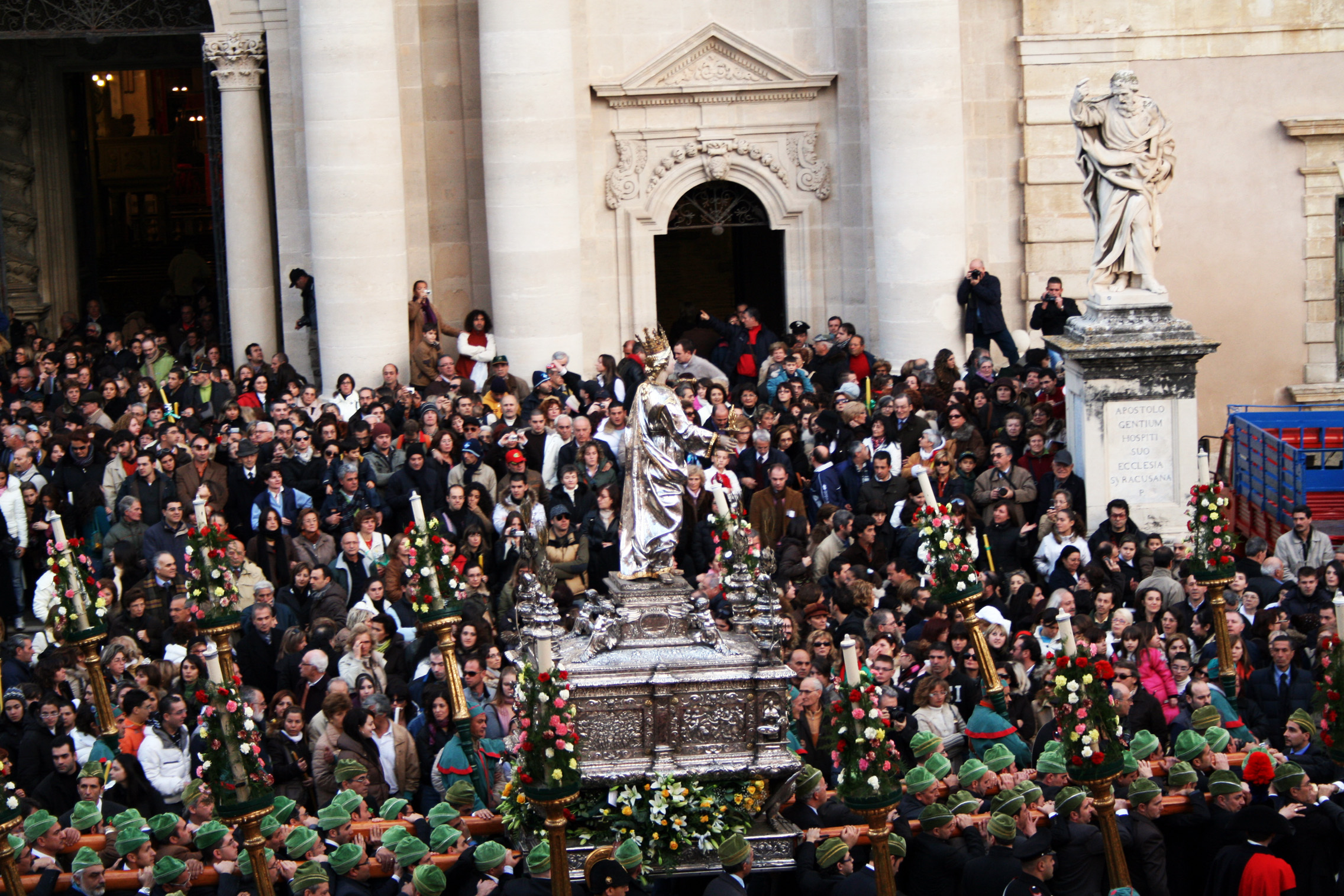
The festival of Santa Lucia patron saint of Siracusa

Every year, on December 13, the city of Siracusa celebrates the festival of its patron saint, Santa Lucia (Saint Lucy), with a long procession from the Piazza del Duomo in Ortigia to the Chiesa di Santa Lucia al Sepolcro. Eight days later, on the December 20, the procession retraces its route. On December 13, tradition dictates that the large candles which stand at the four corners of the statue of Santa Lucia are covered with bouquets of flowers, while on December 20, the silver statue is flanked by candles adorned with lemons and oranges.

== PGI-certified lemons in the European Union ==
Italy has 16,693 hectares (41,250 acres) of lemon groves. The Siracusa lemon comprises more than 30% of the entire national production, with a cultivated area of almost 6,000 hectares. The production zone stretches in a coastal strip across 10 comuni (municipalities) in the province of Siracusa, in Sicily: Augusta, Avola, Melilli, Noto and Siracusa, and also includes some inland areas, in the comuni of Floridia, Solarino, Priolo Gargallo, Rosolini and Sortino. The land area devoted to growing protected geographical indication lemons in the European Union:

PGI variety	Provenance	Land area in hectares (Ha)
Limone di Siracusa	Italy	6,000
Citricos Valencianos	Spain	3,300
Limone Interdonato di Messina	Italy	950
Limone di Sorrento	Italy	400
Limone di Amalfi	Italy	400
Limone Femminello del Gargano	Italy	400
Citrinos do Algarve	Portugal	320
Limone di Rocca Imperiale	Italy	200
Citron de Menton	France	N/A

The European Union has nine (PGI) denominations for lemons: six of these are from Italy, one from France, one from Spain, and one from Portugal. Other than the Siracusa lemon, the Italian denominations are the "Limone di Sorrento", the "Limone Costa d'Amalfi", the "Interdonato di Messina", the "Femminello del Gargano", and the "Limone di Rocca Imperiale". The French denomination is the "Citron de Menton". The Spanish denomination is the "Citricos Valencianos", while in Portugal the "Citrinos do Algarve" is protected.

== Consortium ==
The Consorzio di Tutela del Limone di Siracusa IGP (Consortium for the Protection of the Siracusa Lemon PGI) was founded on 13 July 2000. It does not undertake commercial activities or sell lemons itself, though its members do. The Consortium's responsibilities include:

- defining the zones of production and varieties covered by PGI status;
- monitoring the zone of origin and markets to ensure correct usage of the "Siracusa lemon PGI" denomination;
- promoting and spreading awareness and images of the PGI product at home and abroad.

The current (2018) President of the Consortium is Michele Salvatore Lonzi.
