= Caciocavallo =

Italian cheese

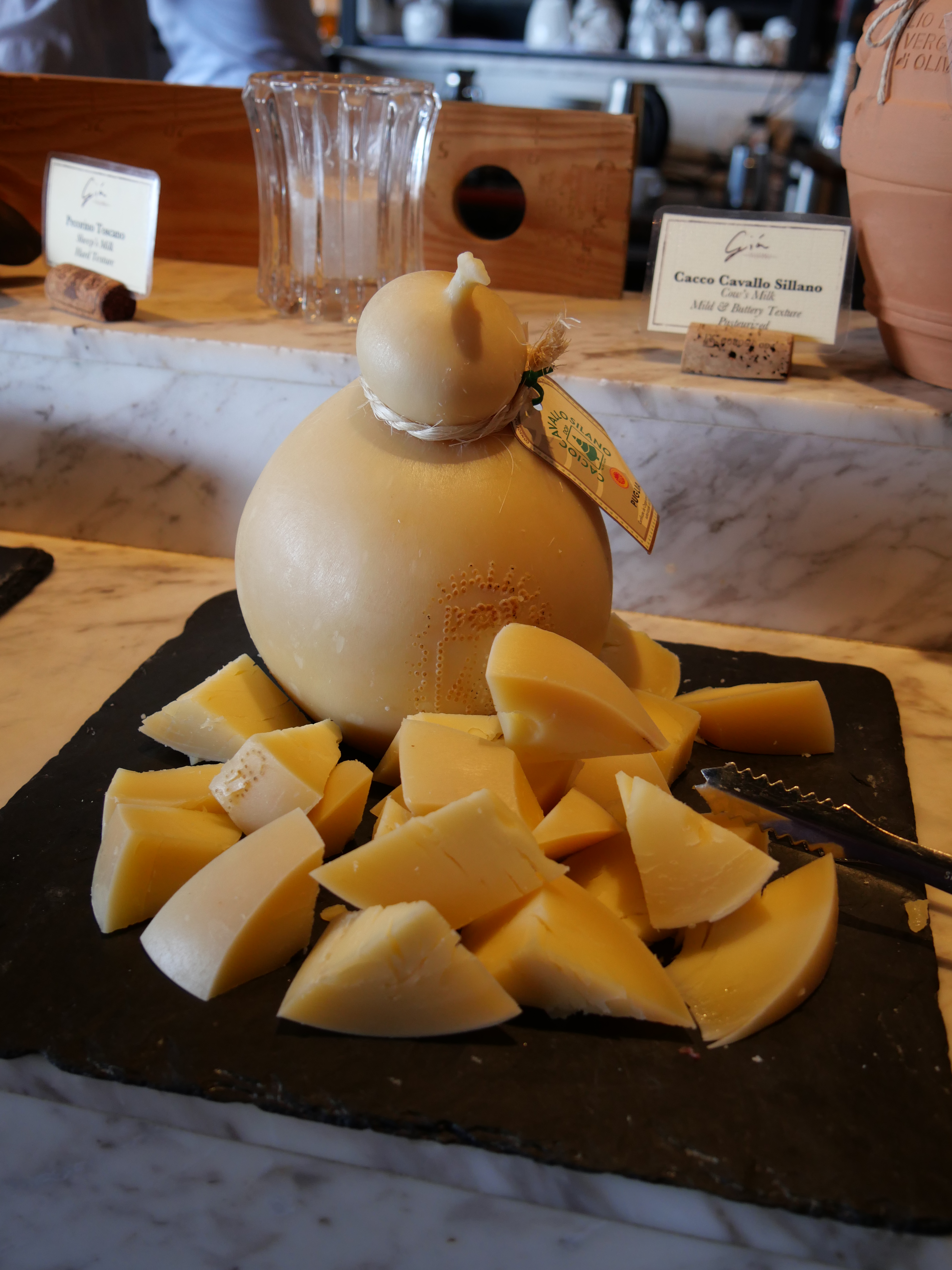
- Whole cheese and cut into pieces
- Country of origin: Italy
- Source of milk: Sheep, cow
- Certification: PDO (caciocavallo silano)

Caciocavallo (Italian: [ˌkatʃokaˈvallo]) is a type of pasta filata ('stretched-curd') cheese made out of sheep's or cow's milk. It is produced throughout southern Italy, particularly in the Apennine Mountains and in the Gargano peninsula. Shaped like a teardrop, it is similar in taste to the aged southern Italian provolone cheese, with a hard edible rind.

== Etymology ==
The Italian name of the cheese caciocavallo literally means 'horse cheese' and it is generally thought that the name derives from the fact that two cheese forms are always bound together with rope and then left to mature by placing them a cavallo, i.e. straddling, upon a horizontal stick or branch.

== History ==
A sort of caciocavallo is believed to have first been mentioned by Hippocrates (c. 460–c. 370 BC), who emphasised the "Greeks' cleverness in making cheese". Columella in his classic treatise on agriculture, De re rustica (35–45 CE), described precisely the methods used in its preparation, making it one of the oldest known cheeses in the world. Types of cheese with names similar to caciocavallo are common throughout the Balkans and southern Italy. In Sicily, the Ragusano DOP, known locally as caciocavallo ragusano had to drop the denomination "caciocavallo" in order to get DOP status.

== Types ==
Many different types of caciocavallo exist in Italy, and several are recognised as prodotti agroalimentari tradizionali (PAT), such as caciocavallo podolico (produced using only milk from the Podolica cattle breed), caciocavallo di Castelfranco (from Miscano Valley in the Apennines) or caciocavallo di Godrano (often called caciocavallo palermitano).

== Protected geographical status (PDO) ==
Caciocavallo silano is made with cow's milk in designated areas of southern Italy, in the regions of Basilicata, Calabria, Campania, Molise and Apulia, and gained protected geographical status in 1993.

== In other languages ==
Albanian: kaçkavall ;
Bosnian: kačkavalj ;
Bulgarian: кашкавал, kashkaval ;
Romanian: cașcaval ;
Serbian: качкаваљ/kačkavalj ;
Macedonian: кашкавал ;
Sicilian: caciucavaddu ;
Sardinian: casizolu, taedda, peretta, tittighedda ;
Turkish: kaşkaval /kaşar ;
Hebrew: קשקבל, kashkaval ;
Greek: κασκαβάλι, kaskavali , κασέρι, kaseri ;
Arabic: قشقوان, kashkawane.

Although the names are similar, each of these local speciality cheeses is different from both caciocavallo silano and each other.

== See also ==
Media related to Caciocavallo at Wikimedia Commons

- List of Italian cheeses
- List of stretch-curd cheeses
- Kashkaval
