= Prodotto agroalimentare tradizionale =

Italian food approval process

PAT seal

Prodotto agroalimentare tradizionale (PAT) is an official approval for traditional Italian regional food products similar to the protected geographical status of the European Union. A list of approved products is published by the Ministry of Agricultural, Food and Forestry Policies. The denomination is attributed by each regional government, in collaboration with the Ministry of Agricultural, Food and Forestry Policies.

In 2025 a total of 5,717 products carried PAT certification; the region with the largest number of approved products was Campania, with 610.

== Classification ==
PAT products are classified into ten categories: drinks; meats; condiments; cheeses; oils and fats; vegetables and vegetable products; pasta, bread and patisserie; delicatessen; fish and seafood; and products of animal origin other than those above.

== See also ==
- List of Italian food and drink products with protected status
- Denominazione di origine controllata
- Denominazione comunale d'origine
