= List of Italian desserts and pastries =

Name, image, and description for each, with pastries in a 2nd section

This is a list of Italian desserts and pastries. Italian cuisine has developed through centuries of social and political changes, with roots as far back as the 4th century BCE. Italian desserts have been heavily influenced by cuisine from surrounding countries and those that have invaded Italy, such as Greece, Spain, Austria, and France. Italian cuisine is also influenced by the Mediterranean climate and agriculture.

== Characteristics ==
Italy has an extremely diverse range of cuisines, due to the many culinary influences throughout its history. Peaches, lemons, and pears are popular fruits for recipes, as well as sweet cheeses, such as ricotta and mascarpone. Coffee, especially espresso, is integral to Italian culture and cuisine, and is featured frequently in dessert recipes, such as tiramisù. Cold dairy desserts, such as ice cream and gelato, were introduced to the Western world through Italy.

== List ==
=== A ===
Name	Image	Description
Abbamele		Sardinian honey-based product
Affogato		Espresso served with a scoop of gelato
Africanetti		Emilian sweet made with egg yolks, sugar and butter
Africani		Biscuits made with egg yolks and sugar, originally from Galatina, Apulia
Agnello pasquale		Lamb-shaped Easter sweet made of almond and pistachio paste, originally from Favara, Sicily
Amaretti		Biscuits made with almonds, egg whites and sugar
Amaretti di Saronno		Biscuits from Saronno, Lombardy, made with apricot kernels, almonds, egg whites and sugar
Amor		Tuscan and Emilian wafers filled with cream
Amor polenta		Lombard maize-flour cake
Angel wings		Fried dough shaped into ribbons and coated in powdered sugar
Anello di Monaco		Mantuan ring-shaped cake of Swiss origins
Anello di san Luigi Gonzaga		Lombard almond cake
Arancini		Carnival sweets from Marche
Aranzada		Orange zest candied in honey and almonds, originally from Sardinia
Assabesi		

=== B ===
Name	Image	Description
Babà		Neapolitan sponge cake soaked in liquor
Baci di Cherasco		Chocolate-covered hazelnuts from Cherasco, Piedmont
Baci di Cremona		Lombard hazelnut sandwich cookies
Baci di dama		Sandwich cookie made with hazelnuts and chocolate, originally from Tortona, Piedmont
Baicoli		Venetian biscuits made with butter, sugar, eggs, flour and yeast
Barbajada		Milanese drink made from whipped chocolate, milk, and coffee
Baxin		Ligurian sweet made with anise seeds and flour
Befanini		Tuscan Epiphany biscuits
Bensone		Emilian oval-shaped cake
Berlingozzo		Tuscan ring-shaped cake
Biancomangiare		Sicilian and Sardinian almond spoon sweet
Bicciolano		Biscuits from Vercelli, Piedmont, made with flour, butter, eggs and spices
Bignolata mantovana		Mantuan cake made up of beignets filled with zabajone, chocolate and whipped cream
Bisciola		Lombard sweet bread made with buckwheat flour, figs, honey, raisins and walnuts
Biscione reggiano		Snake-shaped Christmas cake from Reggio Emilia
Biscotti bolliti		Boiled and oven-baked biscuits, originally from Ragusa, Sicily
Biscotti catalani		Sicilian sugar-coated biscuits prepared for the Day of the Dead
Biscotti del Lagaccio		Genoese biscuits made with flour, butter, sugar and aniseed
Biscotto di Ceglie		Almond paste with cherry jam, originally from Ceglie Messapica, Apulia
Biscotto di mezz'agosto		Tuscan cake flavoured with wine and aniseed
Biscotti di San Martino		Sicilian thrice-cooked biscuits flavoured with aniseed
Biscotti regina		Sicilian biscuits coated with sesame seeds
Biscottini di Prosto		Biscuits from Piuro, Lombardy
Biscotto di Castellammare		Biscuit created in 1848 in Castellammare di Stabia, Campania
Biscotto Salute		Rusk made with butter, eggs, flour and sugar
Bocconotto		Abruzzese Christmas pastry filled with almonds and chocolate
Bombolone		Italian doughnut, filled with typically custard, chocolate, cream, or jam
Bonèt		Piedmontese custard dessert with amaretti and cocoa
Bossolà bresciano		Lombard sweet bread
Bracciatello		Romagnol sweet made with flour, eggs and sugar
Bracciatello cesenate		Soft biscuit from Cesena, Emilia-Romagna
Brasadelo		Ring-shaped cake from the province of Vicenza, Veneto
Brigidino di Lamporecchio		Aniseed biscuits from Lamporecchio, Tuscany
Brioche con gelato		Sicilian brioche filled with gelato
Brioscia		Sicilian brioche
Brutti ma buoni		Biscuit made from almonds or hazelnuts
Buccellati		Sicilian Christmas biscuits filled with honey, figs, oranges, spices, nuts and apricot jam
Buccellato		Sicilian cake
Buccellato di Lucca		Sweet bread from Lucca, Tuscany
Budino		Pudding made from milk and egg custard, typically topped with a crust or whipped-cream topping
Budino di riso		Rice-based pastry, originally from Pistoia, Tuscany
Bussilan		Emilian ring-shaped cake
Bussolano		Mantuan cake
Bustrèng		Romagnol fruit cake

=== C ===
Name	Image	Description
Caffè in forchetta		Coffee budino
Calcioni marchigiani		Easter cheese-filled sweets from Marche
Caldi dolci		Mantuan pastries made with maize flour, raisins, pine nuts, cinnamon, vino cotto, cloves, butter, sugar and lemon zest
Caldo freddo		Gelato dessert from Trapani, Sicily
Calzone di San Leonardo		Christmas almond sweet from Molfetta, Apulia
Camporelli		Ladyfinger-like biscuits made from sugar, flour, and eggs
Canestrelli		Biscuits made with semolina and confectioner's sugar
Canestrelli novesi		Piedmontese biscuits made with flour, white wine, olive oil, sugar and salt
Cannarìculi		Lucan and Calabrian fried pastries made with flour, olive oil, cooked wine and must
Cannolo siciliano		Sicilian rolled, crispy dough filled with ricotta
Cannolo		Puff pastry filled with custard or zabajone
Cantarella		Romagnol sweet flatbread
Cantucci		Almond biscuits from Prato, Tuscany
Caragnoli		Christmas fried pastries from southern Molise
Carfogn		Pastry from Veneto filled with jam or honey and grappa
Cariton		Piedmontese fox grape cake
Carsenta		Tuscan sweet flatbread made with aniseed, pine nuts and raisins
Carsenza		Christmas cake from Milan, containing apples and grapes
Cartellate		Apulian and Lucan Christmas fried sweets
Cartoccio di ricotta		Sicilian fried dough pastry filled with ricotta
Cassata		Sicilian round sponge cake made with ricotta, marzipan and candied fruit
Cassatella		Sicilian fried dumplings filled with sheep ricotta, cinnamon and chocolate chips
Cassatella di Agira		Pastry filled with almonds, cocoa, chickpea flour, sugar and lemon zest, originally from Agira, Sicily
Cassatella di sant'Agata		Small Sicilian cassata
Castagnaccio		Chestnut flour cake
Castagne del prete		Campanian oven-baked chestnuts with wine
Castagnole, favette		Carnival pastries
Caterine		Doll or hen-shaped chocolate biscuits from Ravenna, Emilia-Romagna
Cavallucci		Tuscan pastry made with anise, walnuts, candied fruits, coriander, and flour
Caviadini		Lombard biscuits
Celli ripieni		Abruzzese pastry filled with grape jam, walnuts, almonds and orange zest
Certosino di Bologna		Bolognese cake made with spices, honey, almonds, pine nuts and candied fruit
Charlotte alla milanese		Milanese cake made with stale bread, wine, apples, butter and sugar
Chiaro di luna		Cake filled with apricot jam, raisins and almonds, originally from Paullo, Lombardy
Chisulì		Lombard fried pastry
Cialda di Montecatini		Round sweet from Montecatini Terme, Tuscany
Ciambella		Ring-shaped cake made using flour, milk, sugar, and vanilla flavouring
Ciambella di San Cataldo		Biscuit from San Cataldo, Sicily
Ciambella romagnola		Romagnol cake
Ciambellette al vino		Wine-flavoured biscuits from Lazio
Ciambellino		Ring-shaped cake from Lucignano, Tuscany
Ciaramicola		Umbrian Easter cake containing Alchermes
Cicerata		Lucan Christmas sweet
Cicerchiata		Fried balls of dough covered in honey
Cioccolato di Modica		Specialty chocolate from Modica, Sicily
Colomba di Pasqua		Easter cake made with candied orange and almonds, originally from Milan, Lombardy
Confetti		Almonds covered in sugar coating, sometimes dyed
Confetti di Sulmona		Sugar-coated almonds from Sulmona, Abruzzo
Confetto riccio		Sugar-coated almond from Agnone, Molise
Coppa sabauda		Piedmontese spoon sweet made with seirass cheese, whipped cream, eggs, Marsala wine, raisins and lemon zest
Coppetta		Lombard sweet made with honey, walnuts and wafers
Cornetto		Venetian pastry descended from Austrian kipferl
Cotognata		Quince gel
Crema al mascarpone		Lombard Mascarpone-based spoon sweet
Crema bruciata		Sweet from Alghero, Sardinia
Crema carsolina		Julian millefeuille with zabajone
Crema di Caffe		Espresso frozen dessert
Crema di pistacchio		Pistachio cream or spread used for fillings, toppings, or eaten on its own.
Crema diplomatica		Custard made with cream and crème pâtissière
Crema reggina		Spoon sweet from Reggio Calabria made with zabajone, rum, cherries and cinnamon
Cremino		Piedmontese layered chocolate
Cri cri (chocolate)		Piedmontese chocolate praline
Crispelle di riso		Siciliano rice-based fried doughnuts
Croccante		Almond brittle
Crocetta di Caltanissetta		Sweet pastry from Caltanissetta, Sicily, made from almonds, sugar, sweet lemon purée, oranges or other fruit, pistachio and icing sugar
Crostata		Baked tart or pie
Crustuli		Calabrian Christmas pastry made with must, red wine, vermouth, olive oil, honey and flour
Csenta		Piedmontese cake
Cubeletto		Ligurian jam-filled pastries
Cuccìa		Sicilian sweet made with ricotta, boiled wheatberries and sugar
Cuccidati		Sicilian fig cookies
Cuddrireddra		Cinnamon-flavoured fried pastries from Delia, Sicily
Cuddura		Southern Italian Easter cake
Cudduraci		Calabrian Easter pastry
Cullurelli		Calabrian Christmas fried pastry
Cuore d'Abruzzo		Abruzzese cake made with almonds, candied fruit and chocolate
Cupeta		Dessert made from honey, dissolved sugar and diced almonds
Cutizza		Sweet from the province of Como, Lombardy
Cuzzupa		Calabrian Easter cake

=== D ===
Name	Image	Description
Delizia al limone		Sponge cake made with Limoncello and lemon cream, originally from Sorrento, Campania
Diablottino		Turinese vanilla-flavoured chocolate
Dolce di San Michele		Sweet bread from Bagnacavallo, Romagna
Dolce mattone		Buttercream-based spoon sweet from Emilia-Romagna
Dolce Pan Ducale		Semolina cake from Atri, Abruzzo
Dolce Torino		Romagnol sweet consisting in layers of savoiardi, buttercream, chocolate and Alchermes or Marsala
Dolceriso del Moro		Rice tart with rose water, pine nuts, almonds and candied fruit, originally from Vigevano, Lombardy

=== F ===
Name	Image	Description
Faldacchea		Almond and cherry sweet from Turi, Apulia
Ferratella		Anise-flavoured waffle cookies
Fiadone		Cheese-filled pastry
Fiapòn		Mantuan sweet made with polenta
Fichi impaccati		Dried figs filled with almonds and fennel seeds
Finocchini		Piedmontese biscuits made with fennel seeds, aniseed, flour, eggs and honey
Flantze		Aostan cake
Focaccia di Susa		Piedmontese sweet focaccia
Focaccia veneta		Sweet Easter bread from Veneto
Fregolotta		Cake from Treviso, Veneto
Frìtołe		Venetian fried doughnuts, eaten during Carnival
Frittelle di riso di san Giuseppe		Fried pastry made with rice, milk and sugar
Frustingo		Christmas sweet from Marche made with figs and nuts
Frutta martorana		Sicilian imitation fruits made from marzipan

=== G ===
Name	Image	Description
Gelato		Italian dessert similar to ice cream, thicker in consistency
Gelo di melone		Sicilian watermelon pudding
Genoise		Sponge cake made with melted butter whipped into the dough
Genovese		Sicilian custard-filled pastry
Gianduja		Chocolate made from hazelnut cream, originally from Piedmont
Gianduiotto		Piedmontese chocolate made from sugar, cocoa, and hazelnuts
Giurgiulena		Sicilian Christmas sweet made with almonds, sesame seeds, honey and sugar
Gòfri		Piedmontese biscuit
Graffe		Neapolitan sugar-coated fried doughnuts
Granita		Sicilian ice dessert made from sugar, water and various flavourings
Grano cotto		Apulian sweet made with cooked wheat, pomegranate, cinnamon, walnuts and cooked must
Grattachecca		Roman hand-shaved ice topped with various syrups
Grosti		Ladin fried pastry filled with jam
Gueffus		Sardinian sweets made from almond paste

=== I ===
Name	Image	Description
Iris		Fried ricotta-filled doughnut, originally from Palermo, Sicily

=== K ===
Name	Image	Description
Kiachln		Fried doughnuts from Trentino
Kirchtagskrapfen		South Tyrolean fried pastries filled with poppyseed jam or apricot jam
Krumiri		Biscuits created in Casale Monferrato, Piedmont, in 1878

=== L ===
Name	Image	Description
Lacabòn		Handcrafted candy from Alessandria, Piedmont
Ladyfinger		Long biscuit, typically used in tiramisù
Lattacciolo		Abruzzese spoon sweet made with milk, eggs and sugar
Latte brulè		Romagnol spoon sweet made with milk, eggs, sugar and vanilla
Latte di mandorla		Chilled and sweetened almond flavored drink
Latteruolo		Romagnol milk-based spoon sweet
Lingue di gatto		Cat tongue
Lonzino di fico		Sweet from Marche made with figs, walnuts, almonds and star aniseed
Lose golose		Piedmontese sweet made with peaches, butter almonds, eggs and sugar
Lu serpe		Snake-shaped Christmas cake from Marche

=== M ===
Name	Image	Description
Macafame		Cake made with bread, milk, honey, eggs and raisins, originally from Vicenza, Veneto
Maccheroni con le noci		Sweet from Lazio and Umbria made with tagliatelle, walnuts, cinnamon, nutmeg and sugar
Mandorla riccia di Francavilla Fontana		Almonds coated in sugar and lemon, originally from Francavilla Fontana, Apulia
Mandorlato		Christmas sweet from Cologna Veneta made with almonds, honey, eggs whites and sugar
Mandorlato al cioccolato di Modigliana Fontana		Almond and chocolate cake from Modigliana, Emilia-Romagna
Mandorlini del ponte		Almond pastries from Pontelagoscuro, Emilia-Romagna
Margheritine di Stresa		Biscuits created in 1857 in Stresa, Piedmont
Marillenknödel		South Tyrolean, Austrian and Czech apricot dumplings
Maritozzo		Enriched bun filled with whipped cream
Marron glacé		Chestnuts candied in sugar syrup
Marzipan		Confection consisting primarily of sugar, honey, and almond meal
Mastazzoli		Sicilian sweets made with fig opuntia, walnuts, vanilla, cherries and candied fruit
Mécoulin		Sweet bread from Cogne, Aosta Valley
Miacetto		Romagnol Christmas sweet made with honey, raisins and nuts
Miascia		Lombard dessert made with stale bread, apples, milk, eggs and sugar
Migliaccio campano		Campanian Carnival cake made with millet, semolina, ricotta, orange zest, eggs and sugar
Migliaccio romagnolo		Romagnol cake made with pig's blood, nuts and sugar
Ministeriale		Medallion-shaped chocolate created in Naples in 1905
Minna di virgini		Pastries filled with cream, zuccata, chocolate and cinnamon, originally from Sambuca di Sicilia
Mistocchina		Chestnut-flour pastry from Emilia-Romagna
Mohnmingilan		South Tyrolean fried doughnuts filled with poppy seeds and cinnamon
Mostaccino		Spicy biscuit from Crema, Lombardy
'Mpanatigghi		Sicilian pastries filled with almonds, walnuts, sugar, chocolate, cinnamon, cloves and minced meat
Muccellato		Calabrian Easter cake
Muccunetti		Sicilian pastries filled with zuccata and almonds
Mustacciuoli		Pastry with a spiced, cake-like interior, covered in chocolate
Mustazzoleddus		Sardinian almond biscuits flavoured with sambuca and orange blossom water
Mustazzoli		Pastries made with flour, sugar, almonds, lemon and cinnamon

=== N ===
Name	Image	Description
Nacatole		Calabrian anise-flavoured doughnuts
Nadalin		Veronese Christmas sweet bread
Neapolitan ice cream		Ice cream featuring three flavors: chocolate, vanilla, and strawberry
Neccio		Tuscan chestnut flour galette
Nevola		Abruzzese pastry made with grape must, cinnamon and orange zest
Niggilal		Fried pastry from the Puster Valley
Nocciolini di Canzo		Crumbly small hazelnut cookies from Canzo, Lombardy
Nocciolini di Chivasso		Crumbly small hazelnut cookies from Chivasso, Piedmont
Novellino		Biscuit
Nozza		Sweet flavoured with Rosolio and aniseed, originally from Calcinaia, Tuscany
Nucàtuli		Sicilian biscuits filled with figs, raisins, almonds, walnuts, orange and lemon zest.
Nutella		Sweetened hazelnut spread
'Nzuddha		Human or animal-shaped pastry from Soriano Calabro

=== O ===
Name	Image	Description
Occhio di bue		Biscuit with jam
Offelle di Parona		Biscuits from Parona, Lombardy
Olivette di Sant'Agata		Green olive-shaped almond pastries from Catania, Sicily
Orilletas		Sardinian honey-covered fried pastries
Ossa di morto		Sicilian biscuits prepared for Day of the Dead
Ostie ripiene		Wafers filled with almonds, honey and cinnamon, originally from Monte Sant'Angelo, Apulia

=== P ===
Name	Image	Description
Pagnotta di San Martino		Romagnol sweet bread enriched with nutmeg, nuts and raisins
Pagnotta pasquale		Romagnol Easter cake
Palacinta		Pancake eaten in the provinces of Trieste and Gorizia
Palummeddi		Sicilian dove-shaped Easter pastries
Pan co' santi		Tuscan sweet bread filled with walnuts, dried fruit, honey, Vin santo and pepper
Pan dei morti		Sweet prepared for the Day of the Dead, containing eggs, dried figs, vin santo, amaretti, almonds, raisins, sugar and spices
Pan dell'orso		Abruzzese cake made with almond flour, bitter almonds, eggs, butter and honey
Pan della Marchesa		Piedmontese hazelnut cake
Pan di ramerino		Tuscan sweet bread filled with raisins and rosemary
Pan di Spagna		Classic Italian sponge cake and a fundamental preparation (Masse montate leggere) in pastry
Pan meino		Lombard sweet flatbread flavoured with elderflower
Pan minisc'		Lucan dessert made with grape must, flour and sugar
Pandolce		Ligurian fruit cake
Pandoli di Schio		Biscuits from Schio, Veneto
Pandoro		Traditional Veronese sweet bread in a star-like formation
Pane dell'Assedio		Sweet bread from Asola, Lombardy
Pànera		Coffee semifreddo from Genoa
Panettone		Milanese sweet bread featuring dried fruits
Panficato		Sweet from Isola del Giglio, Tuscany, made with figs and grapes
Panforte		Chewy Tuscan Christmas dessert containing fruits and nuts
Pangiallo		Roman sweet made with flour, raisins, honey and nuts
Panina		Romagnol and Tuscan Christmas cake
Paniscedda		Sardinian sweet made with candied fruit, spices and cooked must
Panna cotta		Dessert of sweetened cream thickened with gelatin and molded
Panone		Christmas cake from Molinella, Emilia, containing candied fruit, cocoa, chocolate and raisins
Panpepato		Round sweet bread with nuts and dried fruit
Papasìn		Mantuan sweet made with chestnut flour, raisins and pine nuts
Papassinu		Sardinian pastry filled with grape must, almonds, raisins and walnuts
Pardulas		Sardinian ricotta-filled pies
Parrozzo		Abruzzese Christmas cake
Pasimata		Tuscan Easter bread
Pasta di mandorle		Almond paste
Pasta Elena		Ricotta-filled pastry from Favara, Sicily
Paste di meliga		Piedmontese biscuits made with flour, maize flour, eggs, sugar, honey, butter and lemon zest
Pasticciotto		Pastry filled with ricotta cheese and egg custard, originally from Lecce, Apulia
Pastiera		Neapolitan tart made with cooked wheat, eggs, ricotta cheese, and flavoured with orange flower water
Patacia		Lombard fried doughnut
Pepatelli		Abruzzese biscuits made with flour, honey, almonds, orange zest and pepper
Pere al vino		Piedmontese and French dessert consisting in pears with red wine
Pesche di Prato		Peach-shaped pastries filled with custard, originally from Prato, Tuscany
Pesche dolci		Peach-shaped pastries with fillings
Pesche ripiene		Oven-baked peaches with fillings
Petit four		Sardinian and Piedmontese biscuits made with almond paste and candied fruit
Petrafennula		Sicilian nougat
Petrali		Christmas pastry from Calabria made with coffee, vino cotto, figs, walnuts, almonds, raisins, orange and mandarine zest
Pignoccata		Sicilian honey-covered fried doughnuts
Pignolata al miele		Balls of dough fried and covered in honey
Pignolata		Soft pastry, covered in chocolate and lemon-flavoured syrup or icing, originally from Messina, Sicily
Pinza		Traditional dessert flan with pine nuts, dried figs, raisins, fennel seeds and grappa
Pinza bolognese		Mostarda-filled pastry from Bologna
Pinza triestina		Julian Easter bread
Piparella		Sicilian and Calabrian biscuit made with flour, honey and almonds
Pistiddu		Sardinian Vincotto-filled pastry
Pitta di San Martino		Christmas pastry from Calabria
Pitta 'mpigliata		Christmas cake from Calabria filled with dried fruits, honey and spices
Pitteddhre		Apulian Christmas tarts
Pizza dolce di Beridde		Judeo-Roman unleavened sweet bread with almonds, raisins, white wine, olive oil and candied fruit
Polenta d'Ivrea		Piedmontese maize-flour, honey and orange juice cake
Polenta del Marengo		Maize-flour, raisins and almonds cake from Alessandria
Polenta dolce		Maize-flour cake
Polenta e osei		Sponge cake covered in almond paste, originally from Bergamo, Lombardy
Poperati		Apulian sweet taralli
Presnitz		Julian sweet made with walnuts, almonds, pine nuts, figs, raisins, plums, apricots, cinnamon, cloves and rum
Puoti		Biscuits from the province of Verona, Veneto
Pupazza frascatana		Woman-shaped sweet from Frascati, Lazio
Pupi cull'ova		Doll-shaped pastries from Nicosia, Sicily
Pupi di zucchero		Sicilian coloured statues made of sugar
Purceddhruzzi		Christmas dessert
Purcidd'		Christmas sweets from Martina Franca, Apulia
Putizza		Julian cake with raisins, apricot jam, walnuts, hazelnuts, almonds, rum, cinnamon, cloves and orange zest

=== Q ===
Name	Image	Description
Quaresimali		Biscuits prepared during Lent

=== R ===
Name	Image	Description
Raffiolini		Biscuits from Caltanissetta, Sicily
Raffiuoli		Neapolitan sugar-coated sponge cake
Rame di Napoli		Chocolate biscuits from Catania, Sicily
Raviola di ricotta nissena		Ricotta-filled puff pastry from Caltanissetta, Sicily
Raviole bolognesi		Bolognese pastries filled with Bolognese mostarda
Ravioli dolci		Sweet filled dumplings
Ricciarelli		Traditional biscuits from Siena, Tuscany – specifically, a type of macaroon
Ricciolina		Chocolate cake from Abbadia San Salvatore, Tuscany
Ricciolino		Mantuan biscuit
Risino		Veronese pastry filled with rice and custard
Risiny		Ligurian budino
Rocciata		Cake from Umbria and Marche filled with apples, figs, alchermes, raisins, cinnamon, pine nuts and jam
Roccocò		Neapolitan pastry made with spices, almonds, flour and sugar
Rollò		Swiss roll filled with ricotta and marzipan, originally from Caltanissetta, Sicily
Rosa del deserto		Almond cookies with raising covered in cereal flakes
Rosacatarre		Molisan and Lucan rose-shaped fried sweets
Rossana		Candy made in 1926 by Luisa Spagnoli and Federico Seneca
Rossumata		Spoon sweet made with wine, sugar and eggs
Rustici di Montalcino		Almond biscuits from Montalcino, Tuscany

=== S ===
Name	Image	Description
Sabadone		Sweet dumplings from Emilia-Romagna filled with chestnuts and Saba
Sacripantina		Genoese cake
Salame di cioccolato		Chocolate salami
Salòt		Cake from Bra, Piedmont, filled with apricot jam, raisins and candied citrus
Sanguinaccio dolce		Pudding made from pig's blood which is made creamy and sweetened with ingredients such as chocolate, milk, pine nuts, and raisins
Sannacchiudere		Lucan Christmas sweets with orange blossom water and honey
Sasanello gravinese		Sweet from Gravina in Puglia
Savòr		Jam from Emilia-Romagna made with quince, fresh fruit and cooked must
Sbrisolona		Mantuan almond cake
Scarcella		Easter sweet from Manfredonia, Apulia
Scarpaccia		Tuscan sweet bread containing courgettes
Scarpedd		Lucan Christmas fried dough
Scarsella orbetellana		Easter cake from Orbetello, Tuscany
Schiaccia briaca		Cake from Elba, Tuscany, made with Alchermes and dried fruit
Schiaccia campigliese		Cake from Campiglia Marittima, Tuscany
Schiacciata alla fiorentina		Florentine sponge cake
Schiacciata con l'uva		Tuscan grape cake
Schiacciata di Pasqua		Tuscan Easter cake
Scroccafusi		Carnival fried doughnuts from Marche
Scumuni		Sicilian frozen dessert
Seada		Sardinian fried pastry filled with pecorino and honey
Semifreddo		Frozen dessert similar to ice cream, with the main ingredients being egg yolks, sugar, and cream
Semolino dolce		Piedmontese semolina cake
Serpentone		Snake-shaped cake made with almond paste, almonds and candied cherries
Sfincia		Fried doughnut from the province of Trapani, Sicily
Sfincia di San Giuseppe		Sicilian ricotta-filled fried pastry
Sfincione di riso		Sicilian fried sweet containing rice and milk
Sfinge		Sicilian doughnut sprinkled with powdered sugar
Sfogliatella		Neapolitan shell-shaped cream-filled Italian pastry
Sfoglio polizzano		Cake filled with tuma, cinnamon, chocolate and sugar, originally from Polizzi Generosa, Sicily
Sfratto di Pitigliano		Jewish cake filled with walnuts, honey, aniseed, nutmeg and orange zest, originally from Pitigliano, Tuscany
Sgaiozzi		Abruzzese fried pastries made with flour, potatoes, raisins and sugar
Sgriesolona		Cake from the province of Padua, Veneto
Sguta		Easter cake from Calabria
Sise delle monache		Abruzzese pastries filled with custard
Sorbetto		Sorbet
Sospiro		Apulian sweet
Spina santa		Easter sweet from Caltanissetta, Sicily, shaped like a crown of thorns
Spongada		Lombard sweet flatbread
Spongarda		Lombard cake made with honey, hazelnuts, walnuts, almonds, spices and citrus
Spongata		Christmas cake made with almonds, white wine, butter, honey, walnuts, hazelnut, pine nuts, raisins, candied orange and spices
Spuma di mandorla		Christmas almond sweet from Molfetta
Spumone		Neapolitan molded gelato made with layers of different colors and flavors, usually containing candied fruits and nuts
Squiccia		Cake from Tortona, Piedmont
Stomatico		Biscuit from Reggio Calabria made with flour, honey, cinnamon, cloves, almonds, olive oil and sugar
Straboli		Tyrolean funnel cake
Stroscia		Ligurian olive oil cake
Strucchi		Sweets from Friuli-Venezia Giulia filled with walnuts, hazelnuts, pine nuts, raisins, lemon zest, sugar and grappa
Strufoli di Carnevale		Umbrian fried doughnuts covered in honey
Struffoli		Neapolitan dish made of deep fried balls of sweet dough and honey
Sugolo		Dessert pudding prepared with the must of red grapes, flour and sugar, cooked slowly and then left to cool
Susamielli		S-shaped Christmas pastries from Naples

=== T ===
Name	Image	Description
Tapít		Biscuits from Oleggio, Piedmont
Taralli		Cracker similar to a breadstick--can be sweet or savory
Taralli di Sant'Antonio		Biscuits from Giuliano Teatino, Abruzzo
Tartufo di Pizzo		Gelato covered and filled with melted chocolate, originally from Pizzo, Calabria
Tegola dolce		Aostan biscuit made with flour, almonds, hazelnuts, butter, eggs and sugar
Tenerina		Ferrarese chocolate cake
Testa di moro		Neapolitan sponge cake with custard and cocoa
Tetta della monaca		Sweet from Altamura, Apulia
Timballo di Martin Sec		Piedmontese pear sweet
Tiramisù		Dessert made of ladyfingers dipped in coffee, layered with a whipped mixture of eggs, sugar, and mascarpone, flavoured with cocoa
Torcetti		Piedmontese biscuits
Torciglione		Filled brioche from Messina, Sicily
Torcolo di San Costanzo		Ring-shaped cake with candied fruit and raisins from Perugia, Umbria
Torrone		Nougat made with honey, sugar, and whipped egg whites, then filled with roasted pistachios and almonds
Torrone di Caltanissetta		Nougat with pistachios and almonds from Caltanissetta, Sicily
Torrone di Guardiagrele		Nougat from Guardiagrele, Abruzzo, made with toasted almonds, candied fruit and cinnamon
Torrone gelato		Calabrian soft nougat made with almonds, candied fruit, citrus and dark chocolate
Torrone Nurzia		Abruzzese nougat made with cocoa, vanilla and hazelnuts
Torta 900		Chocolate cake from Ivrea, Piedmont
Torta Barozzi		Thin, crispy cake made from chocolate and coffee, originally from Vignola, Emilia-Romagna
Torta beca		Cake from Trentino made with stale bread, milk and raisins
Torta bertolina		Lombard fox grape cake
Torta caprese		Cake from Capri, Campania, made with chocolate and either almonds or hazelnuts
Torta co' bischeri		Tuscan cake rice cake
Torta degli addobbi		Emilian rice cake
Torta del buonumore		Costmary cake from Castel Goffredo
Torta del Donizetti		Pineapple and apricot cake from Bergamo
Torta della nonna		Cake filled with custard and covered with pine nuts and confectioner's sugar
Torta delle rose		Mantuan cake made with leavened dough rich in butter and sugar, which is rolled up and placed in the baking tin, taking the characteristic shape of a basket of rosebuds
Torta di fioretto		Lombard sweet flatbread topped with wild fennel
Torta di nocciole		Piedmontese hazelnut cake
Torta di San Biagio		Mantuan tart
Torta di tagliatelle		Emilian and Lombard tagliatelle cake
Torta di tagliatelline		Emilian tagliatelle and almonds cake
Torta diplomatica		Cake made with crema diplomatica
Torta Elvezia		Mantuan cake made with almond flour, eggs, butter and sugar
Torta Fedora		Sicilian sponge cake with ricotta, pistachios and candied cherries
Torta gianduia		Piedmontese gianduja cake
Torta greca		Judeo-Mantuan cake
Torta mantovana		Mantuan cake
Torta margherita		Soft cake
Torta mimosa		Cake from Rieti, Lazio
Torta monferrina		Piedmontese cake made from pumpkin, or apples and sugar, with amaretti, chocolate, eggs, and rum
Torta nera di San Secondo		Cake from San Secondo Parmense, Emilia, with coffee, chocolate and almonds
Torta Ostiglia		Cake from Ostiglia, Lombardy, made with egg whites, zabajone and almonds
Torta paesana		Lombard cake made with bread, milk, pine nuts, amaretti, raisins, citrus, butter, eggs and cocoa
Torta paradiso		Mantuan cake
Torta pazientina		Paduan layer cake with zabajone and almonds
Torta secca di Carpenedolo		Cake from Carpenedolo, Lombardy
Torta setteveli		Chocolate cake with seven layers of hazelnut cream, hazelnut crunch, chocolate mousse, and a glaze
Torta Tre Monti		Sammarinese dessert consisting of thin waffle slices with interwoven layers of cream, then covered in chocolate
Torta Zurigo		Chocolate cake with cherries and crème chantilly, originally from Pinerolo, Piedmont
Tortellino dolce di Marianna		Sweet from Castel Goffredo, Lombardy, filled with cinnamon, cloves, pine nuts, raisins, plum jam, chestnut cream and cocoa
Tortionata		Almond sweet from Lodi, Lombardy
Tortolèti coi puriòni		Cake from Primiero, Trentino, with wild mint and grappa
Treccia d'oro		Cake filled with candied fruit, originally from Crema, Lombardy
Treccia mochena		Cake from Trentino filled with custard and blueberry jam
Tressian		Maize-flour cake from the province of Verona, Veneto
Tricotto		Sicilian thrice-cooked biscuit
Turtèl sguasaròt		Lombard sweet filled with beans, cinnamon, cloves, nutmeg, vino cotto and sugar

=== U ===
Name	Image	Description
Uovo sbattuto		Beverage that consists of egg yolk and sugar

=== V ===
Name	Image	Description
Vartanush		Venetian rose petal jam, originally from Armenia
Veneziana		Milanese pastry
Viennese		Custard-filled pastry from Messina, Sicily

=== Z ===
Name	Image	Description
Zabaione		Piedmontese dessert beverage made with egg yolks, sugar, and a sweet wine
Zelten		Traditional Tyrolean fruitcake served during Christmas
Zeppole		Fried dough dessert with powdered sugar
Zirotto		Biscuit from the province of Padua, Veneto, made with maize flour, fig syrup and must
Zonclada		Filled cake from Treviso, Veneto
Zuccata		Sicilian candied pumpkin
Zuccherini bolognesi		Bolognese biscuits
Zuccherini montanari		Emilian and Tuscan biscuits
Zuccotto		Tuscan semi-frozen, chilled dessert made with alchermes liqueur, cake and ice cream
Zuppa Inglese		Dessert layering custard, alchermes liqueur and sponge cake

== See also ==
Media related to Sweet food of Italy at Wikimedia Commons

- Italian cuisine
- List of desserts
- List of Italian dishes – Desserts and pastry
- Sicilian cuisine – Desserts and sweets
