= Holy Spina (sweet) =

Italian sweet

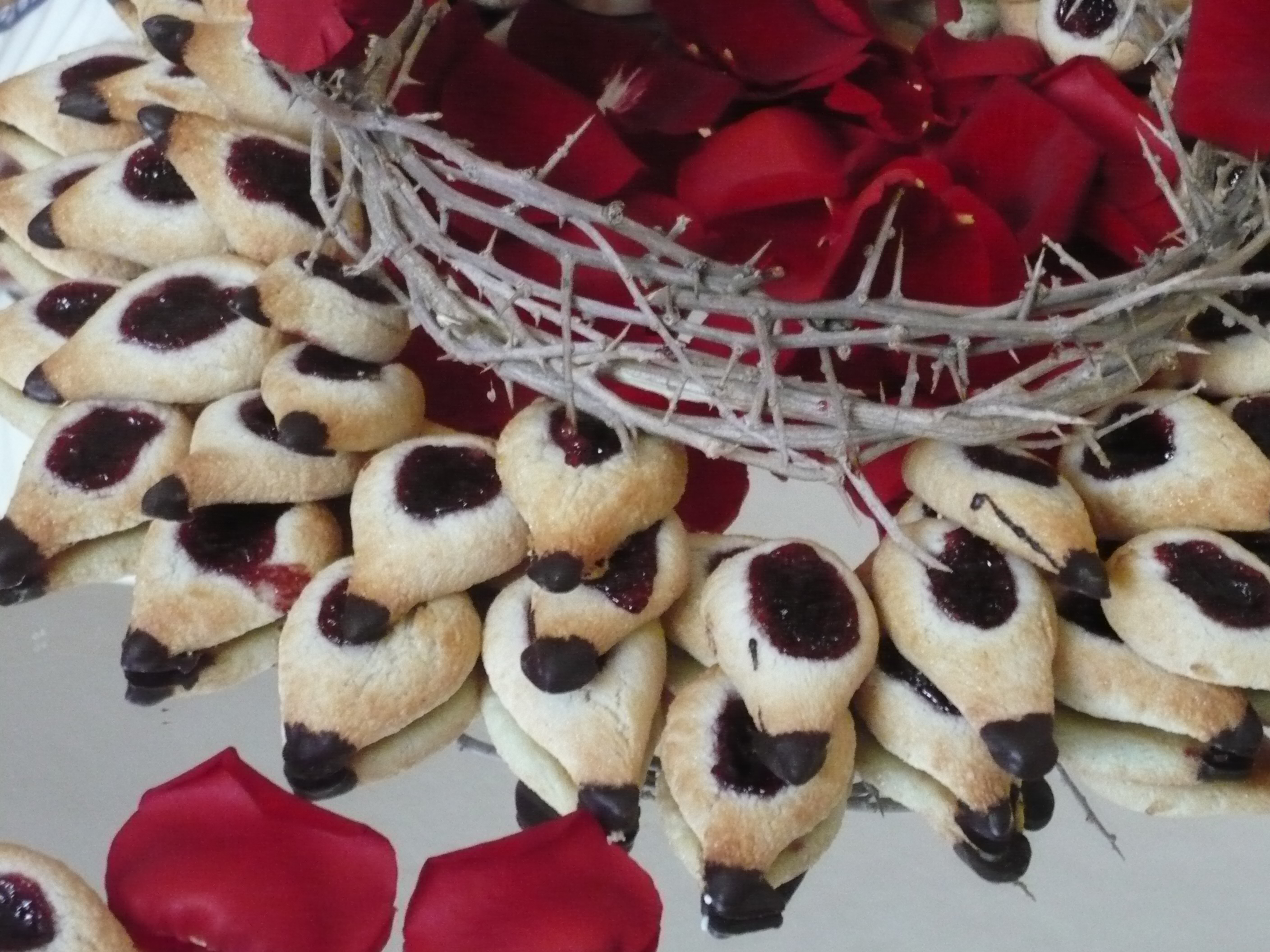
Spina Santa composition with marruca plant

The Spina Santa or Holy Spina sweet it is one of the typical Nisseni sweets born of the Benedictine monastery in Italy, together with the crocetta di Caltanissetta. Both were prepared and donated during the feast of the Holy Crucifix on September 14 by the cloistered nuns of the Benedictine monastery annexed to the church of Santa Croce.

The name derives from the Marruca plant (Paliurus spina-christi Mill.) with which they are presented, whose branches, it is said, were woven for the crown of thorns that was placed on the head of Jesus.

== Ingredients ==
The ingredients of the Holy spina are typical of the Caltanissetta area at the beginning of the last century. They are almonds, sugar, sweet mulberry purée and dark chocolate.

The Holy Spina is a typical Sicilian convent sweet.

== See also ==
- List of Italian desserts and pastries
