= Cupeta =

Italian dessert

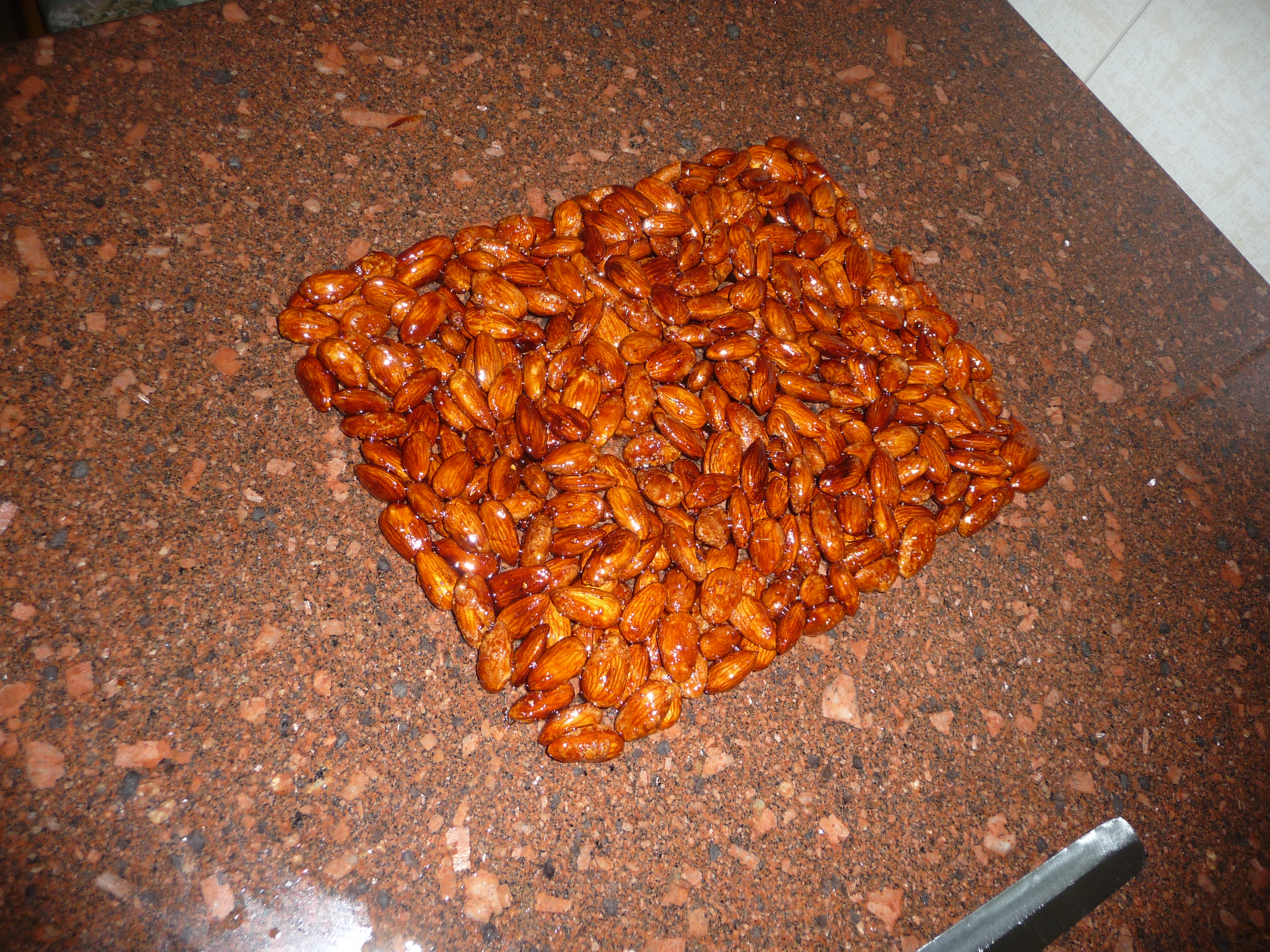
- Alternative names: Copeta
- Course: Dessert
- Place of origin: Italy
- Region or state: Calabria

Cupeta or copeta (originating from Arabic qubbayt, literally meaning 'preserved sweet') is a dessert made from honey, dissolved sugar and diced almonds.

Cupeta is usually consumed during the Christmas period in the Calabria, Campania, Apulia and Sicily regions of Italy, as well as in Ponente Ligure, where on the other hand it is prepared all-year-long.

== Etymology ==
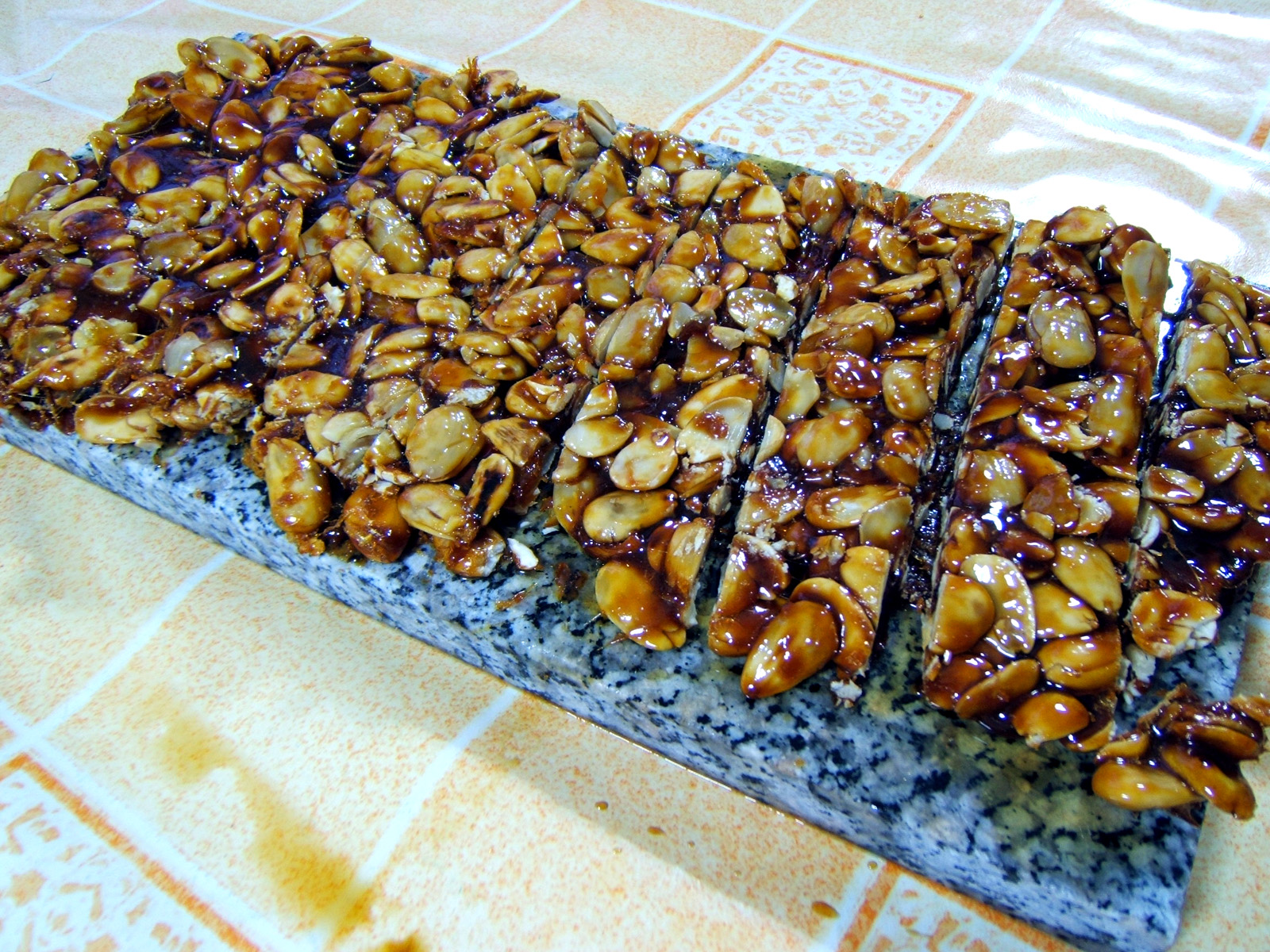
Croccante di mandorle

Several sources (including official Italian ministerial ones) state that the name comes from the Latin word cupedia; however, this is an incorrect etymological attribution made by Matteo Camera in 1838. The similar Latin terms cupedia and copadia respectively mean 'sweat treats' and 'meat pieces'.

Some sources hold the view that the name cupeta, on the other hand, comes from the Arabic word qubbayt, literally meaning 'sweet preserve', and was documented for the first time in a document from Palermo of 1287, where a cubaydario cited (a producer of cubaita, a dessert made of apples, almonds, toasted chickpeas and sesami seeds).

The name is then mentioned by Giambattista Basile (Naples, 600s) twice; in the Lo cunto de li cunti overo lo trattamento de peccerille and in the Le cinco figlie, as well as by Giulio Cesare Cortese in the Micco Passaro nnammorato.

== History ==
The word cupeta is of Latin or Arabic origins. The first explicit record of its existence in Italy dates back to 1287.

The dessert was part of the wedding feast of Bona Sforza and Sigismund I the Old in 1517.

== Preparation method ==
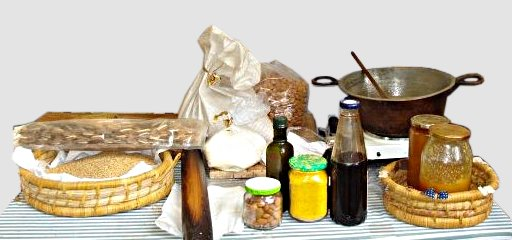
Ingredients used to make cupeta

Cupeta is made from a liquified mixture of almonds, honey and sugar; which is then either left to solidify or consumed in a semi-liquid form. The specific recipe, which may include additional ingredients, varies from region to region and may present differences depending family traditions.

The preparation method is similar to the one used for giurgiulena, which however differs in the addition of sesame seeds.

Cupeta was awarded the recognition of being a prodotto agroalimentare tradizionale calabrese, campano and pugliese ('traditional agri-food product from Calabria, Campania and Apulia').

=== Variants ===
In Campania, copeta is produced in the provinces of Avellino, Benevento and Salerno and is considered a white, compact, torrone flavoured with hazelnuts, almonds and pistachios.

In the province of Rieti, Lazio, and in the Abruzzo region, copeta is prepared with honey and diced walnuts, and is usually soft and in the shape of a square rather than being crunchy and rectangular; it is usually served on Laurus nobilis leaves, used as a container and preserver.

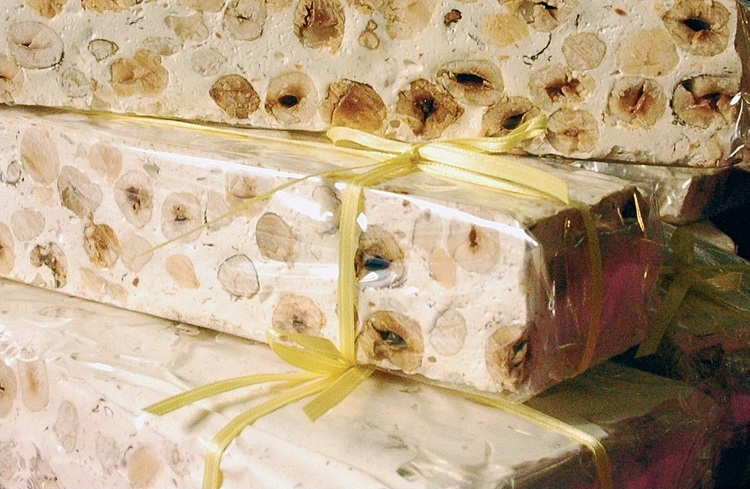
Copeta campana

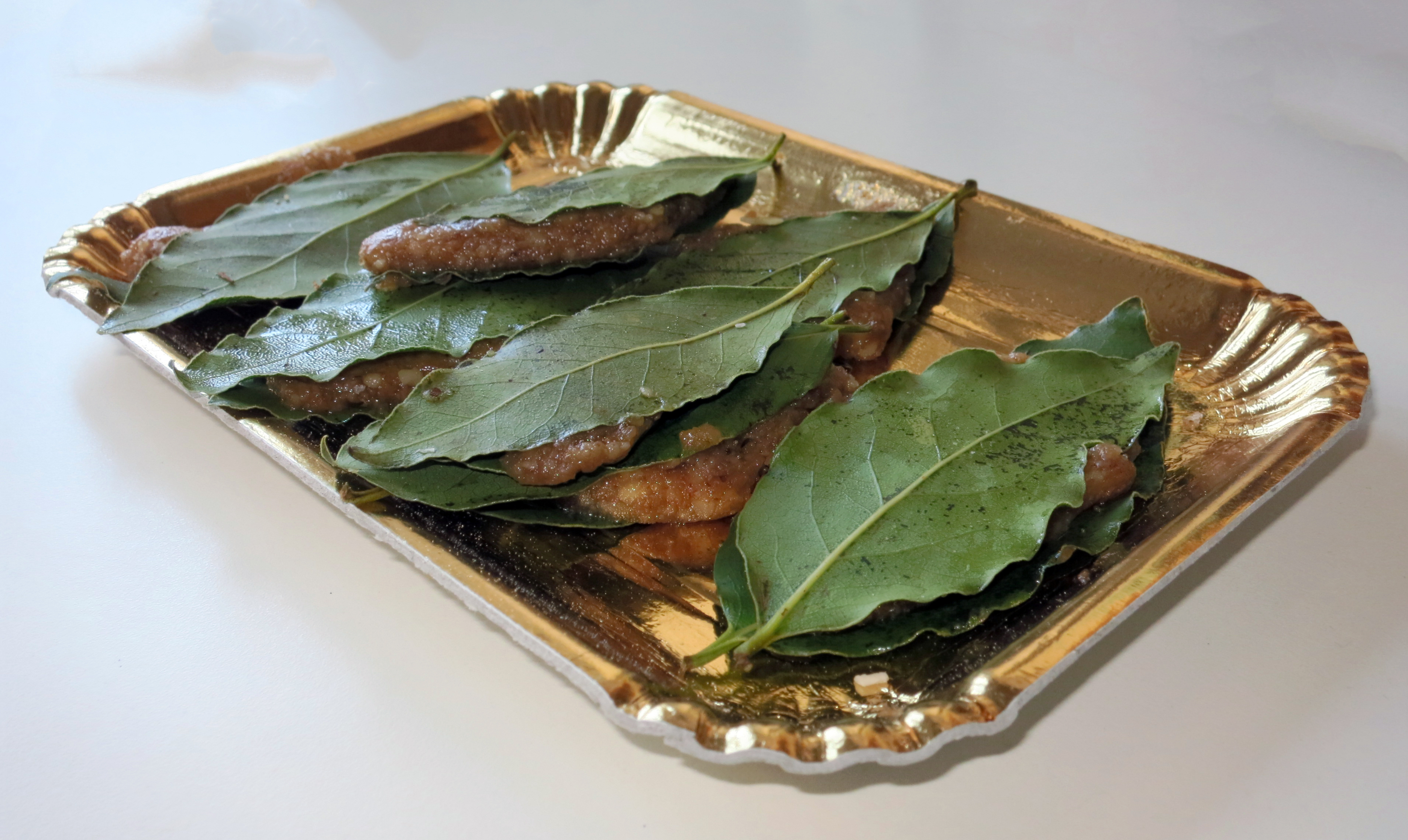
Copeta morbida reatina

== See also ==
- List of Italian desserts and pastries

== Bibliography ==
- Pitaro Francesco, La copéta, l'antico dolce natalizio calabrese, Grafiche Lucia, 2008.
- Sebastiano Rizza,Cupeta: storia di un dolce enigma, https://web.archive.org/web/20160313115903/http://digilander.libero.it/cultura.popolare/pignola/parole/cupeta.html.
