= Pevarini =

Traditional cookie of Venice

- Place of origin: Italy
- Region or state: Venice, Veneto
- Main ingredients: Molasses, lard, white pepper, flour

Pevarini (misspelled peverini in one notable source) is a traditional pepper cookie of Venice, Italy. It is traditionally made with molasses, lard, white pepper, and flour. Modern recipes for pevarini often use butter as a substitute for lard. Spices such as cinnamon, nutmeg, and cloves are common additions to the cookie.

Pevarini take their name from pevare, which means 'pepper' in the Venetian dialect. Cookies spiced with pepper exist in some other cultures, including the pepernoten of the Netherlands and pepparkakor of Sweden.

== See also ==
- List of Italian desserts and pastries
