= Confetti di Sulmona =

Italian confectionery specialities

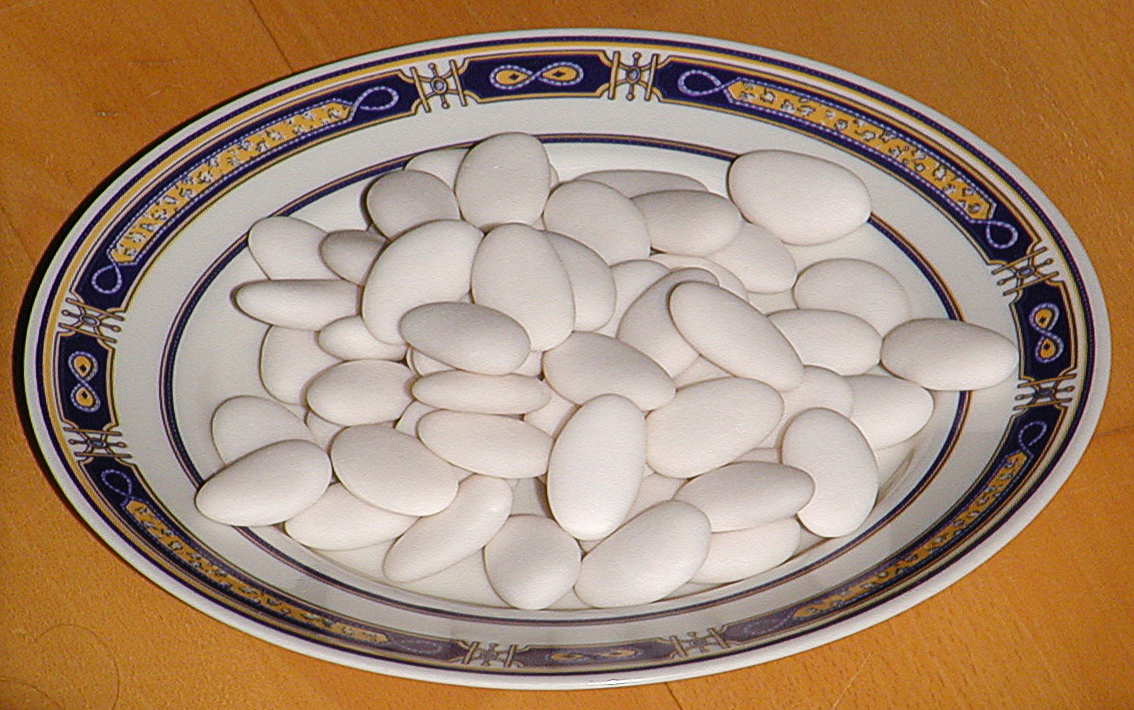
Confetti di Sulmona

Confetti di Sulmona (sing.: confetto di Sulmona) are Italian sugared almond confectionery specialities from the comune (municipality) of Sulmona, in the province of L'Aquila, Abruzzo, where the oldest confectionery factory is located. They are commonly given as favours for weddings or other celebrations.

Confetti di Sulmona are listed as a prodotto agroalimentare tradizionale (PAT) by the Ministry of Agricultural, Food and Forestry Policies.

== See also ==
Media related to Confetti di Sulmona at Wikimedia Commons

- List of Italian desserts and pastries
- List of almond dishes
