= Abbamele =

Honey-based product from Sardinia

Abbamele (also known as abbatu, abbathu or abbatzu in Sardinian) is a honey-based product from the rural culture of the Sardinia region of Italy. The Sardinian name is also Italianized into sapa di miele ('honey sapa').

== Preparation ==
According to the traditional methods of preparation, honeycombs are crushed, and the balls of wax containing 20-30% of honey are collected in generic containers. In the days immediately after all the honey extract has settled, the remaining combs containing honey and pollen are dipped in hot water (~ 50 °C), so that the water dissolves all the honey still present in the combs. At this point, any remaining lumps of wax and pollen are broken up through the use of a suitable mixer or by hand. The remaining wax is then pressed further to squeeze out any remaining liquid and is then stored in appropriate containers.

The remaining liquid from the previous step is filtered, for example with a linen cloth, at least twice, and then placed in a suitable high-capacity boiler (sometimes made of copper) where it is boiled and concentrated via decoction. During this concentration process, finely cut lemon or orange rinds are added, and any impurities on the surface of the liquid are removed. The content of the boiler becomes gradually syrupy and must be kept in constant motion to prevent the product from sticking to the bottom and developing a smoky flavour. The liquid also becomes caramelized, becoming dark like molasses but much more complex, with a toasty flavour that has hints of coffee and caramel. When the liquid assumes a consistency similar to that of honey, the heating is interrupted, and the boiler is deposited in a secluded place and allowed to cool before the abbamele is drained.

The resulting abbamele has a concentrated honey flavour, and is commonly eaten with dairy products like cheese or yogurt, for example salted or smoked ricotta cheese. Abbamele is also often used in fruit salads, and paired with even pasta or vegetables. Abbamele is also occasionally used in substitution of other sweeteners like saba (a syrup made by boiling grape must with walnuts).

== See also ==
- List of Italian desserts and pastries
