= Cassatella di Agira =

Italian sweet

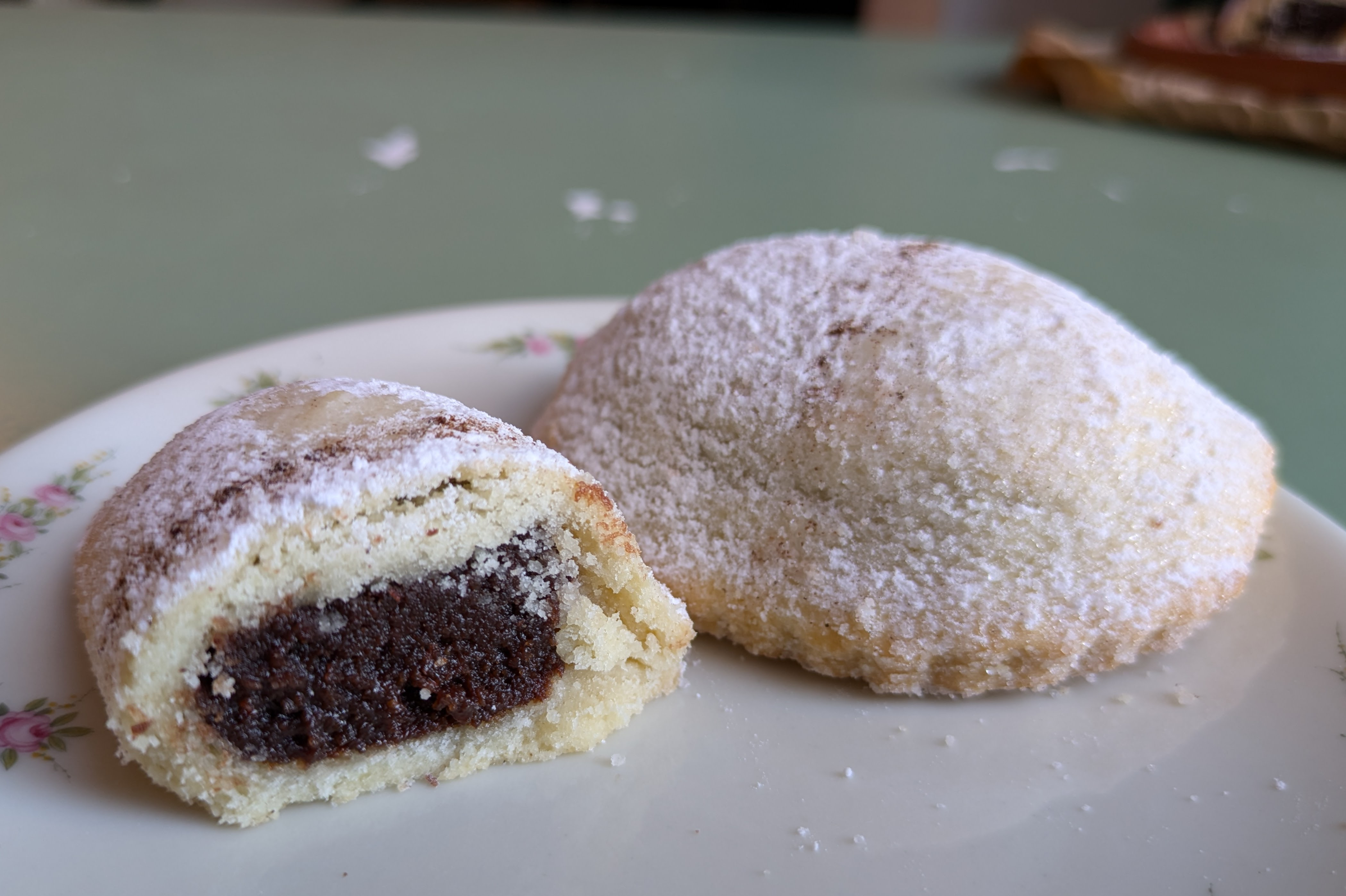
- Type: Sweet
- Place of origin: Italy
- Region or state: Agira, Sicily
- Main ingredients: Chickpea or durum wheat flour, almonds, cocoa, eggs and sugar

Cassatella di Agira is a traditional sweet from the Enna gastronomy, originating in the town of Agira and widely found not only in the province of Enna but throughout much of eastern Sicily. As a typical Sicilian product, they have been officially recognized and included in the list of traditional Italian agri-food products (P.A.T) by the Ministry of Agricultural, Food and Forestry Policies (Mipaaf).

These pastries, characteristic of the Enna pastry tradition, are crescent-shaped and made from a tender shortcrust pastry that is golden yellow and dusted with powdered sugar. The filling consists of a mixture of cocoa, ground almonds, chickpea flour, sugar, and dried lemon zest, with optional cinnamon added.

A festival dedicated to the Cassatelle di Agira takes place in the hometown of Diodorus Siculus, Agira. These sweets are available year-round in restaurants, bars, and pastry shops throughout the Enna province and in numerous restaurants in Catania. Some renowned pastry chefs have reinterpreted the traditional recipe, creating an excellent pistachio variant.

Given that the production process is labor-intensive and involves several carefully guarded steps passed down through generations, variations in the manufacturing of this sweet can be significant. Recently, there has been a notable increase in imitations that bear little resemblance to the original product.

The authenticity and typicality of Cassatelle di Agira can be verified by their dimensions, which are typically 10 × 6 cm. Additionally, the dough should be soft and not dry or crumbly; neither chocolate nor cocoa should dominate the flavor—both almond taste should also be perceptible. Finally, the shortcrust pastry should not be overcooked or soggy.

== See also ==
- List of Italian desserts and pastries
