= Gelo di melone =

Jellied watermelon pudding

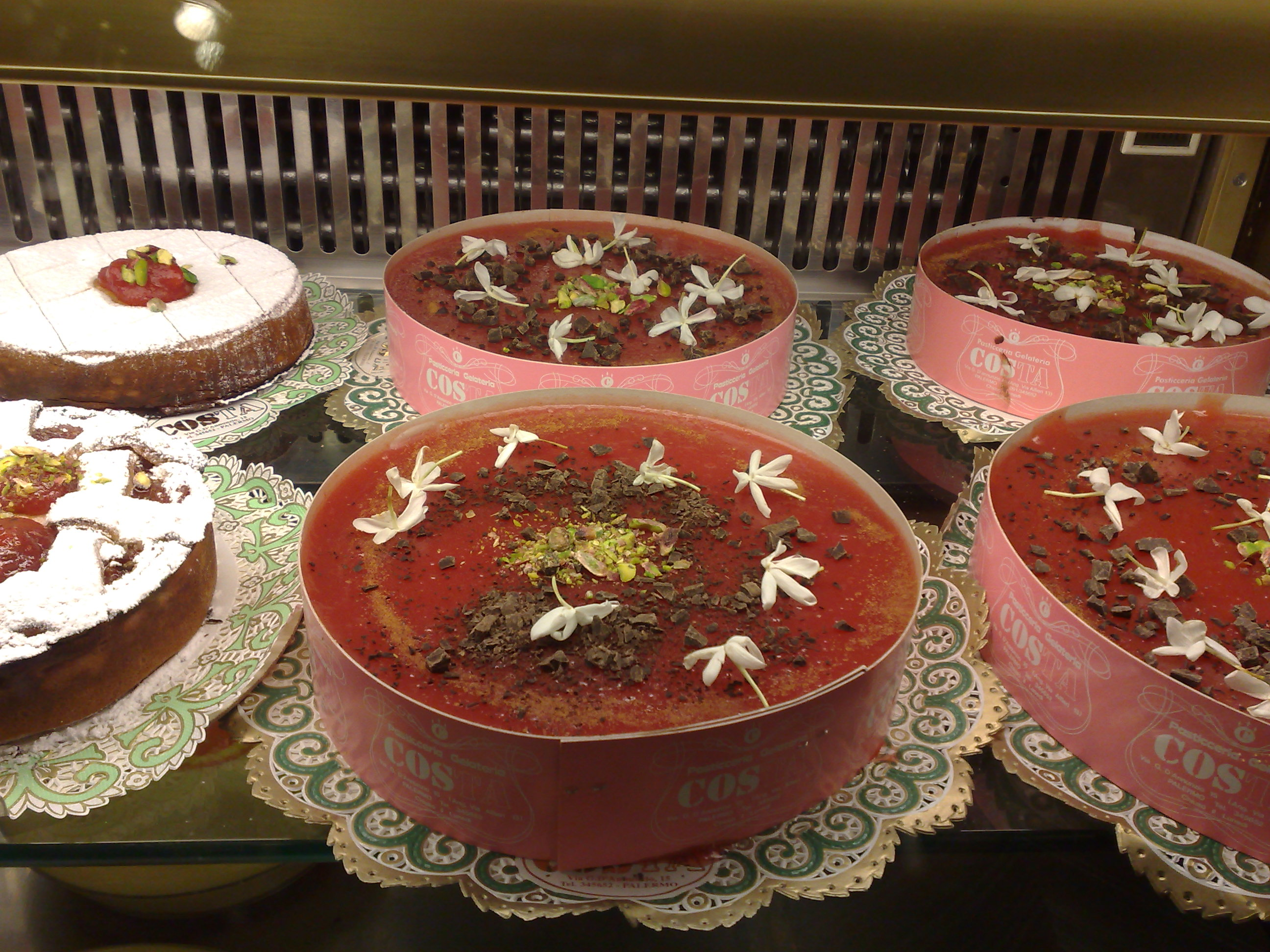
Gelo di melone

Gelo di melone (Sicilian: gelu di muluni), also known as gelo d'anguria, is a Sicilian jelly dessert consisting of a watermelon pudding served throughout summer. Traditionally prepared on Ferragosto, it is also popular for the Saint Rosalia celebrations in the city of Palermo.

Its basic ingredients are watermelon pulp, sugar (or honey), and starch, while pistachios, candied fruit, cinnamon, and jasmine water are often added. Jasmine is often added, in the pudding as jasmine water, and as a garnish with jasmine flowers. Small pieces of chocolate may be added to invoke watermelon seeds. It is commonly, although mistakenly, considered an inheritance of Arab influence dating to the Muslim period.

== See also ==
- Sicilian cuisine
- List of Italian desserts and pastries
