= Raviola di ricotta di Caltanissetta =

Italian sweet

Raviola di ricotta nissena
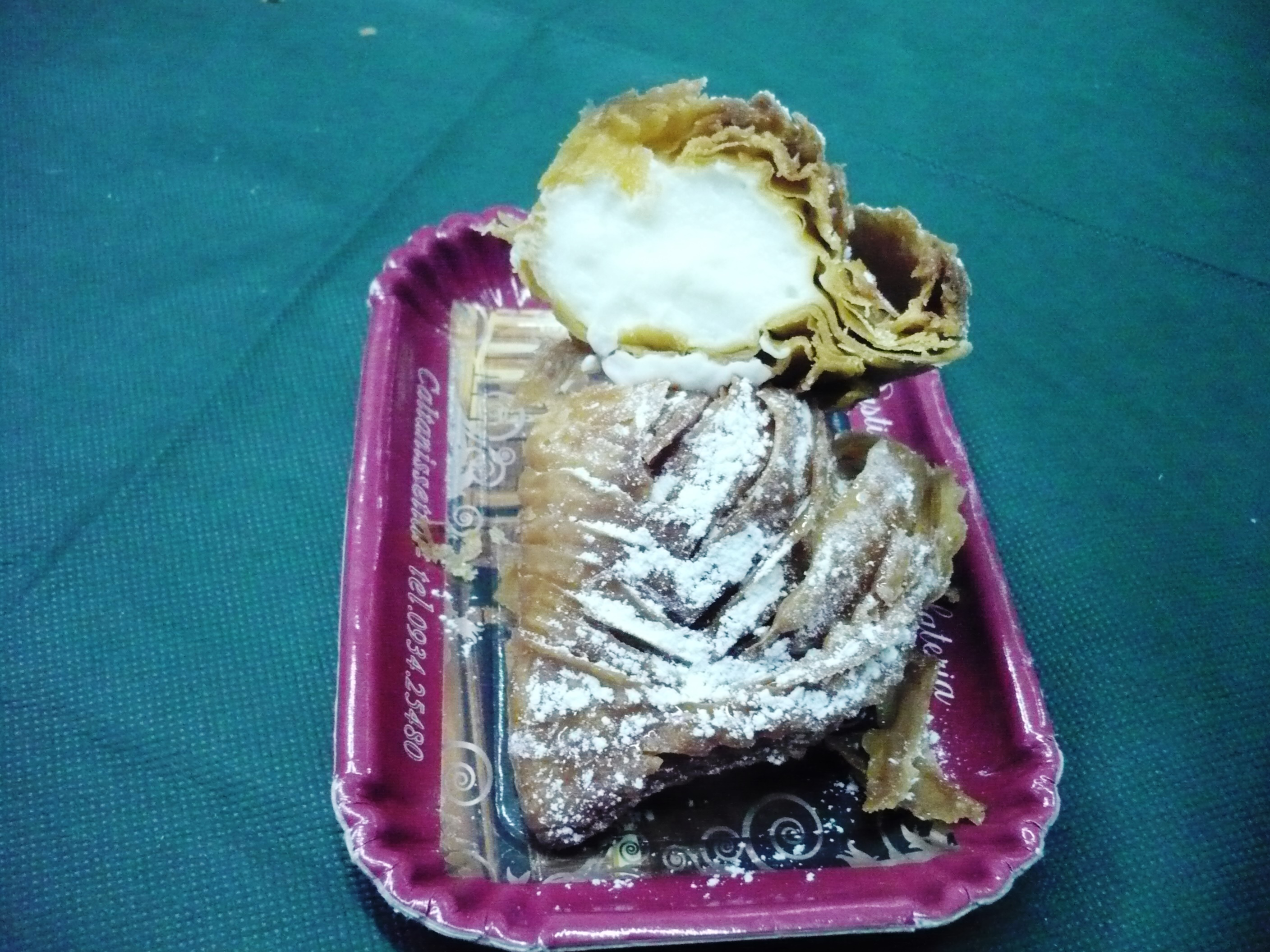
- Type: Sweet
- Place of origin: Italy
- Region or state: Caltanissetta, Sicily
- Main ingredients: Sheep's ricotta, honey

Raviola di ricotta nissena (Note: nissena is the Italian adjective for 'from Caltanissetta'.) is a dessert from the city of Caltanissetta, Sicily, prepared with puff pastry and a ricotta filling; note that it should not be confused with the fried raviola from Catania, which shares a similar shape but differs in dough composition.

Typically associated with the Nissena pastry tradition, this dessert is not often manufactured during the summer months.

== Ingredients ==
Soft wheat flour, sweetened sheep's ricotta, honey, and strictly lard as a frying fat.

The dough is rolled out and flattened on a large marble table, then brushed with lard that must not be liquid, then rolled into a roll (very similar to a Swiss roll, but with many more layers). The disks are cut from the end, shaped to form disks that are filled with plenty of ricotta and then folded to form semi-circles. The pastry is cooked until the layers separate and color (see Maillard reaction), forming the characteristic ridges of the raviola di ricotta nissena.

== See also ==
- List of Italian desserts and pastries
