= Cuccidati =

Italian fig cookie

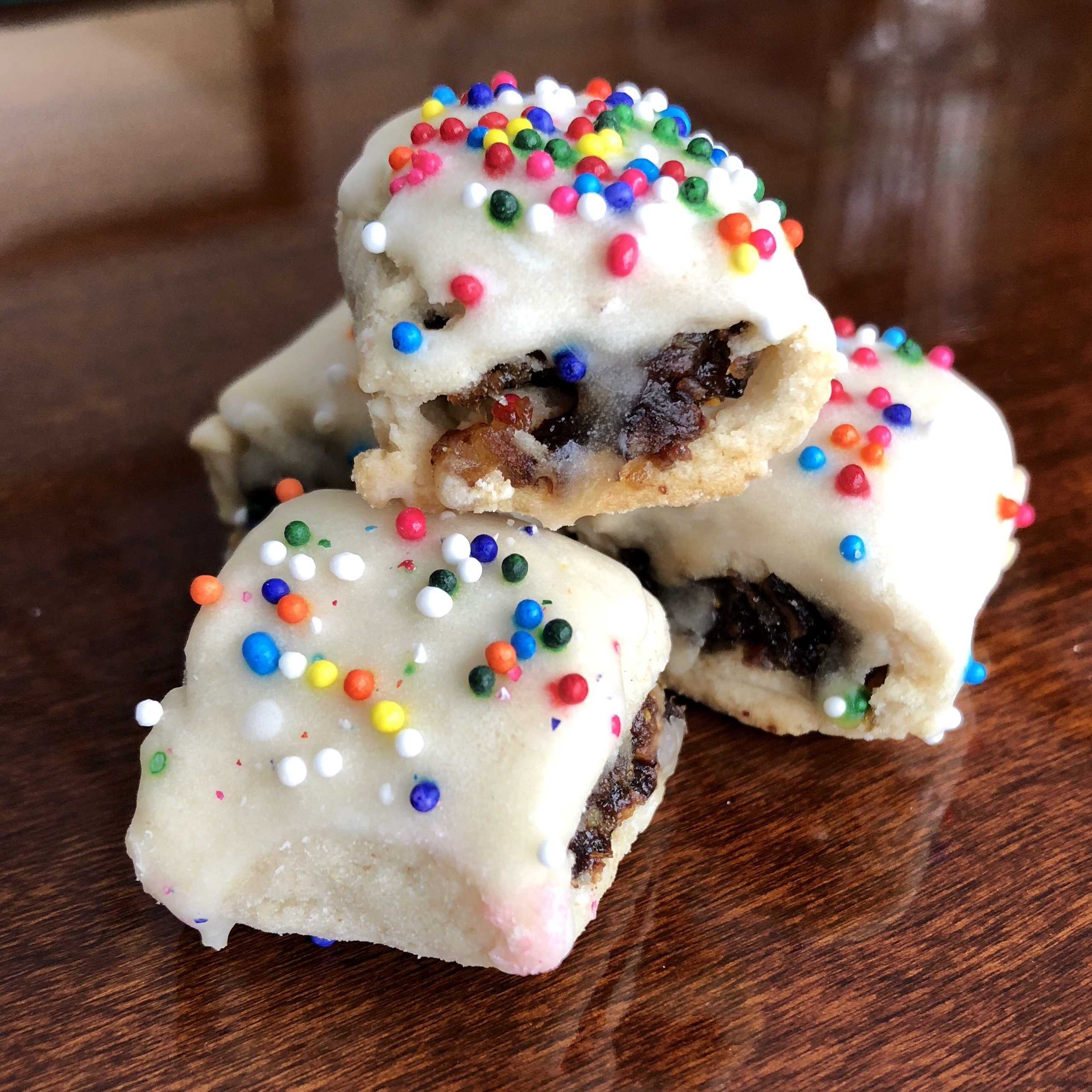
- Alternative names: Buccellati, Italian fig cookie, Sicilian fig cookie
- Type: Cookie
- Place of origin: Italy
- Region or state: Sicily
- Main ingredients: Figs

Cuccidati (also known variously as buccellati, Italian fig cookies or Sicilian fig cookies) are fig-stuffed cookies originating in the Sicily region of Italy, traditionally served at Christmas time.

The outer cookie is pastry dough, covered with icing and typically topped with rainbow sprinkles. The filling generally consists of some combination of walnuts, dates, figs, honey, spices and orange or apricot jam. The pastry is rolled around the filling, and rolls are either cut into short tubes, or curved around to form a "bracelet".

== Variations ==
When ring-shaped these may be known as buccellati, meaning 'little bracelets', and are a diminutive form of buccellato, a larger fig-filled ring cake. The ingredients are as varied as the names the cookies are called by, apparently a function of the town or region in which they are made. Other towns call them nucciddati (nut cookies), zucciddati, ucciddati, vucciddati and, as in Serradifalco, pucciddati. That town's version includes ground figs and dates, nuts, and orange rinds.

== See also ==
- List of Italian desserts and pastries
- List of stuffed dishes
- Fig roll
