= Sfincia di San Giuseppe =

Sicilian pastry dessert

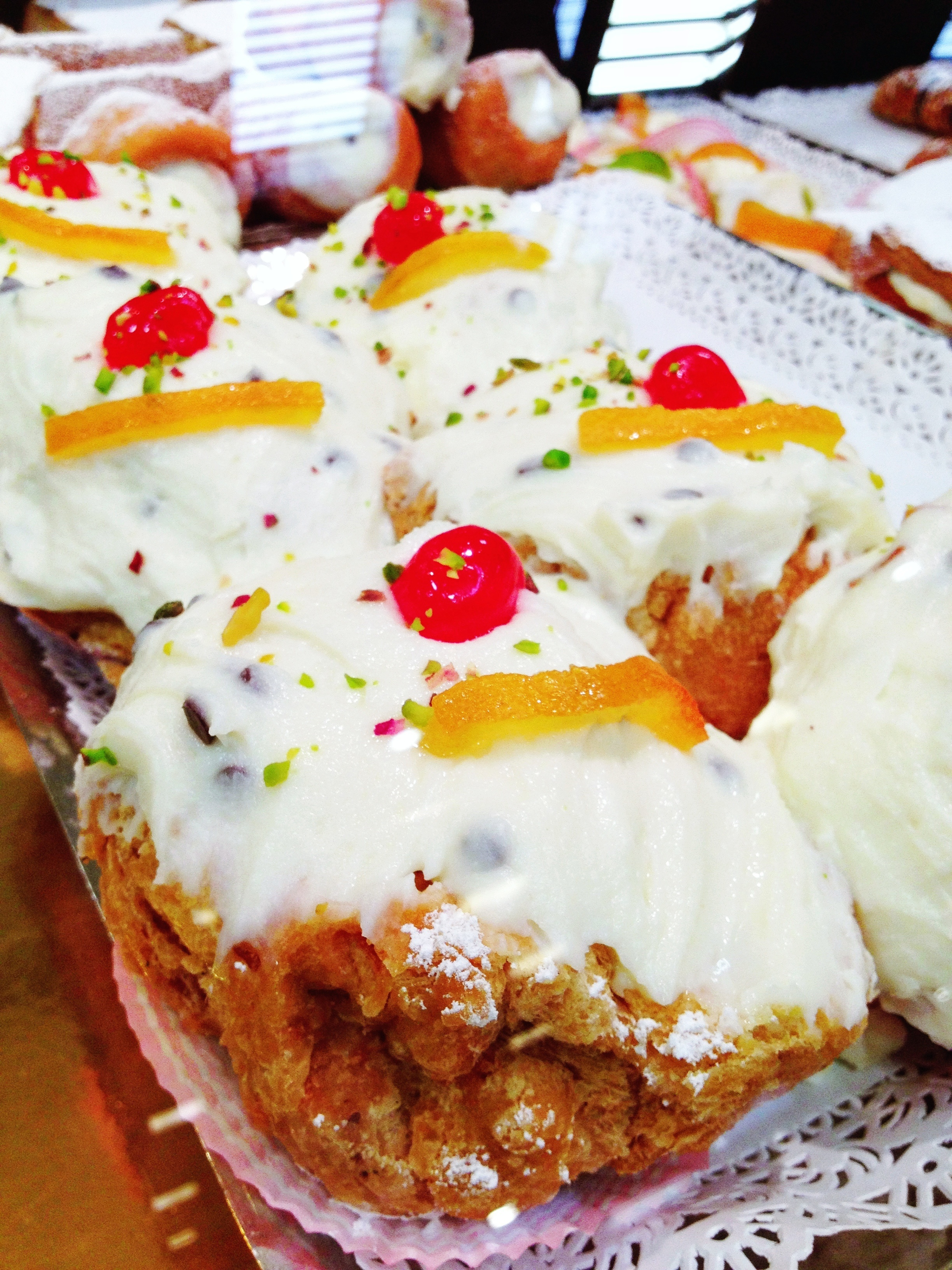
Sfince di San Giuseppe

Sfincia di San Giuseppe (also called sfincia or spincia ri San Giuseppi in Sicilian) is a Sicilian pastry dessert, traditionally prepared for the day of Saint Joseph (19 March). It is recognised as a prodotto agroalimentare tradizionale (PAT) by the Italian Ministry of Agricultural, Food and Forestry Policies.

It is a fried soft pastry covered and filled with sweet ricotta and candied fruit (usually a cherry and orange).

== Etymology ==
The Sicilian term spincia can derive from the Latin spongia and the Arabic ﺍﺴﻔﻨﺞ, isfanǧ, both literally meaning 'sponge' for the peculiar consistency and form of this fried pastry, and both are possible considering the Arabic influences on Sicilian, although it is a Romance language (so coming mainly from Latin). In Italian the singular is sfincia and the plural sfince, and in Sicilian the singular is sfincia (or spincia) and the plural sfinci.

== History ==
Sfinci were created in the current version by the Nuns of Saint Francis' Stigmata in the Sicilian city of Palermo, adapting a traditional dish of Persian and Arabic cuisine. They dedicated sfinci to Saint Joseph for the simplicity of their ingredients, and it was enriched with ricotta cheese and candied fruit from the bakers of the city.

In 1784, sfinci were the object of a political fight between tavern and pâtisserie owners of Palermo, with the second ones failing to keep a monopoly on the production of these desserts.

Sfinci are currently commonly found in bakeries and patisseries, especially in western Sicily.

== See also ==
Media related to Sfincia di San Giuseppe at Wikimedia Commons

- List of Italian desserts and pastries
- Candied fruit
