= Budino =

Italian dessert

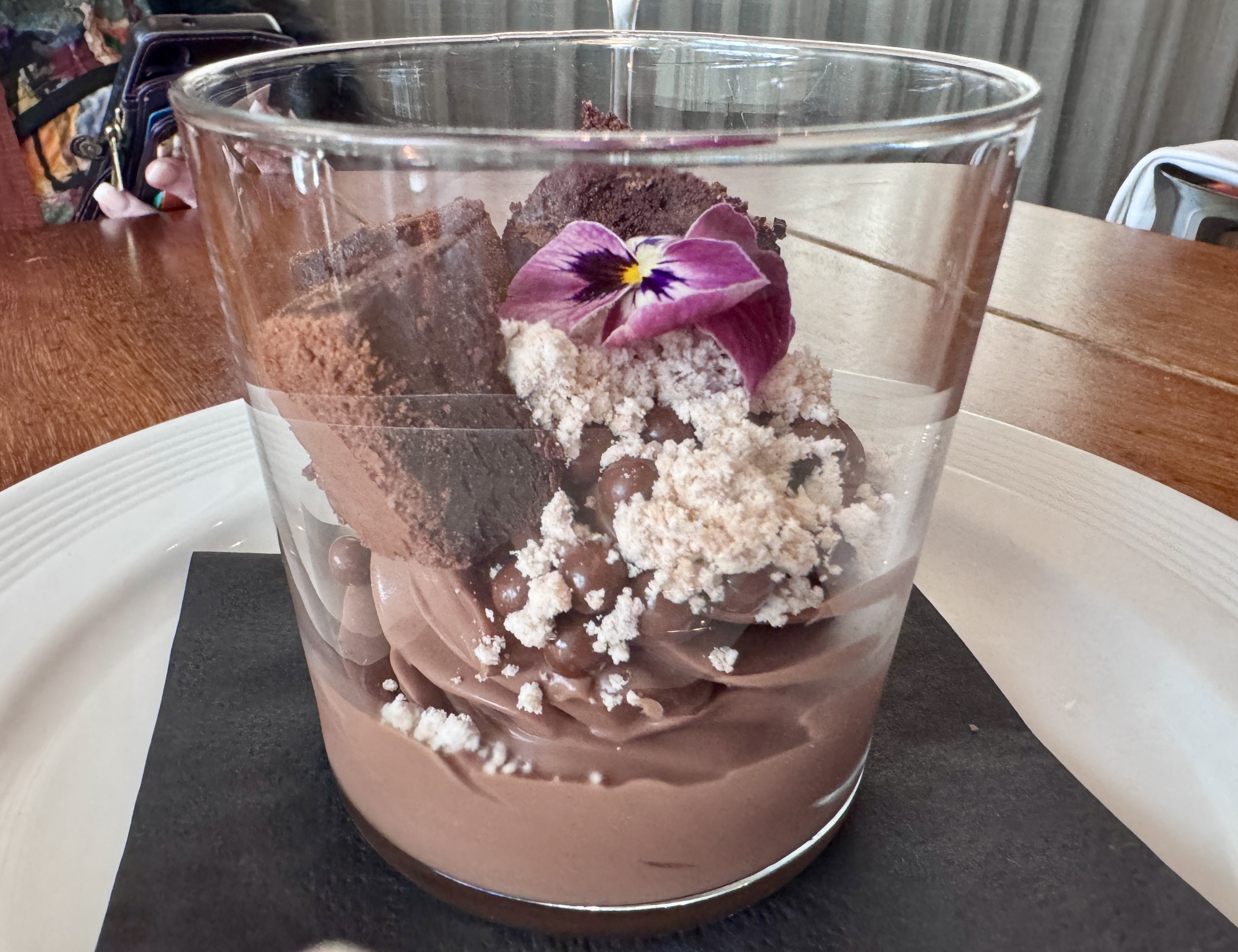
- Chocolate budino topped with brownies, powdered peanut butter, chocolate caviar and an edible flower.
- Type: Custard or pudding
- Course: Dessert
- Place of origin: Italy
- Region or state: Piemonte

Budino (lit. 'pudding') is a sweet Italian dessert, usually rich and creamy like a custard or pudding. Like the English word 'pudding', budino originally referred to a type of medieval sausage. It can be thickened with cornstarch or cookies to make it more like a soufflé or ganache, and it can be sauced with various flavors, including chocolate, caramel, apple, and butterscotch.

== See also ==
- List of Italian desserts and pastries
