= Rollò =

Italian dessert

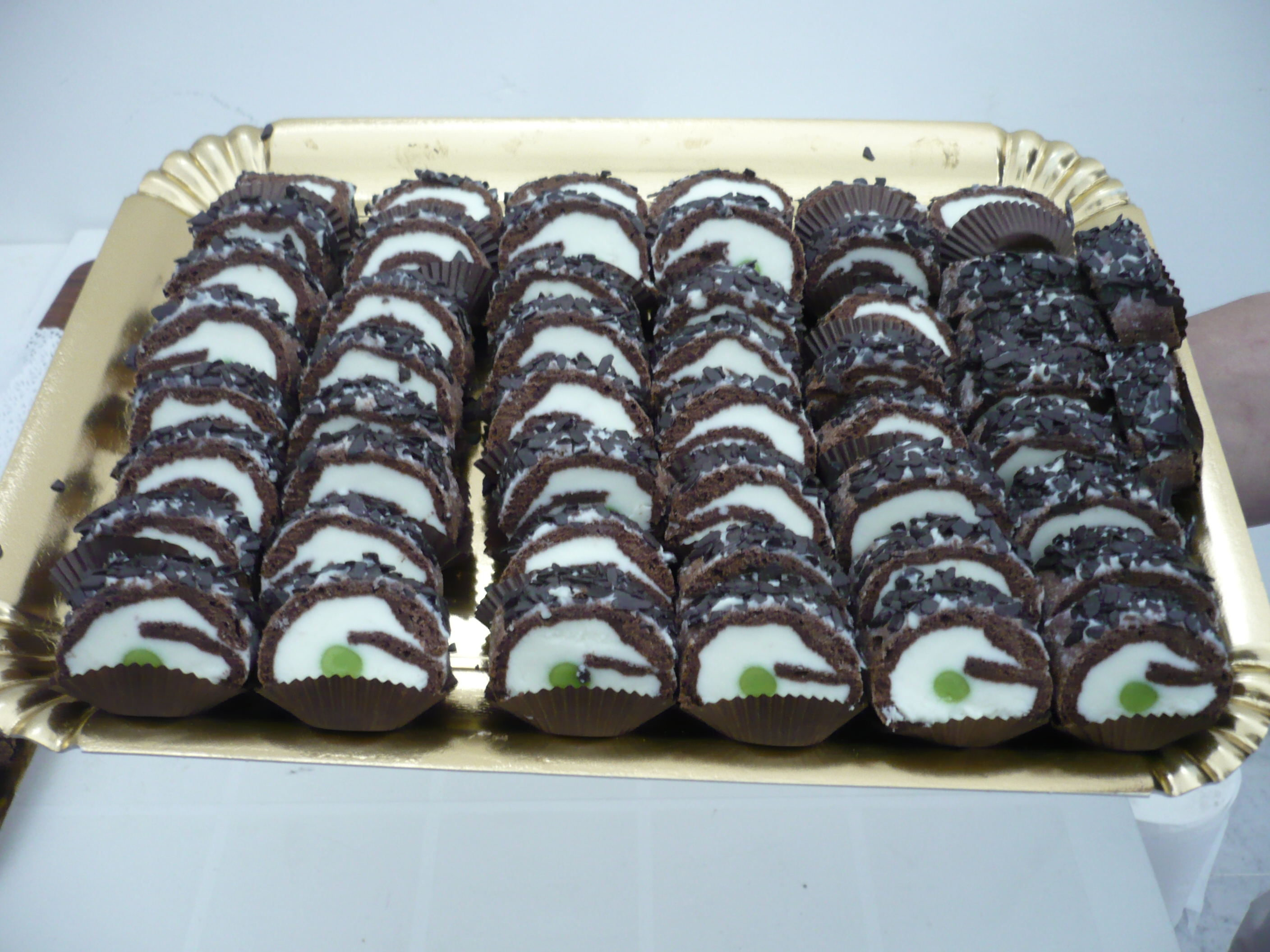
Rollò nisseno in miniature format

Rollò or rollò nisseno is a dessert from the Nisseno area, produced by local pastry chefs. It is consumed year-round, as it is not tied to any specific event or occasion.

== See also ==
Media related to Rollò at Wikimedia Commons

- List of Italian desserts and pastries
