= Torta mimosa =

Italian cake

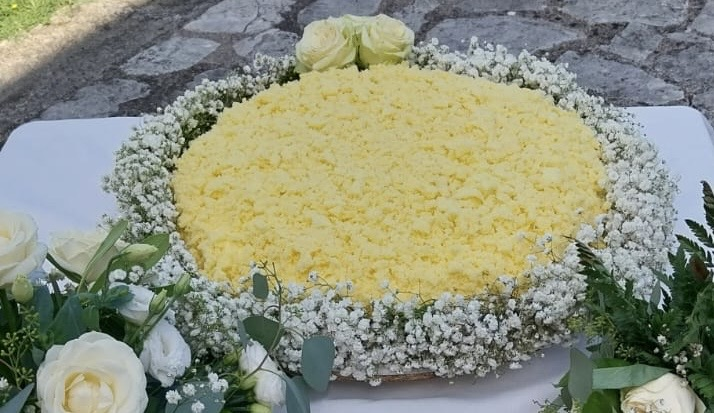
- Place of origin: Italy
- Created by: Adelmo Renzi
- Main ingredients: Sugar, eggs, flour, vanilla, custard, sponge cake, Marsala

Torta mimosa is an Italian dessert first created in the comune (municipality) of Rieti, Lazio, in the 1950s. The name is given by the small pieces of sponge cake scattered on the surface, which resemble mimosa flowers in shape. Thanks to the flower's connection with International Women's Day, the cake is also often used to celebrate this occasion.

== Origin ==
The recipe was invented by Adelmo Renzi, a chef from San Filippo, a frazione (hamlet) of Contigliano, who owned a restaurant in the centre of the comune of Rieti, Lazio. The cake became famous in May 1962, when the chef took part in a pastry competition in Sanremo, during which he presented the mimosa as a tribute to the city of flowers, and won. The original recipe used by Renzi, however, has never been revealed.

== Composition and preparation ==
The comparison of the cake with the mimosa flower is linked to its appearance. The flower atop it is formed by pieces of sponge cake shaped like a mimosa flower. The preparation requires cutting a horizontal slice of sponge cake and removing the inner part, which is then fully crumbled and used to create the "mimosa effect".

The sponge cake can be soaked in sweet liqueur, such as Marsala or Maraschino, or in pineapple juice. The filling consists of custard, with the possible addition of whipped cream or jam. Fresh fruit or canned fruit is also used.

It is possible to use a bit of turmeric to intensify the colour of the sponge crumbs to be scattered across the surface, although this is not strictly necessary.

== See also ==
- List of Italian desserts and pastries
- List of cakes
- Mimosa
