= Ossa di morto =

Italian sweet

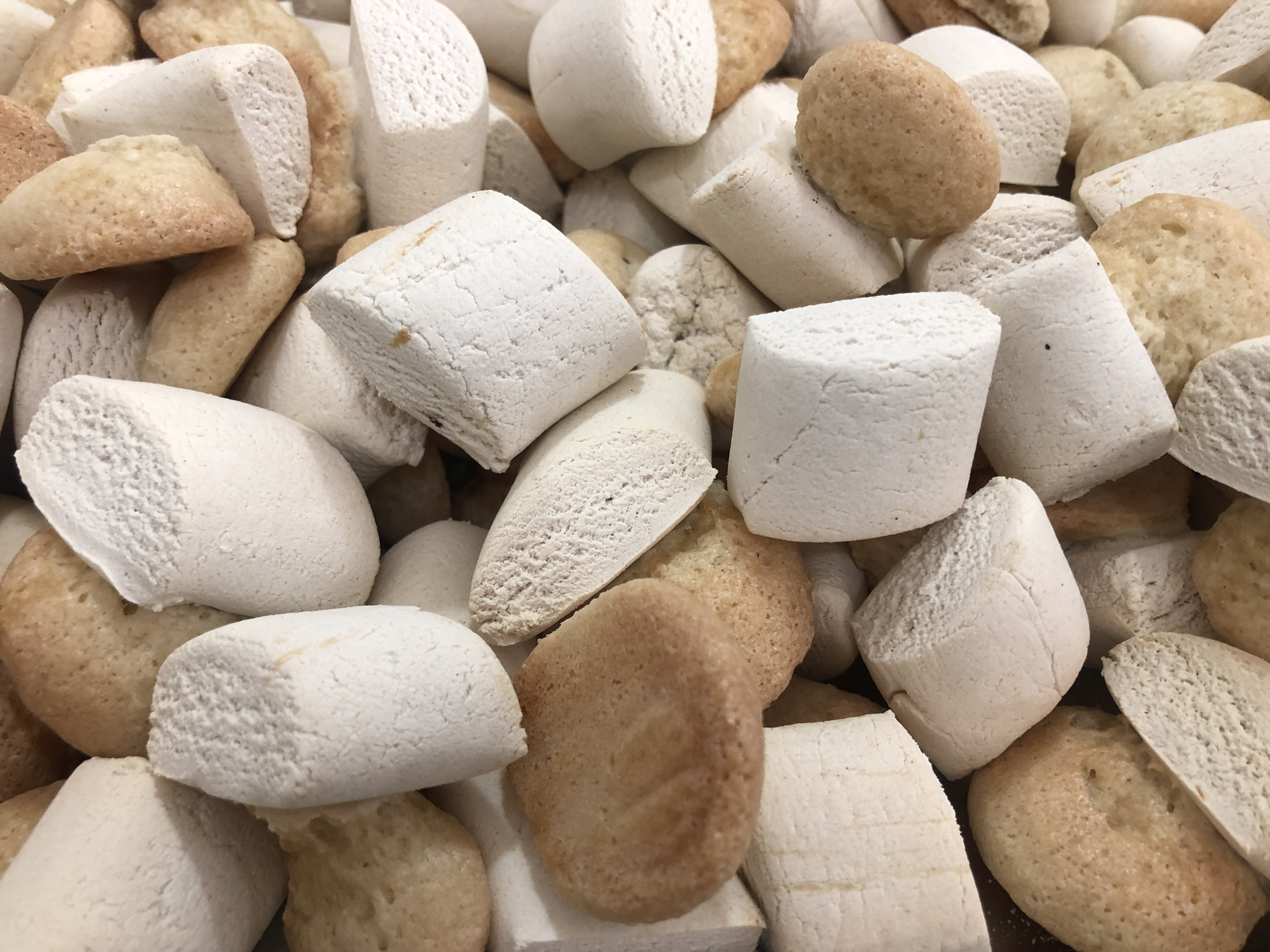
- Type: Sweet
- Place of origin: Italy
- Region or state: Sicily
- Main ingredients: Flour, sugar, cinnamon, cloves

Ossa di morto are Sicilian biscuits, included in the list of traditional Italian agri-food products (PAT) of the Ministry of Agricultural, Food and Forestry Policies.

Also known as nucatoli, mustazzoli, scardellini, scardellini, moscardini or paste di garofano, they are prepared on the occasion of the commemoration of the deceased and have the shape of small human bones.

== Preparation ==
Both parts of the biscuit are made with the same dough, based on flour, water, sugar, and spices such as cinnamon and cloves: the dough is prepared, shaped and left to rest for a few days, until the surface has dried completely. Then the biscuits are baked in the oven: the top will become white and hard, while the base, moistened, will be darker, soft, and caramelised, thanks to the sugar dripped from the top.

== See also ==
Media related to Ossa di morto at Wikimedia Commons

- List of Italian desserts and pastries
