= Bensone =

Italian dessert

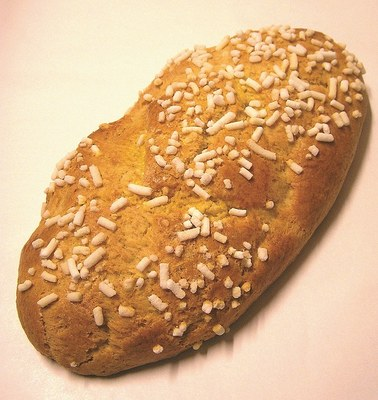
- Alternative names: Balsone, bassolano
- Place of origin: Italy
- Region or state: Emilia-Romagna

Bensone (bensòun in the Modenese dialect), also called balsone (balsòn) or bassolano (in the Mirandola dialect basulàn; in the central-southern part of the province called busilàun), is an oval-shaped dessert from Modena. It is often cut into slices and then soaked in Lambrusco wine before being eaten.

== History ==
In the 13th century the Modenese community offered it to the guild of blacksmiths and goldsmiths on the occasion of the patronal feast of these artisans. The etymology of the name may derive from the French pain de son, or bran bread, since at one time unsifted flour was used to make the cake.

The ancient recipe for bensone, which has remained almost unchanged over time, called for a dough of flour, milk, eggs, butter and honey, which was later replaced with sugar.

The bensone can be filled with 100–150 g of jam or savòr.

The same dough for the bensone was also used for another typical local dessert, ciambella, which is round in shape with a hole in the center.

== See also ==
- List of Italian desserts and pastries
