= Parrozzo =

Cake from Abruzzo, Italy

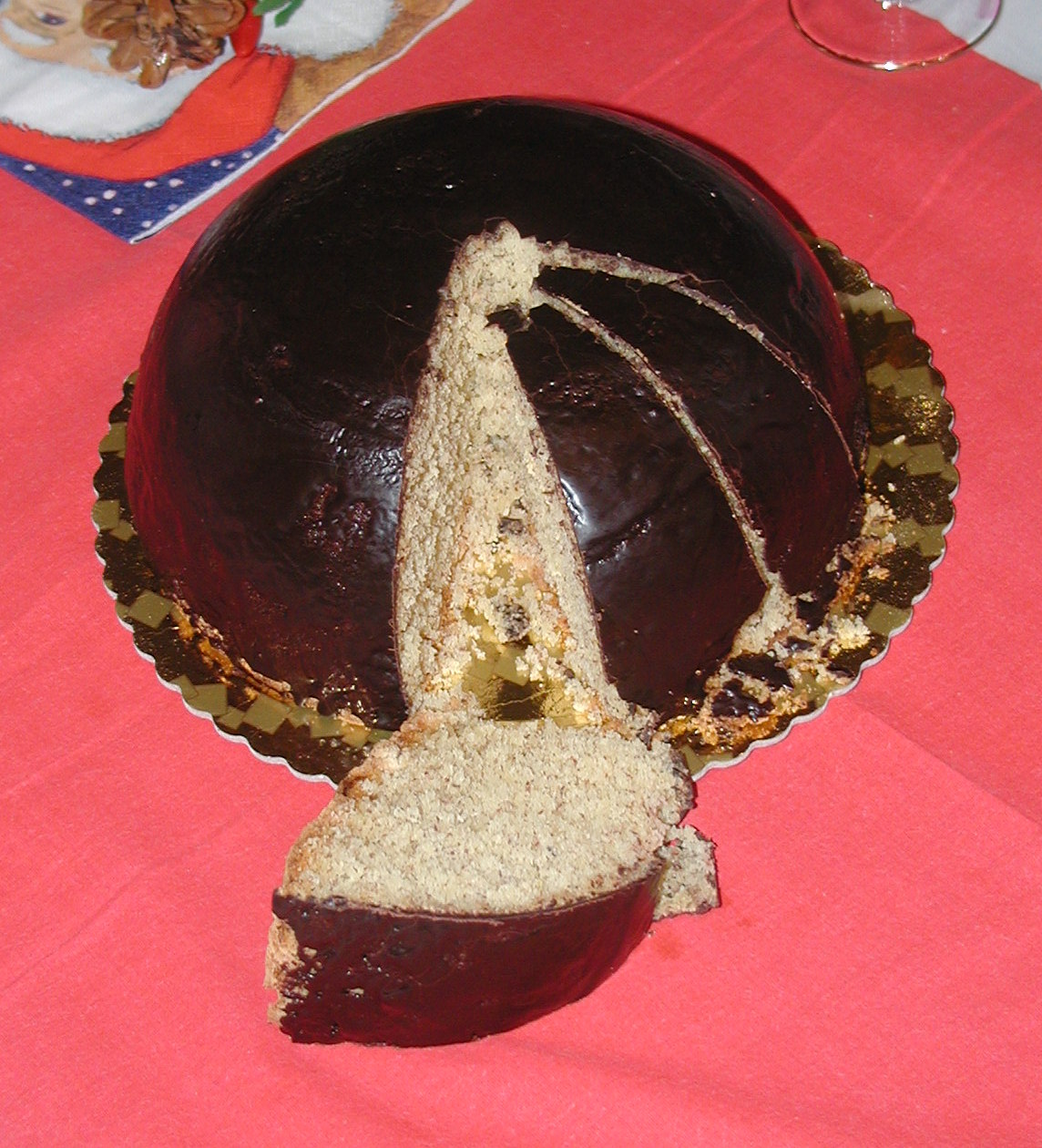
- Course: Dessert
- Place of origin: Italy
- Region or state: Abruzzo
- Main ingredients: Sugar, eggs, semolina, almonds, orange or lemon, dark chocolate

Parrozzo (Italian: [parˈrɔttso]) or panrozzo (Italian: [ˌpanˈroddzo]) is a cake from the Abruzzo region of Italy. It is traditionally served as a Christmas dessert, but may also be enjoyed year round.

Parrozzo is officially designated as a prodotto agroalimentare tradizionale (PAT) of Abruzzo.

== Origins ==
Parrozzo was invented in 1920 by Luigi D'Amico, a bakery owner in Pescara. D'Amico wanted to create a cake that resembled the traditional rough bread made by local farmers with corn flour. Parrozzo has the same round shape as the bread, contains eggs to mimic the yellow of the corn, and is covered with a layer of dark chocolate reminiscent of the burnt surface of the bread.

The first person to try parrozzo was the poet Gabriele D'Annunzio. Afterwards, he composed a madrigal called "La Canzone del Parrozzo" (lit. 'The Song of Parrozzo'), written in Abruzzese dialect:

"È tante 'bbone stu parrozze nove che pare na pazzie de San Ciattè, c'avesse messe a su gran forne tè la terre lavorata da lu bbove, la terre grasse e lustre che se coce… e che dovente a poche a poche chiù doce de qualunque cosa doce…"

== Ingredients and preparation ==
The dough of parrozzo is made of semolina (alternatively yellow or white flour with corn starch), sugar, eggs, ground almonds, almond extract, and orange or lemon zest. All ingredients are mixed and baked in a round aluminum tray. When the cake has cooled, it is removed from the tray and covered with molten dark chocolate.

== See also ==
- List of Italian desserts and pastries

== Bibliography ==
- Enrico Di Carlo, Gabriele d'Annunzio e la gastronomia abruzzese, Castelli, Verdone, 2010.
