= Torta delle rose =

Italian cake

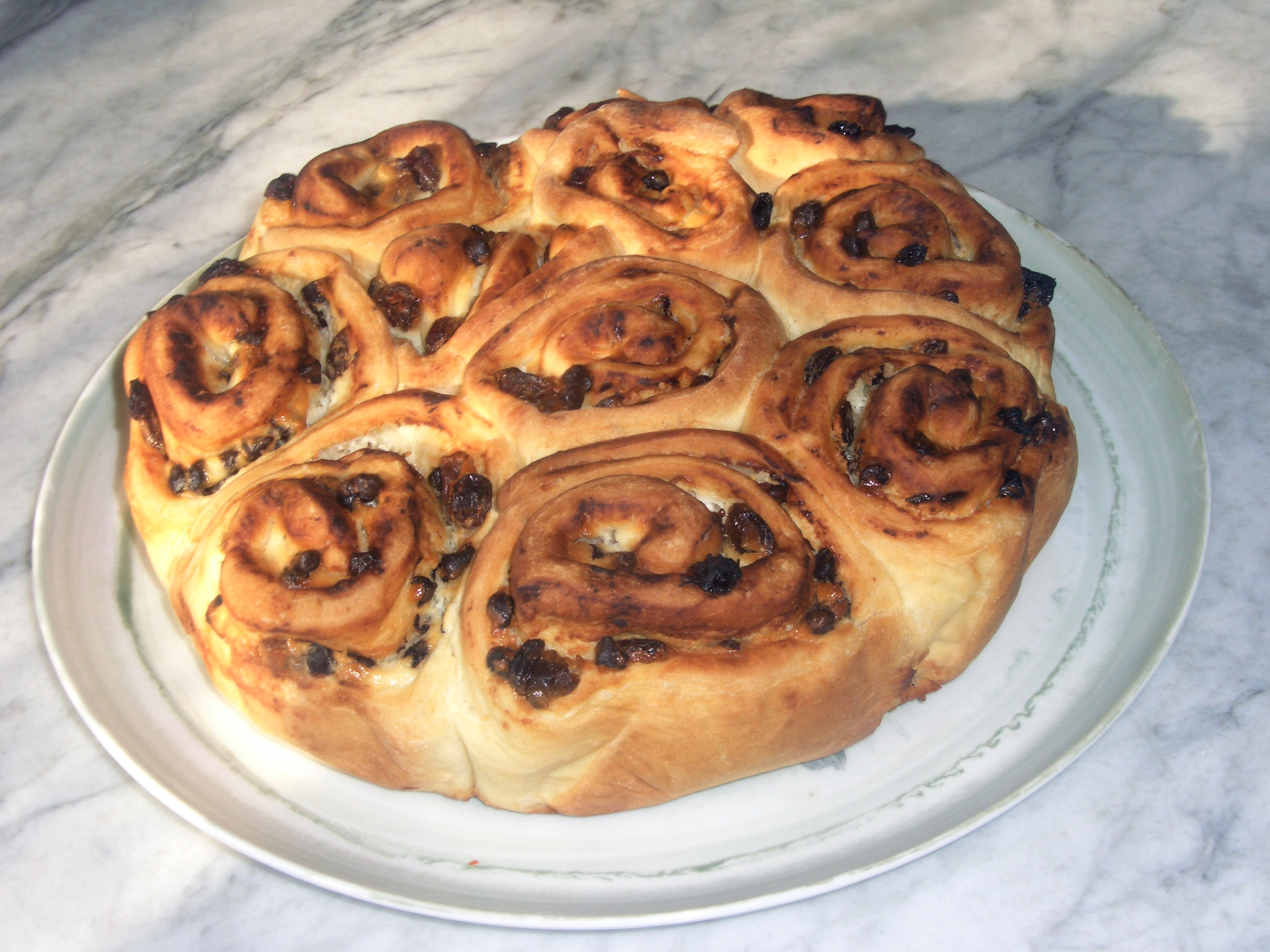
- Alternative names: Torta a rose
- Type: Cake
- Place of origin: Italy
- Region or state: Lombardy
- Main ingredients: Flour, eggs, salt, butter, milk, vanilla, honey, yeast, sugar

Torta delle rose or torta a rose (lit. 'rose cake') is a typical cake of Mantuan and Brescian cuisine. It is made with leavened dough rich in butter and sugar, which is rolled up and placed in the baking tin, taking the characteristic shape of a basket of rosebuds, hence the name.

== History ==
When Isabella d'Este became Marchioness consort of Mantua in 1490, by marrying Francesco II Gonzaga, the cuisine of Mantua was influenced by that of Emilia: the Marchioness used the advice of Cristoforo di Messisbugo, cook of the Lords of Ferrara, who seems to have created the torta delle rose especially for her.

== See also ==
- List of Italian desserts and pastries
- List of cakes
