= Torta della nonna =

Italian pastry pie

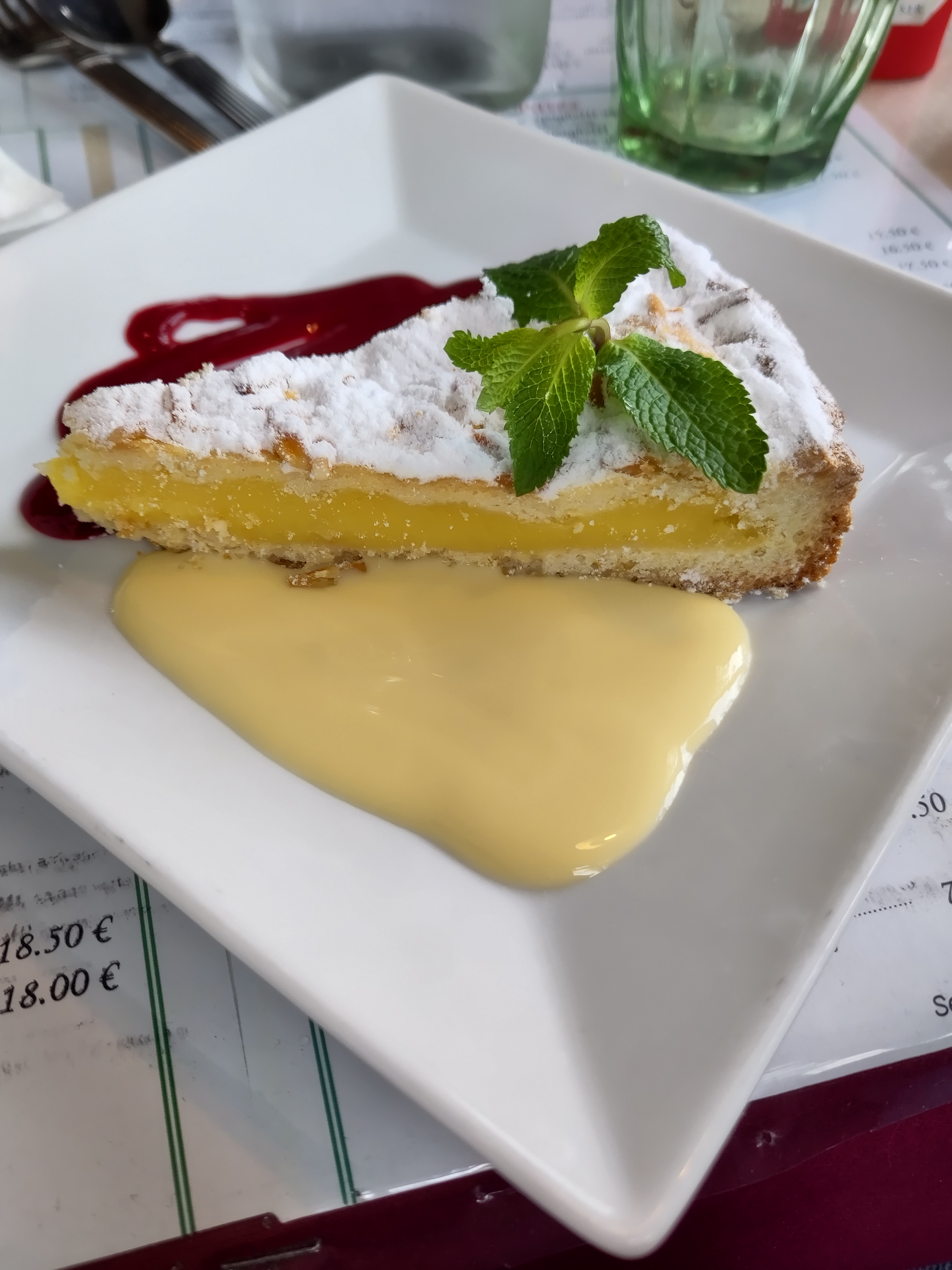
- A slice of torta della nonna
- Type: Cake
- Place of origin: Italy
- Region or state: Arezzo, Tuscany
- Main ingredients: Flour, eggs, butter, sugar, lemon zest, vanilla, milk, powdered sugar, pine nuts

Torta della nonna (lit. 'grandmother's cake') is a dessert typical of the Tuscany region of Italy.

== Description ==
Torta della nonna originated in the comune (municipality) of Arezzo, in Tuscany. It is a sweet pastry cake filled with thick Italian custard (crema pasticcera) and covered with pine nuts and confectioner's sugar. The custard filling is flavoured with vanilla and fresh lemon zest. A flat pie pan or a taller springform pan can be used to bake the cake. Torta della nonna is usually served as the last course of the classic Italian Sunday meal.

== History ==
The origin of this dessert has been debated. According to some, its true origin can be traced to the Arezzo region, while others point to a more recent Florentine origin. Some sources say that the cake was born from a bet of Guido Samorini, a Florentine cook and restaurateur. According to the most common version, some customers, tired of the few desserts that the restaurant's kitchen offered, asked him for a surprise for the following week. Samorini presented them with the torta della nonna "that was so pleasing for its taste and novelty". A passage from Pellegrino Artusi, however, casts doubt on the veracity of the story, and hints that the cake already existed in 1891; the writer describes the cake saying: "...I found the dessert with pine nuts and custard a pleasant pie, a poor pastry..."

One variation of this dessert is torta del nonno, which includes cocoa, and almonds instead of pine nuts. Other variations include the addition of cherries inside the custard filling.

== See also ==
- List of Italian desserts and pastries
- List of cakes
