= Treccia d'oro =

Italian cake

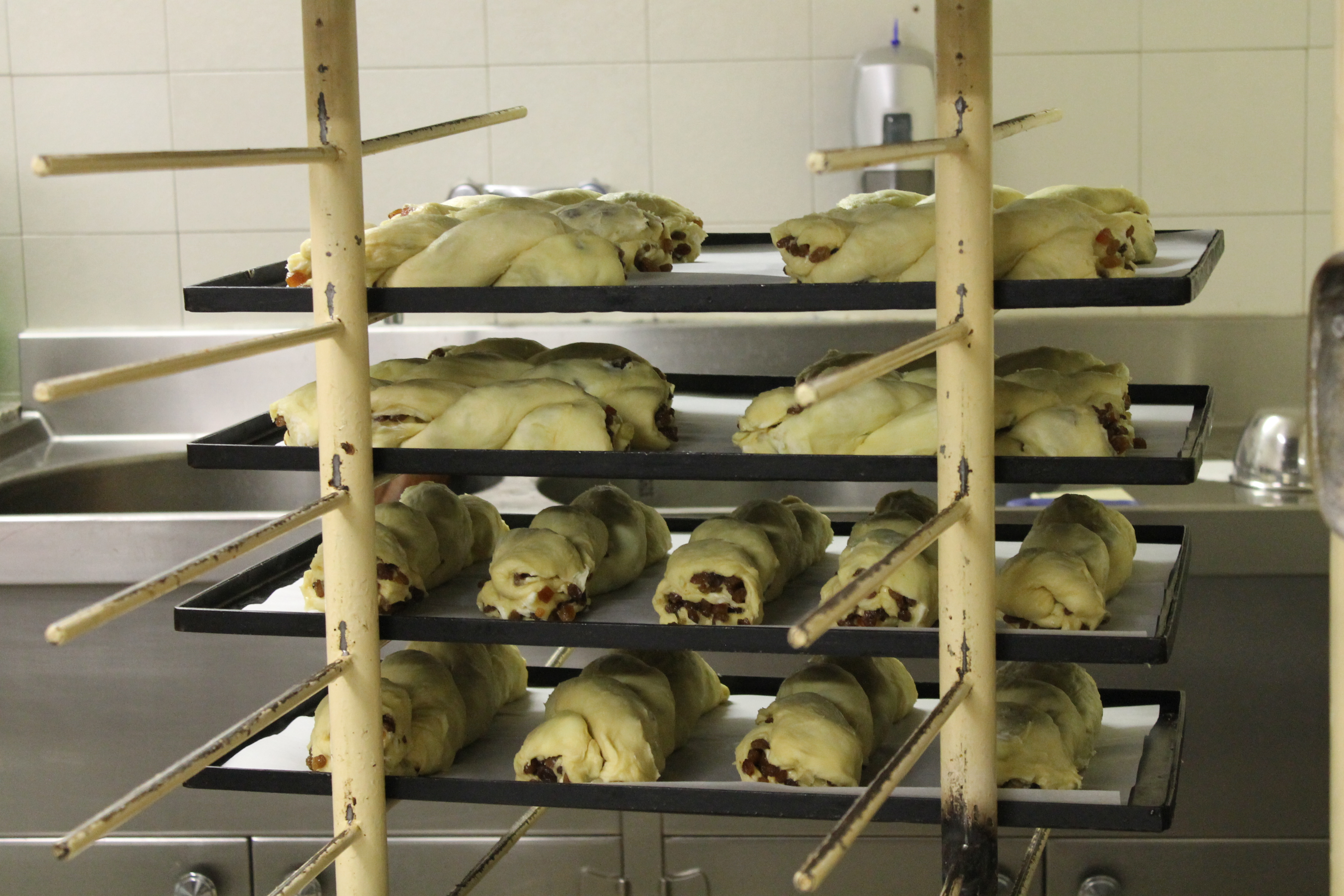
- The cake during preparation
- Type: Cake
- Place of origin: Italy
- Region or state: Crema, Lombardy
- Invented: 1937/38
- Main ingredients: Candied fruit

Treccia d'oro is a baked cake made with yeast dough and candied fruit, originating in the Italian comune (municipality) of Crema, Lombardy.

== Origin ==
Treccia d'oro was invented in the years 1937–1938 and exhibited at the "Fiera di Padova" by the pastry chef Zironda, who later patented it and opened independently the shop Pasticceria Zironda. Vittorio Maccalli started to work there as an apprentice and when the owner decided to retire, Maccalli replaced him. Later he opened a shop in Piazza Garibaldi in Crema, Lombardy, named Treccia d'Oro.

While the ingredients of the cake are known, its preparation technique (mainly how to insert the candied fruits into the dough) remains a secret.

The Lombardy region has recognised treccia d'oro as a handmade product of Crema and its surrounding area, the Cremasco.

== See also ==
Media related to Treccia d'oro at Wikimedia Commons

- List of Italian desserts and pastries
- List of cakes

== Bibliography ==
- Daniela Bianchessi e Roberta Schira, Terra piatti & piatti, Crema, Gianni Iuculano Editore, 2003.
