= Camporelli =

Light biscuit

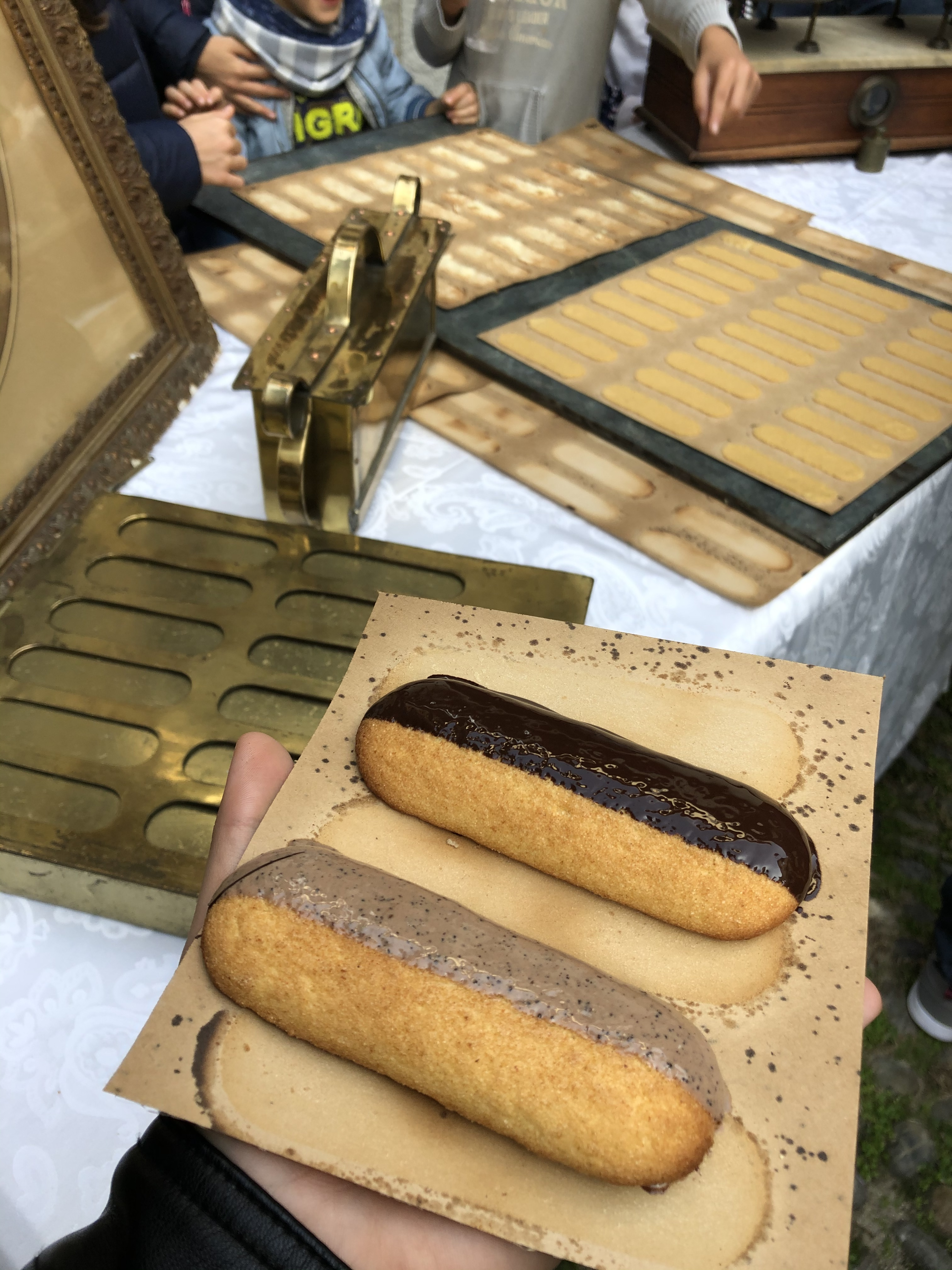
- Glazed Camporelli being prepared
- Alternative names: Biscotti Camporelli
- Course: Dessert
- Place of origin: Italy
- Region or state: Novara, Piedmont
- Main ingredients: Flour, sugar, egg

Camporelli or biscotti Camporelli is a light biscuit made with flour, sugar, and eggs. It is baked twice and characterised by its round, long shape, crispy edges, and golden colour, as well as the lack of fat, such as butter. They are used in various tiramisu recipes, served with ice cream or eaten alone.

== History ==
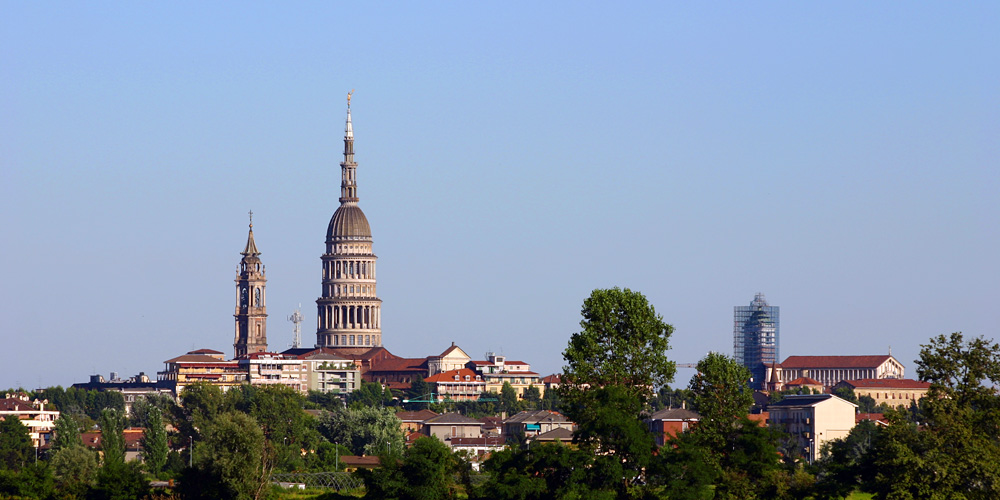
City of Novara

The predecessor of biscotti Camporelli was the biscottini di Novara, created by the nuns of the area and given to the clergy as gifts. Biscotti Camporelli was developed by Luigi Camporelli in Novara in 1852, resuming the previous tradition and commercialising it, selling it in the family bakery.

== See also ==
- List of Italian desserts and pastries
- Ladyfingers (biscuits)
- Biscotti
- Biscuit
