= Torta monferrina =

Italian cake

- Type: Cake
- Place of origin: Italy
- Region or state: Montferrat, Piedmont
- Main ingredients: Pumpkin or apples, sugar, amaretti, chocolate, eggs, rum

Torta monferrina is a cake made with pumpkin or apples, sugar, amaretti, chocolate, eggs and rum, and baked. It is an autumn speciality of the Montferrat hills, in northwest Italy.

== See also ==
- List of Italian desserts and pastries
- List of cakes
