= Giurgiulena =

Italian sesame dessert

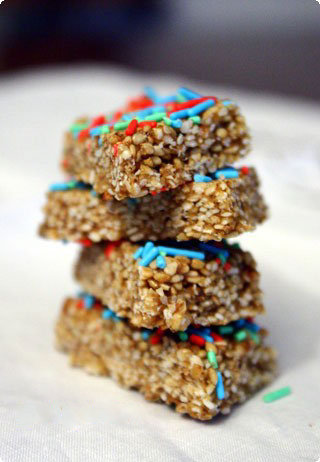
Giurgiulena

The giurgiulena, also known as giuggiulena, cubaita or cumpittu, is a traditional Christmas nougat-like candy, typical of the Sicilian cuisine and in use in a large part of Calabria.

The main ingredient is sesame, which in Sicily and in Calabria is precisely indicated by the terms giuggiulena, gigiolena, giuggiulea or ciciulena. The recipe is based on the composition of sesame seeds poured in honey and fixed by the caramelization of sugar (in an enriched version almonds and candied orange peel are also added), in the way of nougat.

It takes very long to prepare, with a rest period of twenty-four hours. The giurgiulena is usually cut into diamonds or rectangles, sometimes sprinkled with colorful sprinkles and individually wrapped, sometimes above aromatic orange leaves. As with many other Sicilian and Calabrian pastries, giuggiulena is considered a legacy of the Arab pastry. The name derives from the Arabic word juljulàn (or giolgiolan), which means 'sesame'. The alternative name cubaita derives instead from the Arabic term qubayt (also spelled qubait and qubbayt), which means 'preserved sweet'.

== See also ==
- Sicilian cuisine
- List of Italian desserts and pastries
