= Pistiddu =

Sweet pastry from Nuoro, Italy

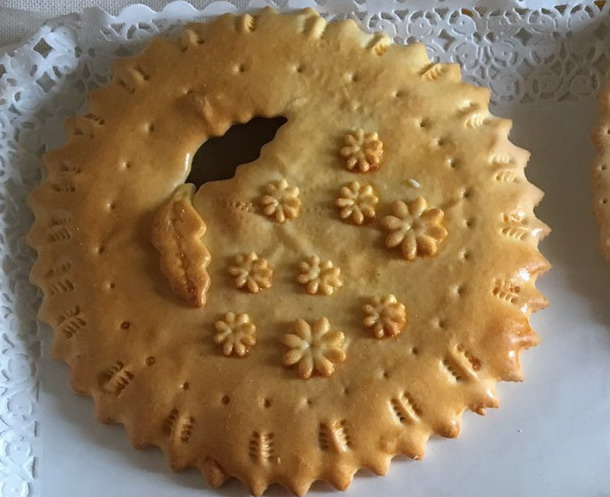
- Region or state: Sardegna

Pistiddu is a typical sweet pastry from the Nuoro region of Italy. It was originally prepared during the feast of St. Anthony Abbot. Nowadays it is often prepared on other days of celebration.

It consists of a sort of round and flat tart of straw yellow color, filled with a preparation of vincotto, orange peels and other characteristic aromas, according to the place of production and the recipe.

The recipe undergoes variations according to the country of production, for example, in Orotelli one variant adds honey, while an Orani variant includes prickly pear jam. In Orosei, the pastry can take on a thicker, wider and squarer shape, made to be divided into portions to be distributed during ceremonies and bonfires of the feast.

== Preparation ==
The preparation of the pastry is done according to the typical Nuoro tradition of decorating the dough with incised drawings through which it is possible to glimpse the filling. The taste of the pastry depends on its filling.
