= Biscotti di San Martino =

Italian sweet

Biscotto di San Martino
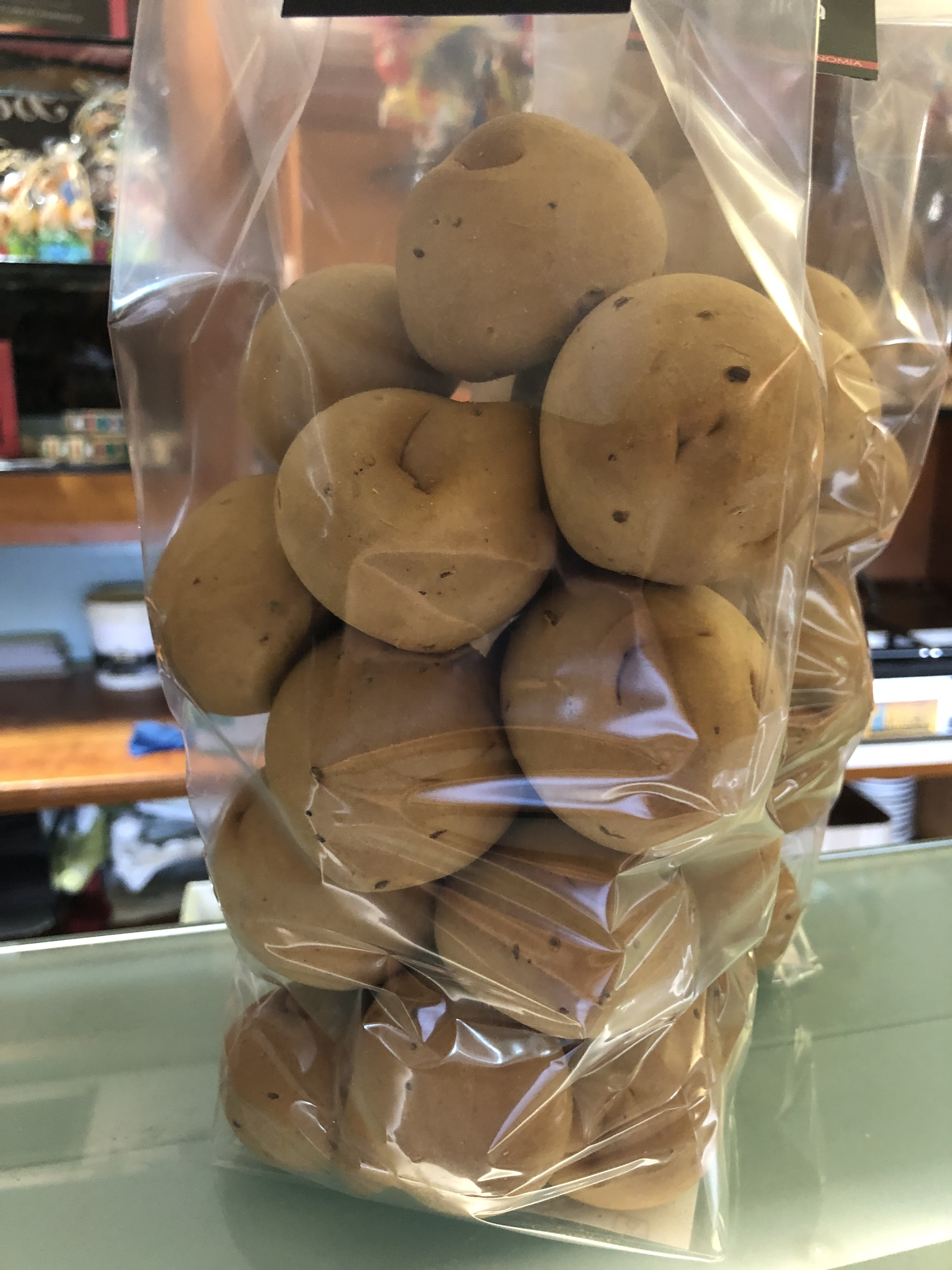
- Hard version with anise
- Type: sweet
- Place of origin: Italy
- Region or state: Sicily
- Main ingredients: Anise in hard version, sesame in soft version

Biscotto di San Martino are traditional Sicilian biscuits, which are prepared for the feast of San Martino di Tours on November 11.

== Variants ==
The biscuits are prepared in a hard version and a soft version.

The hard version consists of a dry biscuit, flavored with anise seeds, which is called tricotto because it is baked three times; traditionally, this type of biscuit is enjoyed soaked in wine.
