= Crocetta di Caltanissetta =

Italian sweet pastry

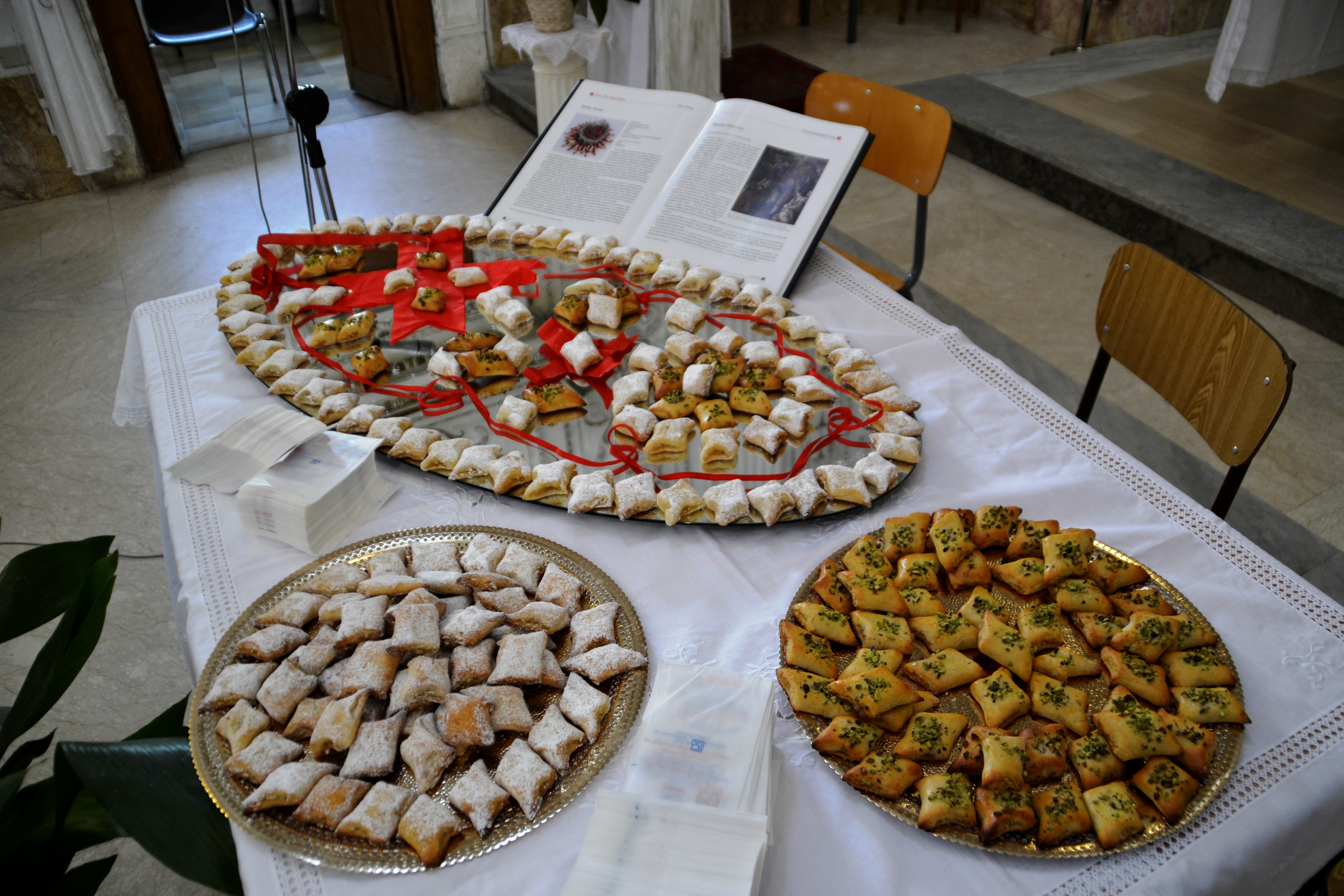
- Crocette di Caltanissetta, of lemon and orange, left to right
- Type: Dessert
- Place of origin: Italy
- Region or state: Caltanissetta, Sicily

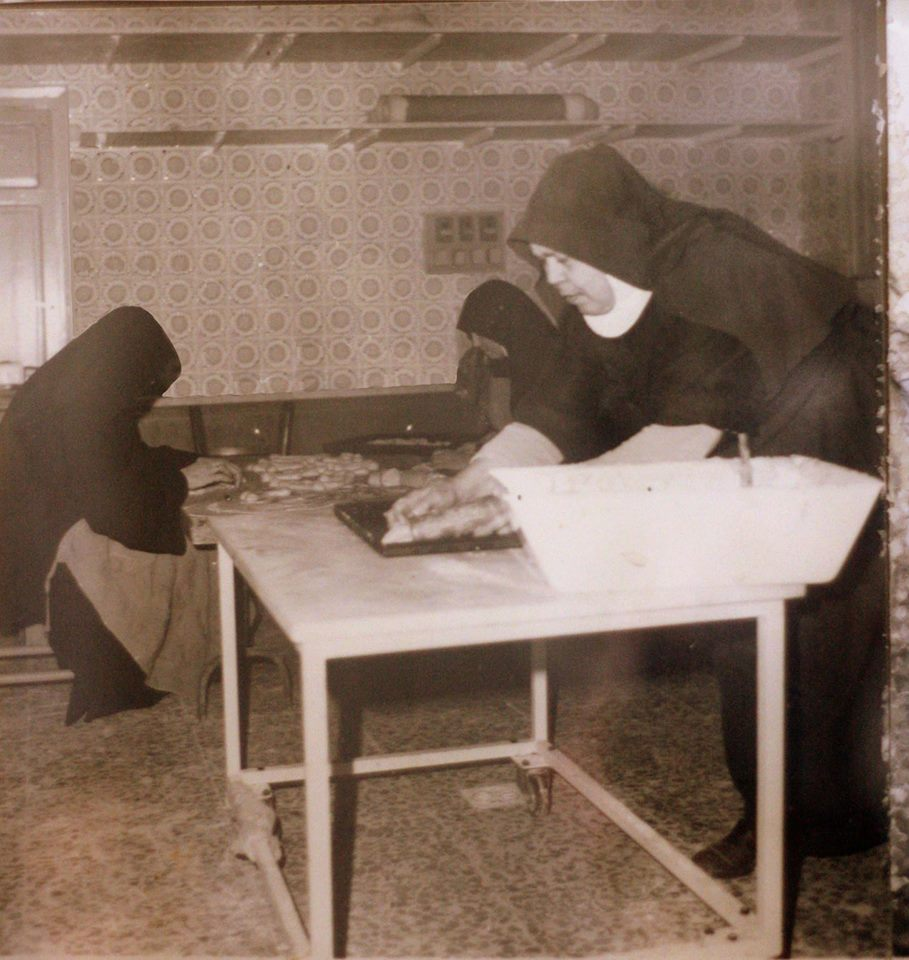
Benedictine Sisters of Caltanissetta producing the crocette

The crocetta di Caltanissetta is a traditional Italian sweet dessert that was produced in the comune (municipality) of Caltanissetta, Sicily, until the end of 1908, then forgotten about, and which has recently been rediscovered. The crocetta di Caltanissetta and the spina sacra (lit. 'sacred thorn') are made with a Marzipan dough that were traditionally prepared for the feast of the Most Holy Crucifix by the Sisters of the Benedictine Monastery. This monastery was located next to the Church of Santa Croce ('Holy Cross'), from which these sweet pastries take their name.

The chef who rediscovered them (plus four women from the Santa Croce district) are the only ones who know the recipe for these desserts. The rediscovery was possible after 20 years of research, that began with a person living in the neighbourhood who remembered how the traditional recipe was passed from mother to daughter over time.

== Ingredients ==
The ingredients of the crocetta di Caltanissetta are typical of the Caltanissetta area at the beginning of the last century. They are almonds, sugar, sweet lemon purée, oranges or other fruit typical of the area, pistachio and icing sugar.

== See also ==
- List of Italian desserts and pastries
