= Iris (pastry) =

Italian ricotta-filled pastry

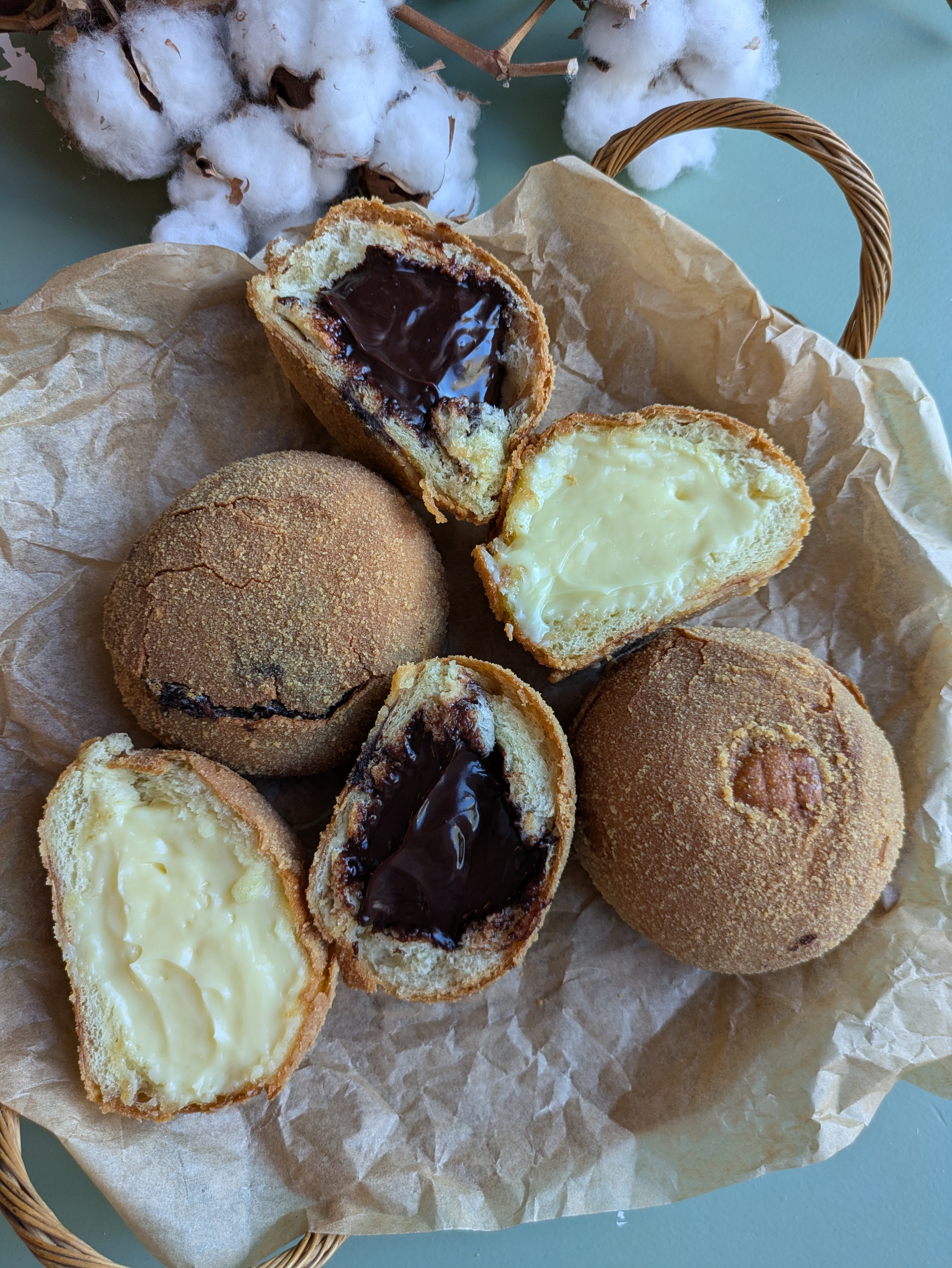
- Iris filled with ricotta and chocolate
- Type: Pastry
- Place of origin: Italy
- Region or state: Sicily
- Main ingredients: Fried pastry dough, ricotta filling

Iris is a Sicilian pastry consisting of a brioscia that is filled with a sweet and creamy filling containing ricotta cheese, coated with breadcrumbs and deep fried.

== History ==
Antonio Lo Verso, a pastry chef from Palermo, prepared this dessert in his café in 1901, on the occasion of the opera Iris by Pietro Mascagni. His creation became so famous that it induced Lo Verso to change the name of his café to Iris. From that moment on, the Iris pastry shop became a point of reference for all the aristocracy and the bourgeoisie of Palermo who ate it for their breakfasts with coffee.
