= Pane coi santi =

Traditional Italian fruit bread

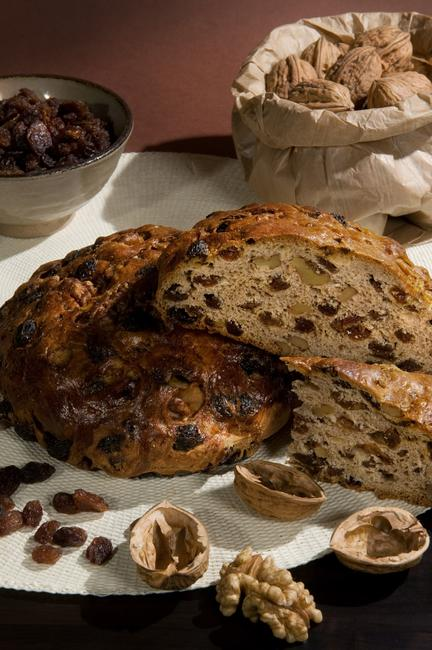
- Alternative names: pan coi santi; pan co' santi; pan dei santi
- Type: fruit bread
- Place of origin: Italy
- Region or state: Siena; Maremma
- Main ingredients: bread dough, olive oil, raisins, walnuts
- Variations: figs, dates, almonds, honey, pine kernels

Pane coi santi is a traditional Italian fruit bread. It is baked in a wood-fired oven and is eaten at about the time of I Santi on 1 November and I Morti on the following day. It is a speciality of Siena and the Maremma, and is among the products of Tuscany with prodotto agroalimentare tradizionale status.

== History ==
Pane coi santi is a traditional Italian regional product, strongly associated both with the city of Siena and with the feast of I Santi on 1 November and I Morti on the following day. George Gissing wrote in his diary for 1 November 1897: "At Siena (and here only) they eat to-day a kind of very plain plum-cake called Pane coi santi".

== Preparation ==
The traditional ingredients are flour, olive oil, raisins and walnuts. Other ingredients may include almonds, pine kernels, honey, figs and dates.

The flour is used to make a leavened bread dough, into which the other ingredients are then mixed. It is then formed into a low round or oval loaf and baked in a wood-fired oven. The result is fragrant, of a moderately dark brown, and fairly soft.
