= Piedmontese cuisine =

Cuisine of the Piedmont region

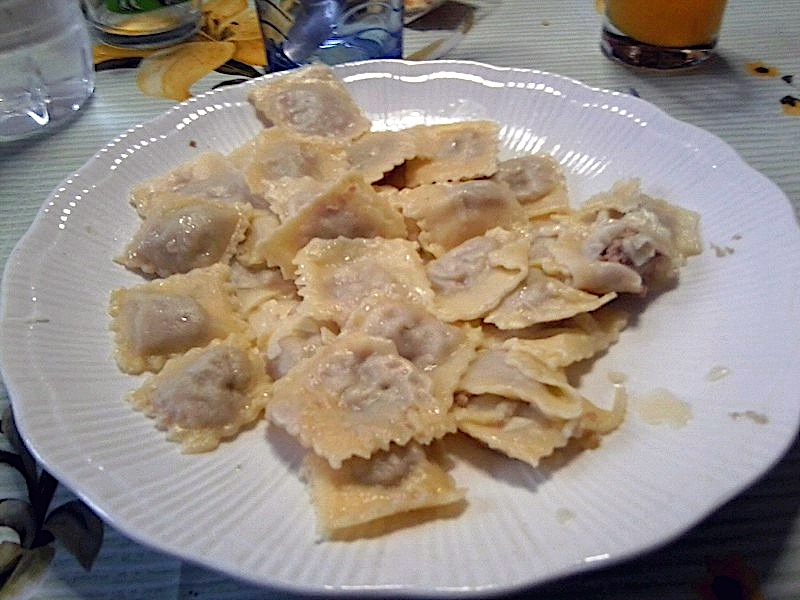
Agnolotti

Piedmontese cuisine is the style of cooking in the Piedmont region, which borders France and Switzerland. Piedmontese cuisine is partly influenced by French cuisine, as demonstrated by the importance of appetizers, a set of courses that precede what is traditionally called a first course and are aimed at whetting the appetite. In France these courses are fewer and are called entrées.

It is the region in Italy with the largest number of cheeses and wines. The most prestigious Italian culinary school, the University of Gastronomic Sciences, was founded in Piedmont. Similar to other Northern Italian cuisines, veal, wine, and butter are among the main ingredients used in cooking.

Some well-known dishes include agnolotti, vitello tonnato (also popular in Argentina), and bagna càuda. Piedmont is also credited for the well-known pasta dish tagliolini (tajarin in Piedmontese). Tagliolini are a type of egg pasta normally made fresh by hand. According to Italian writer and journalist Massimo Alberini, tagliolini was among King Victor Emmanuel II's preferred dishes.

Common in the Verbano-Cusio-Ossola area is bruscitti, originating from Alto Milanese, a dish of braised meat cut very thin and cooked in wine and fennel seeds, historically obtained by stripping leftover meat.

The Slow Food Movement was started in Piedmont by Carlo Petrini who was from the town of Bra, Piedmont. The movement greatly benefited the region by highlighting Piedmont's diverse cuisine. The Slow Food Movement offices are still headquartered in the town of Bra.

The town of Alba is known for its gourmet food and Alba white truffles.

== Overview ==
Between the Alps and the Po Valley, featuring a large number of different ecosystems, the Piedmont region offers a refined and varied cuisine. As a point of union between traditional Italian and French cuisine, Piedmont is the Italian region with the largest number of cheeses with protected geographical status and wines under DOC. It is also the region where both the Slow Food association and the most prestigious school of Italian cooking, the University of Gastronomic Sciences, were founded.

Piedmont is a region where gathering nuts, mushrooms, and cardoons, as well as hunting and fishing, are commonplace. Truffles, garlic, seasonal vegetables, cheese, and rice feature in the cuisine. Wines from the Nebbiolo grape such as Barolo and Barbaresco are produced as well as wines from the Barbera grape, fine sparkling wines, and the sweet, lightly sparkling, Moscato d'Asti. The region is also famous for its Vermouth and Ratafia production.

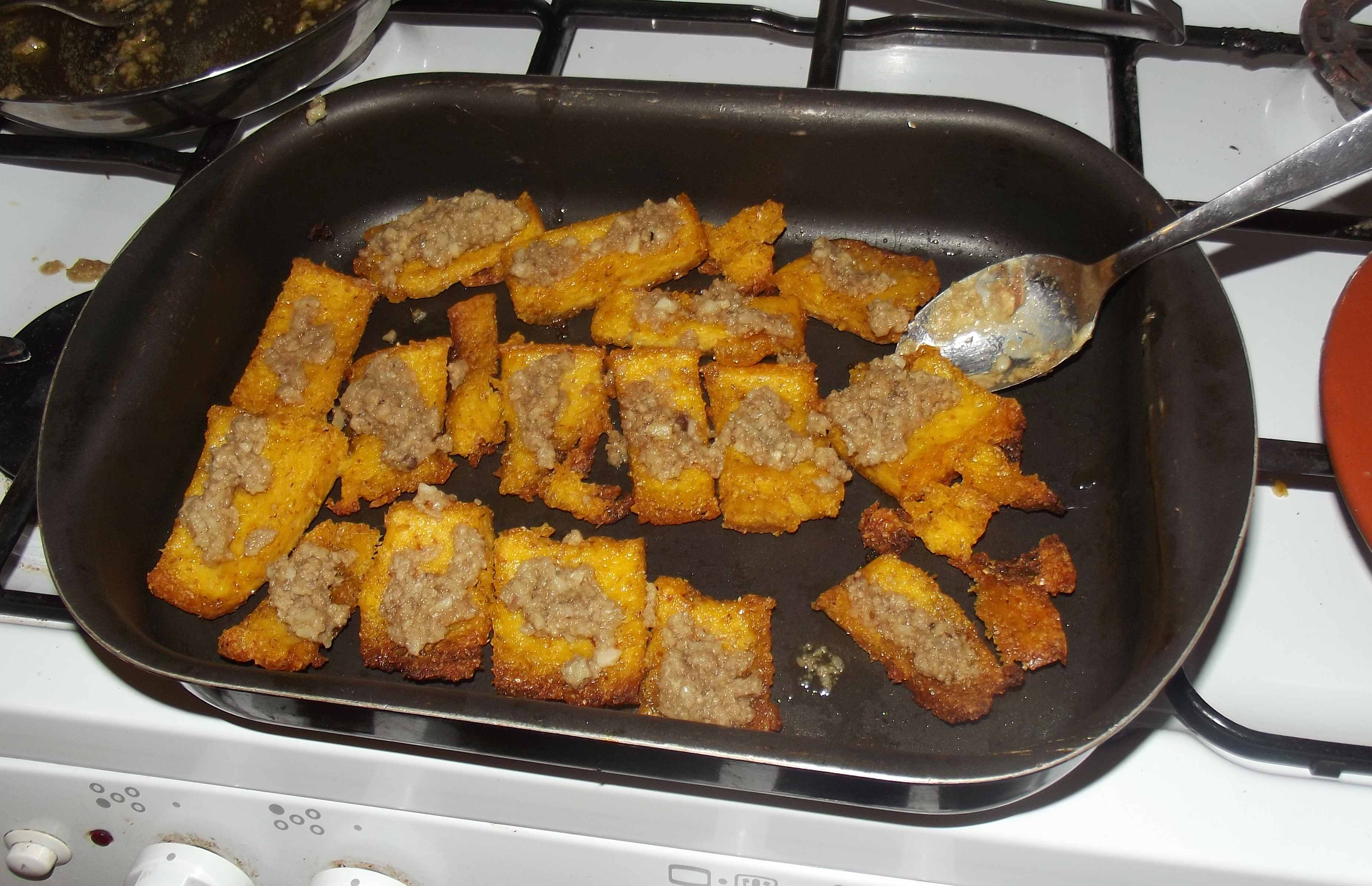
Polenta with bagna càuda

Castelmagno is a prized cheese of the region. Piedmont is also famous for the quality of its Carrù beef (particularly bue grasso, lit. 'fat ox'), hence the tradition of eating raw meat seasoned with garlic oil, lemon, and salt; carpaccio; brasato al vino, wine stew made from marinated beef; and boiled beef served with various sauces.

The food most typical of the Piedmont tradition are agnolotti (pasta folded over with roast beef and vegetable stuffing), paniscia (a typical dish of Novara, a type of risotto with Arborio rice or Maratelli rice, the typical kind of Saluggia beans, onion, Barbera wine, lard, salami, season vegetables, salt, and pepper), taglierini (thinner version of tagliatelle), bagna càuda (sauce of garlic, anchovies, olive oil, and butter), and bicerin (hot drink made of coffee, chocolate, and whole milk). Piedmont is one of the Italian capitals of pastry and chocolate in particular, with products such as Nutella, gianduiotto, and marron glacé that are famous worldwide.

== Products and dishes ==
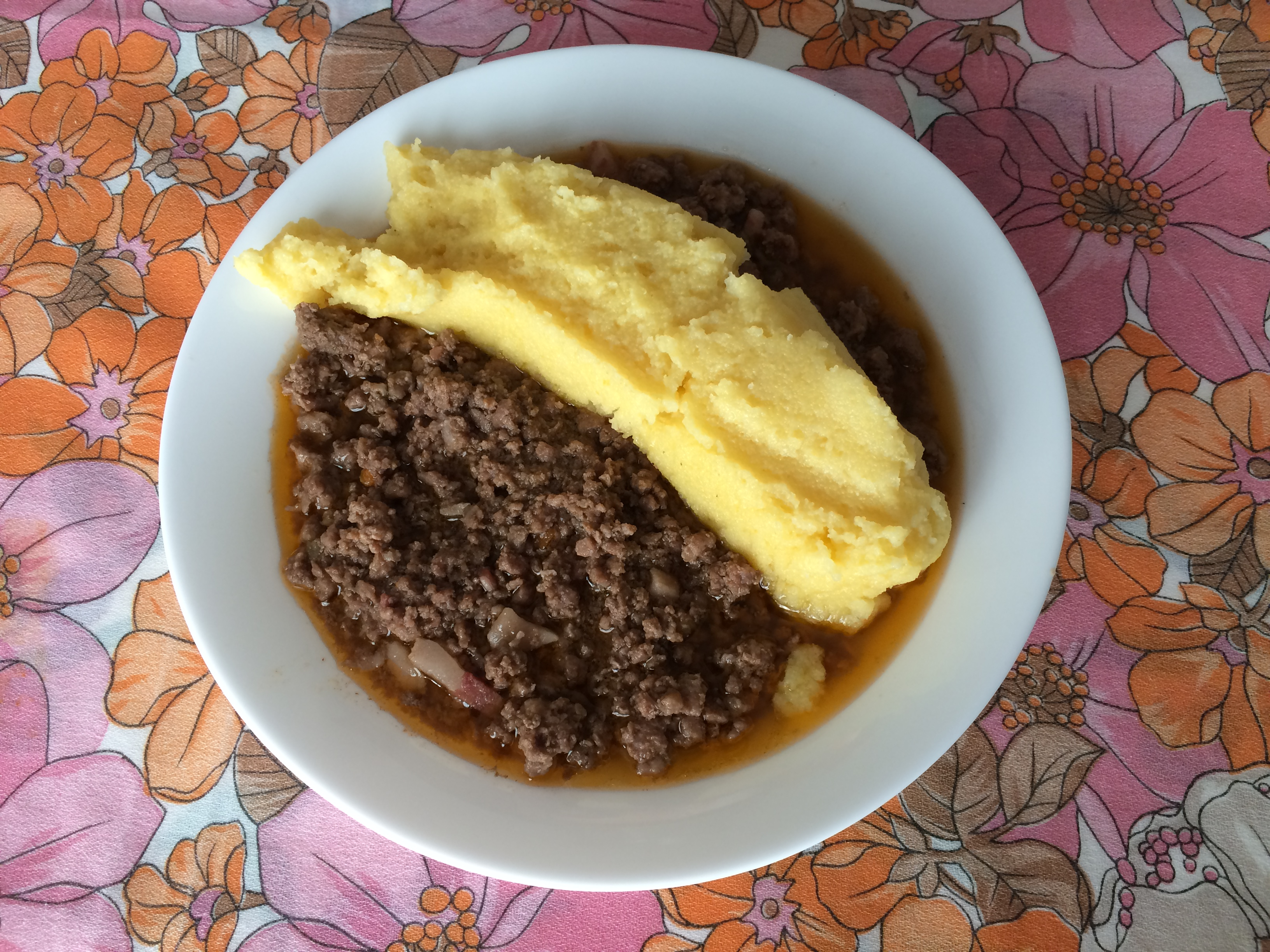
Bruscitti served with polenta porridge

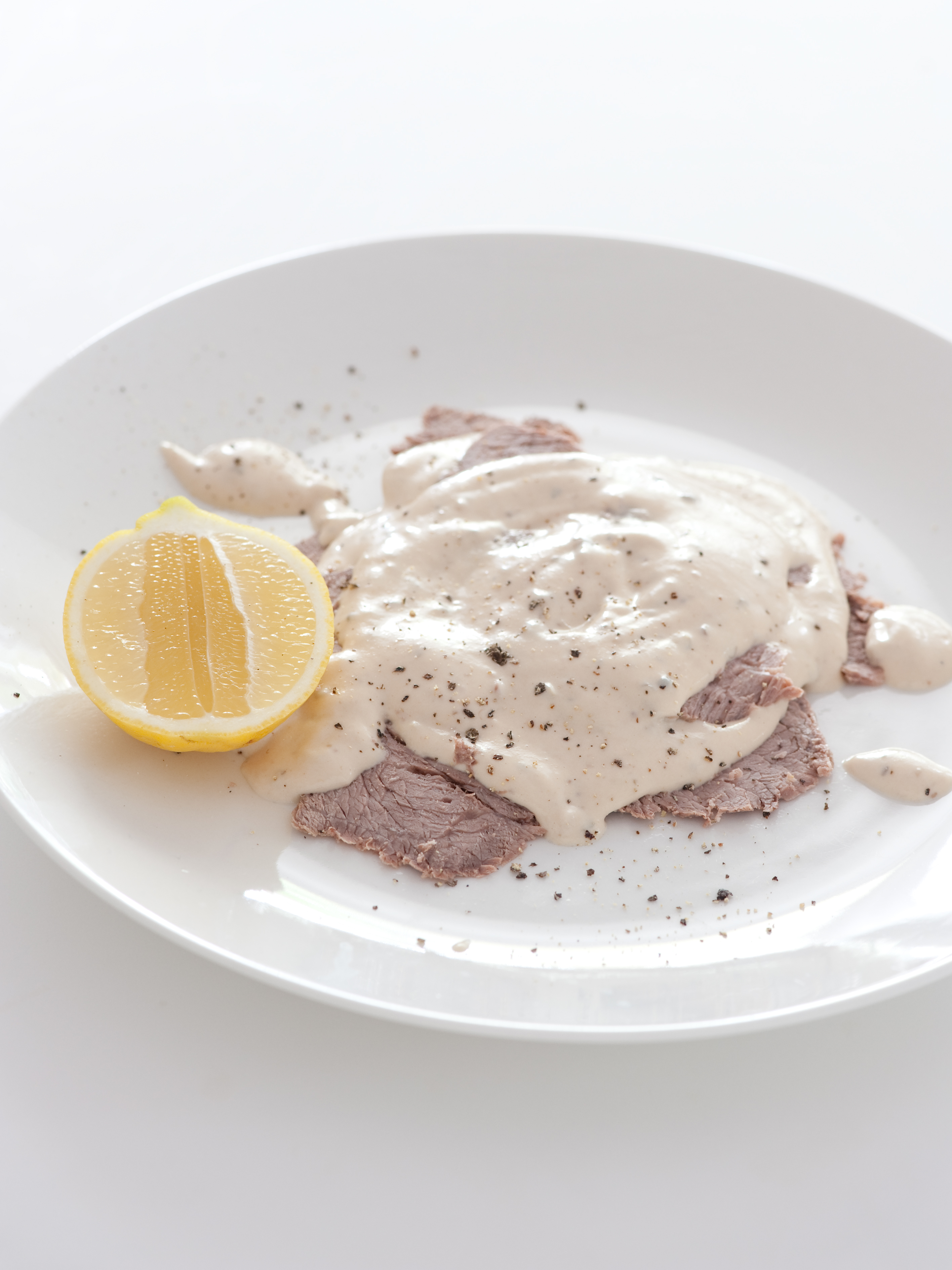
Vitello tonnato

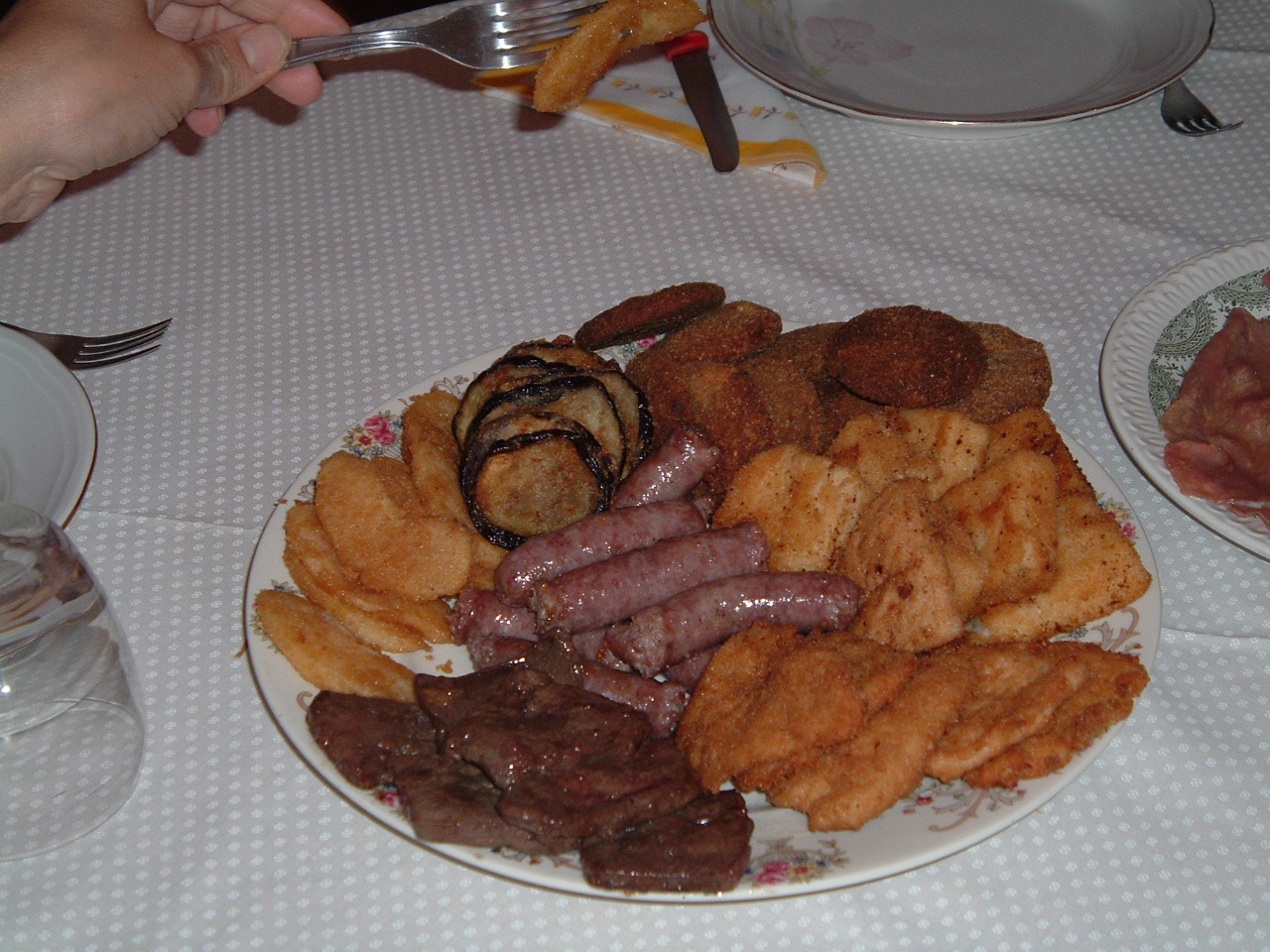
Fritto misto alla piemontese

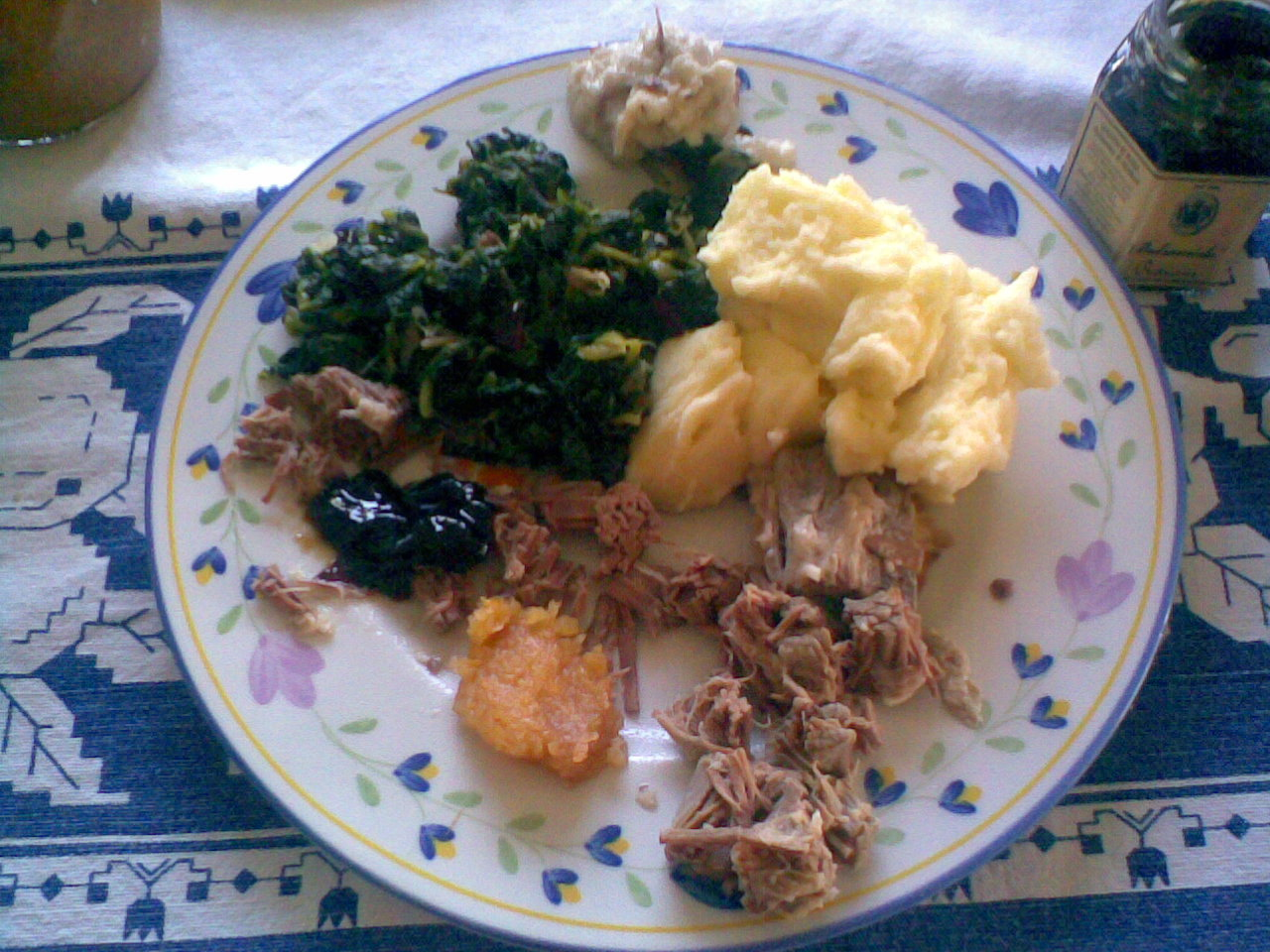
Bollito misto

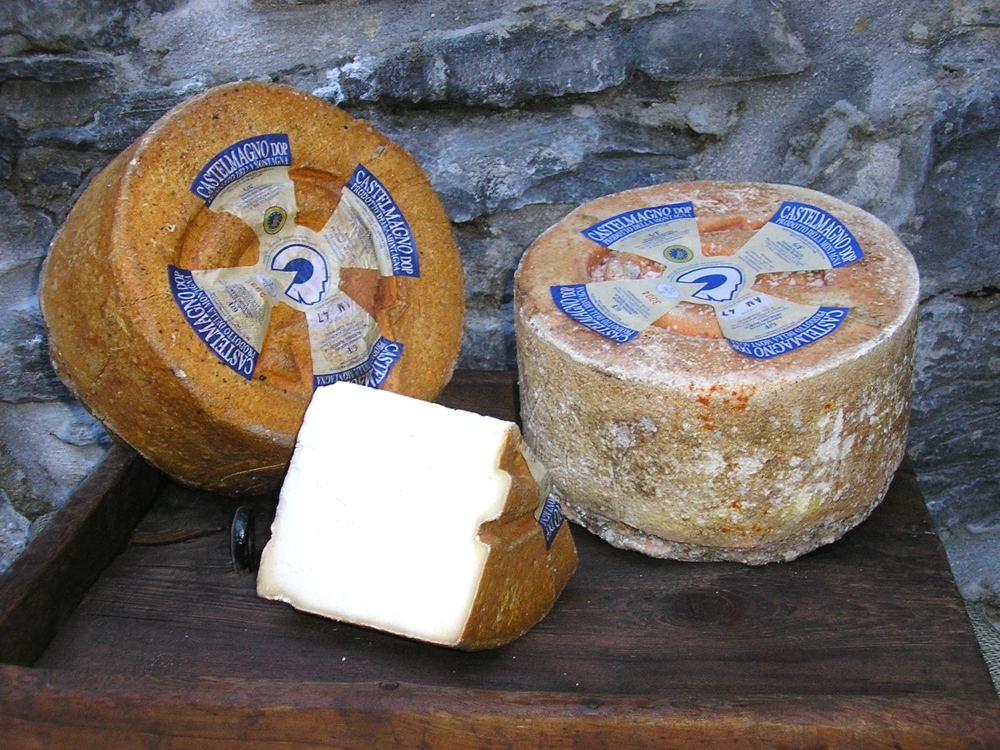
Castelmagno cheese

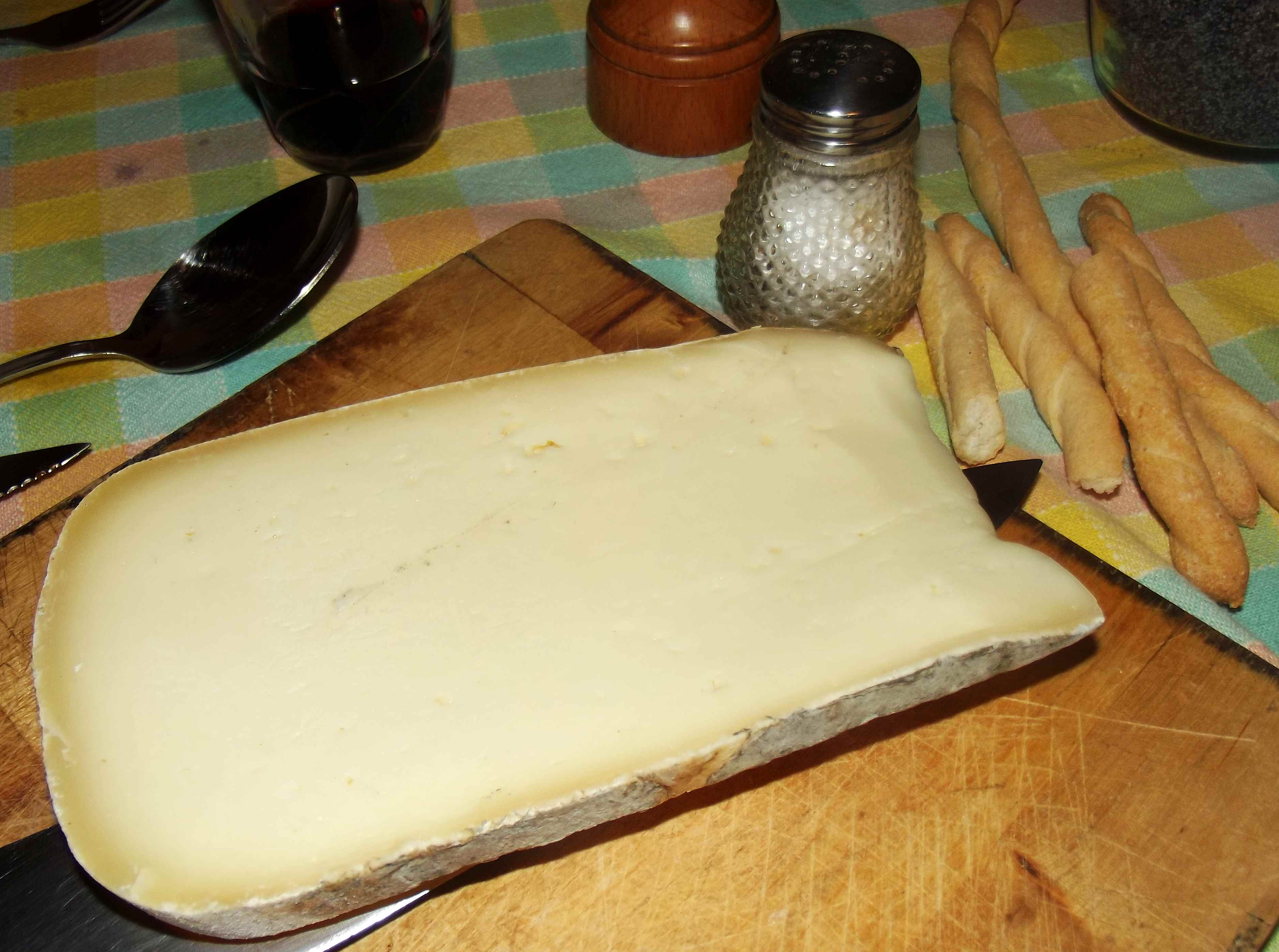
Raschera

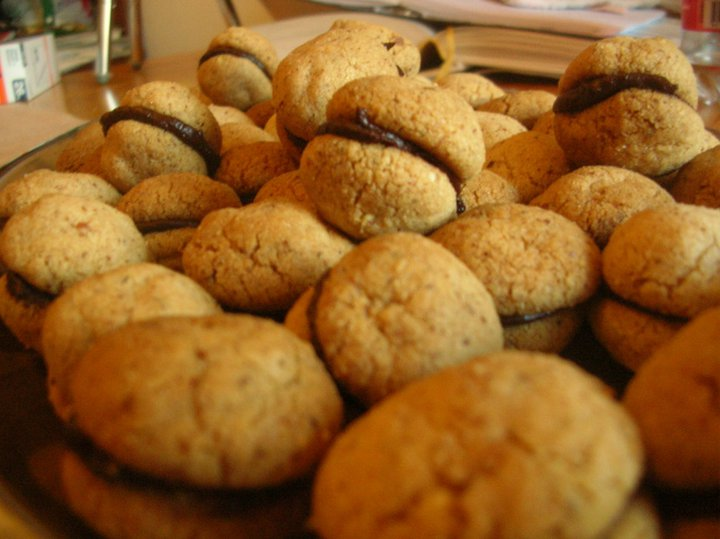
Baci di dama

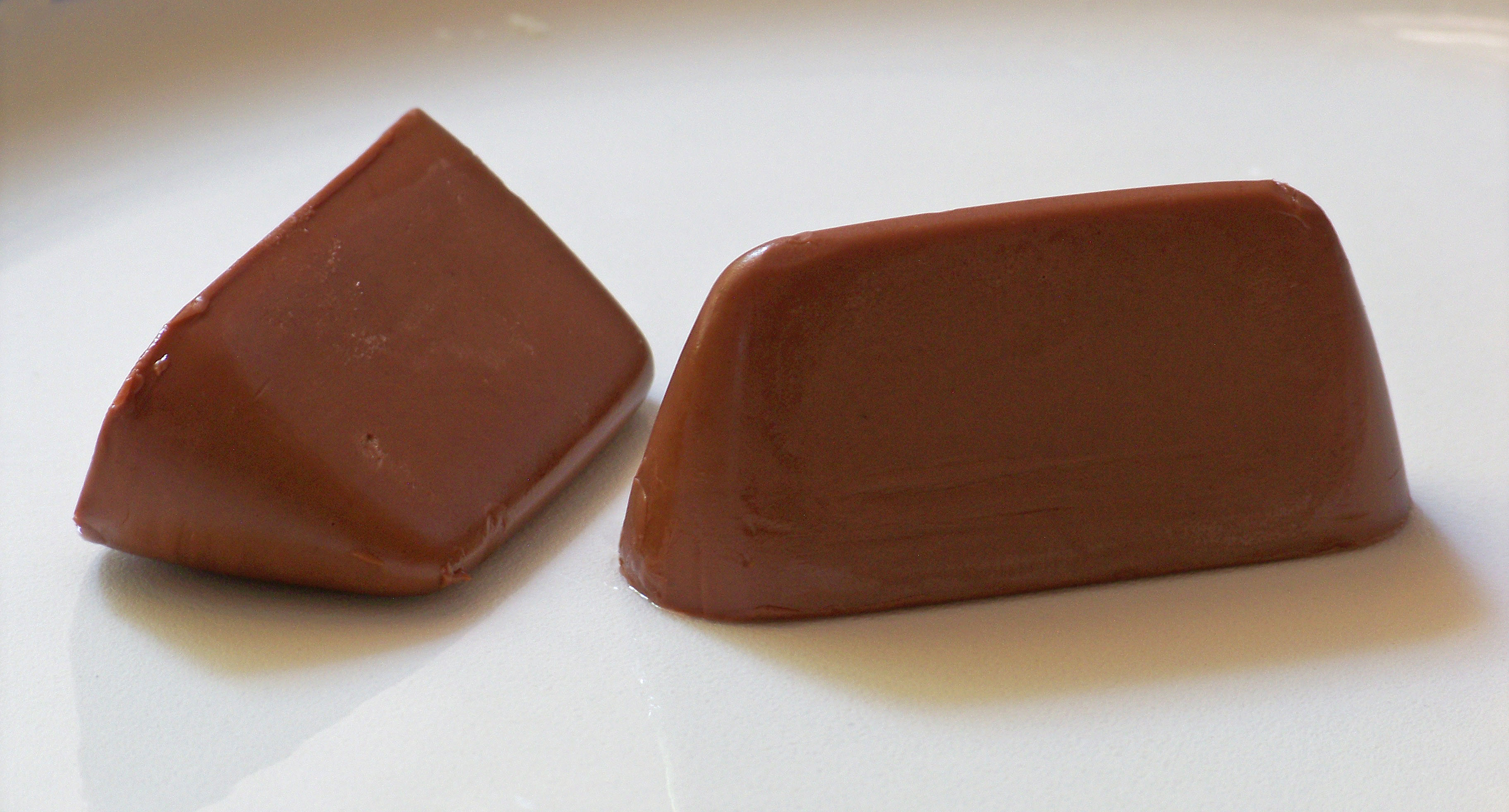
Gianduiotti

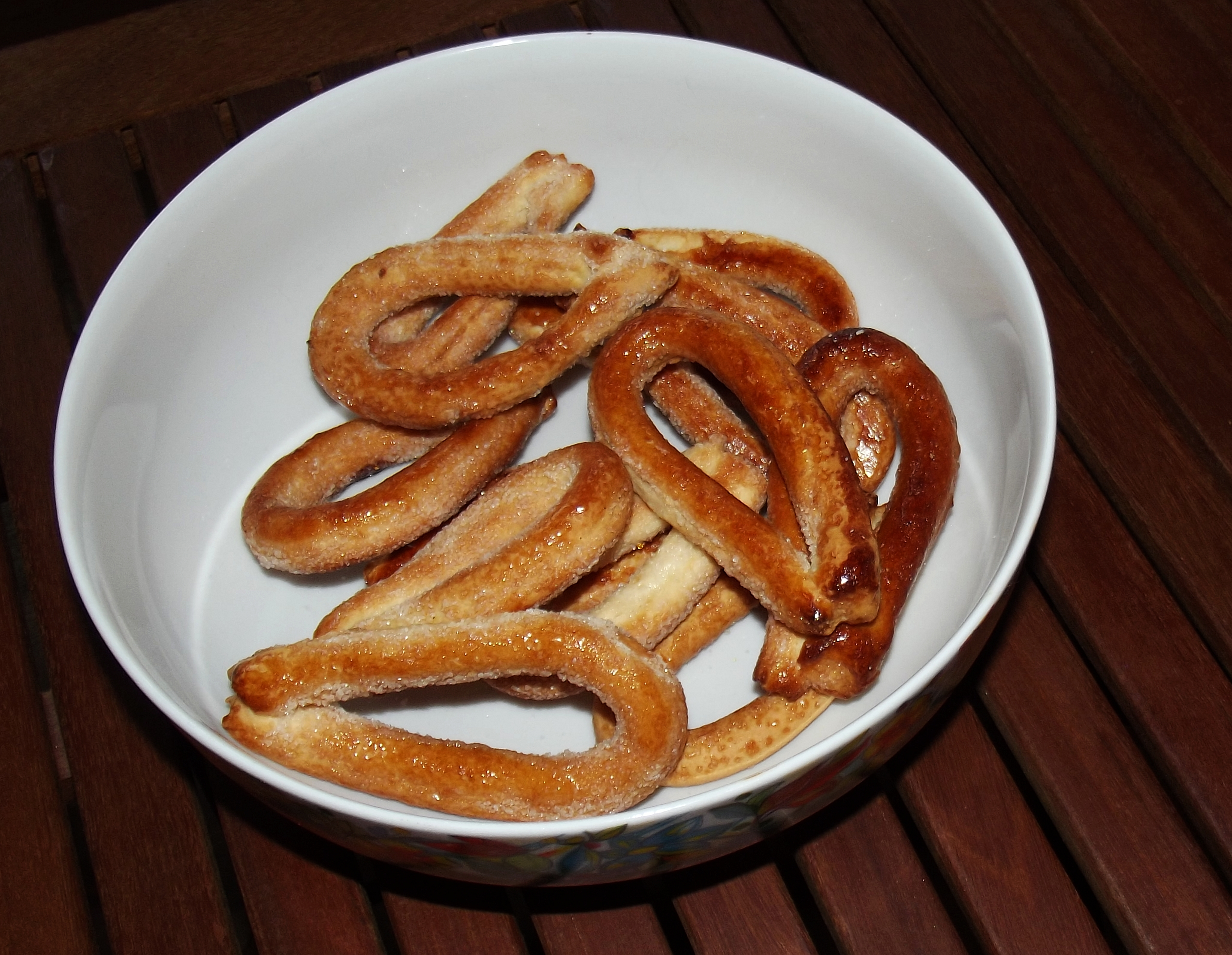
Torcetti

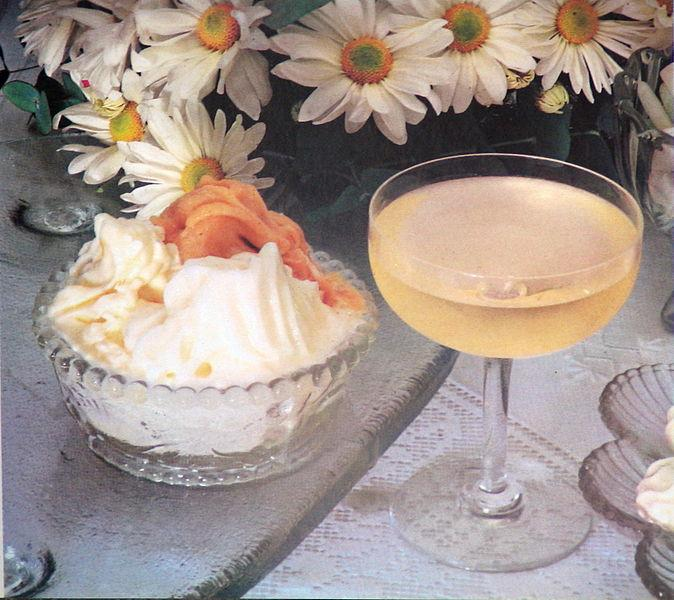
Asti wine

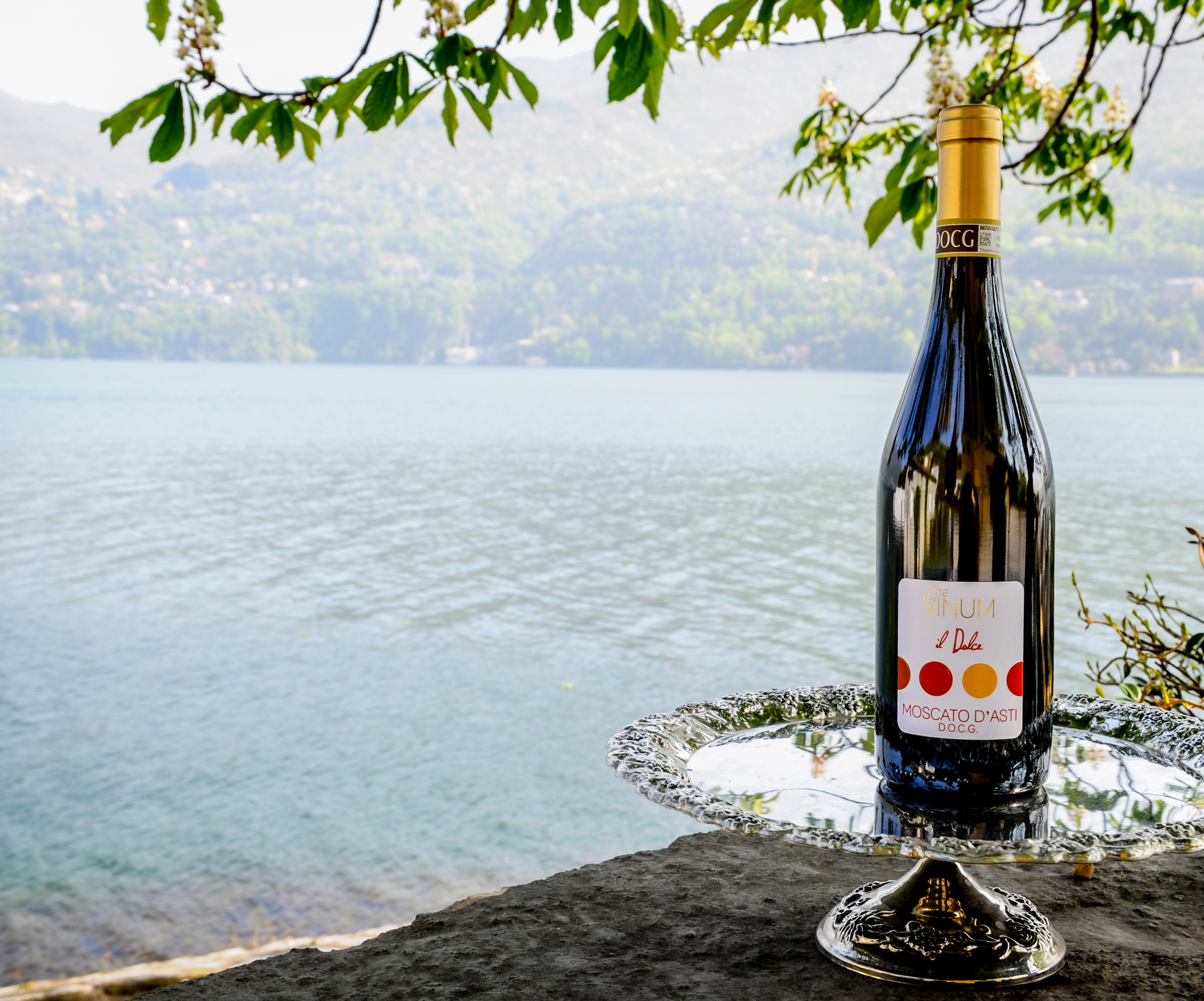
Moscato d'Asti

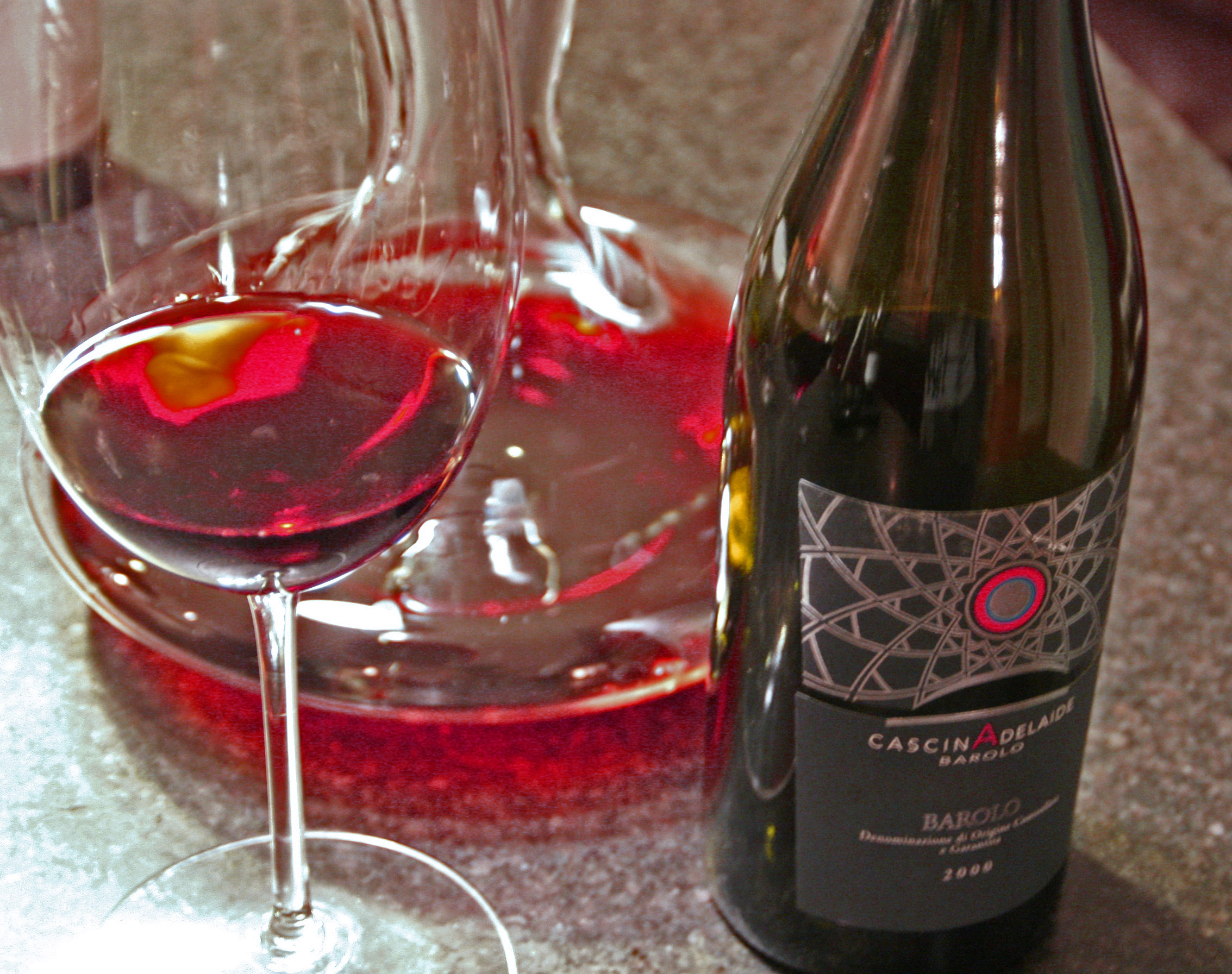
Barolo

Antipasti

- Batsoà - an ancient dish made from pig or veal trotters
- Carne cruda all'albese - a type of steak tartare from the town of Alba
- Carne in carpione
- Caponèt - a type of involtino stuffed with meat
- Cognà - a type of sweet sauce or relish usually served with cheese
- Giardiniera - an Italian relish of pickled vegetables in vinegar or oil
- Insalata di nervetti - an ancient dish made with braised veal trotters and vegetables
- Mocëtta - a type of cold cut from the Alp region of Italy
- Tartare
- Potato Subric
- Rabbit Tuna - shredded rabbit meat conserved in oil and aromatics on the website of Sonia Peronaci
- Trippa di Moncalieri - a type of salame made from tripe
- Vitello tonnato - thinly sliced veal with a creamy tuna sauce

Sauces

- Agliata verde - a green sauce made from parsley usually accompanied with cure meats or cheese
- Bagnet verd
- Bagnet ross
- Black olive paté

First courses

- Agnolòt (agnolotti) - Meat-filled pasta
- Agnolòt dël plin
- Gnocchi al Castelmagno
- Lasagne with pork blood
- Macaron del frèt
- Panissa - a type of risotto with beans and sausage
- Anchovy pasta
- Cheese polenta
- Polenta saracena
- Cheese risotto
- Risotto al barolo - risotto prepared with red barolo wine instead of white wine
- Nettle risotto
- Tajarin - a type of egg pasta
- Minestra maritata - a type of Italian wedding soup
- Zuppa mitonata - soup with escarole and meatballs in chicken broth

Second courses

- Sambucan lamb
- Bollito misto - a type of Italian stew made with veal or beef
- Barolo-braised meat
- Cappone
- Cervo al civet - red wine venison stew
- Bruscitti - a type of minced meat dish usually served during winter
- Fërse
- Finanziera
- Frittata di luvertin
- Nettle frittata
- Fritto misto alla piemontese
- Gallina di Saluzzo
- Lumache di Cherasco - sauteed snails
- Miroton
- Paletta
- Fried porcini
- Puccia
- Tapulon

Desserts

- Amaretti di Mombaruzzo, a type of macaroon
- Baci di dama
- Baci di gallina
- Biciulan
- Bonèt, a custard dessert similar to the French flan
- Canestrelli
- Piedmontese cannoli
- Cariton
- Coppa sabauda
- Cuneesi al rum
- Diablottini
- Finocchini
- Focaccia di Chieri
- Focaccia di Susa
- Lacabòn
- Fricieuj ëd pom
- Fugassa d’la Befana
- Gianduiotti
- Krumiri
- Marron glacé
- Meringa alla panna e meringata (cake)
- Nocciolini di Chivasso
- Paste di meliga
- Torta 900
- Torcetti
- Wine-poached pear

Breads

- Biova
- Ghërsin (breadsticks)

Cheeses

- Bettelmatt
- Bra cheese
- Bruss
- Castelmagno
- Cevrin di Coazze
- Escarun
- Frachet
- Gorgonzola
- Maccagno
- Murazzano
- Murianengo
- Paglierina
- Plaisentif
- Raschera
- Robiola
- Robiola di Cocconato
- Robiola di Roccaverano
- Salignon
- Seirass
- Testun
- Tome
- Tomini

Cured meats

- Bodin
- Frisse
- Grive
- Cooked salame
- Salame della rosa
- Salame di cinghiale
- Liver salame
- Salame mica della Val di Susa - a traditional Piedmontese salami made from pork and lard
- Salame di giora
- Salame di patate
- Salame di turgia
- Salame d'la doja
- Salame d'oca
- Salami al barolo
- Dried sausage

Wines

- Asti wine
- Barbaresco
- Barbera d'Asti
- Barolo
- Brachetto d'Acqui
- Cortese di Gavi
- Dolcetto di Dogliani
- Gattinara DOCG
- Ghemme DOCG
- Malvasia di Castelnuovo Don Bosco
- Moscato d'Asti
- Nizza DOCG
- Ruché

== See also ==
- Italian cuisine
- Cuisine of Abruzzo
- Apulian cuisine
- Arbëreshë cuisine
- Emilian cuisine
- Cuisine of Liguria
- Lombard cuisine
- Cuisine of Mantua
- Cuisine of Basilicata
- Neapolitan cuisine
- Roman cuisine
- Cuisine of Sardinia
- Sicilian cuisine
- Tuscan cuisine
- Venetian cuisine
- Piedmont wine

== Bibliography ==
- Piras, Claudia; Medagliani, Eugenio (2000). Culinaria Italy. Könemann Verlagsgesellschaft mbh. ISBN 3-8290-2901-2.
