= Taglioni =

Taglioni (Italian: [taʎˈʎoːni]) may refer to:

== Food ==
- Pasta taglioni, another name for tagliolini

== People ==
- Alice Taglioni (born 1976), French actress
- Fabio Taglioni (1920–2001), Italian engineer
- Filippo Taglioni (1777–1871), Italian dancer and choreographer, Marie and Paul's father
- Marie Taglioni (1804–1884), Swedish-Italian ballerina
- Paul Taglioni (1808–1883), German-Italian ballet master

== Ships ==
- Taglioni, a ship arriving in the colony of South Australia in 1844, bringing Christopher Rawson Penfold
