= Tonnato =

Tonnato may refer to:

- Vitello tonnato, a sauce from Italian cuisine
- "Tonnato" (The Bear), a 2025 episode of The Bear TV series
