= Crudités =

French appetizer consisting of raw vegetables

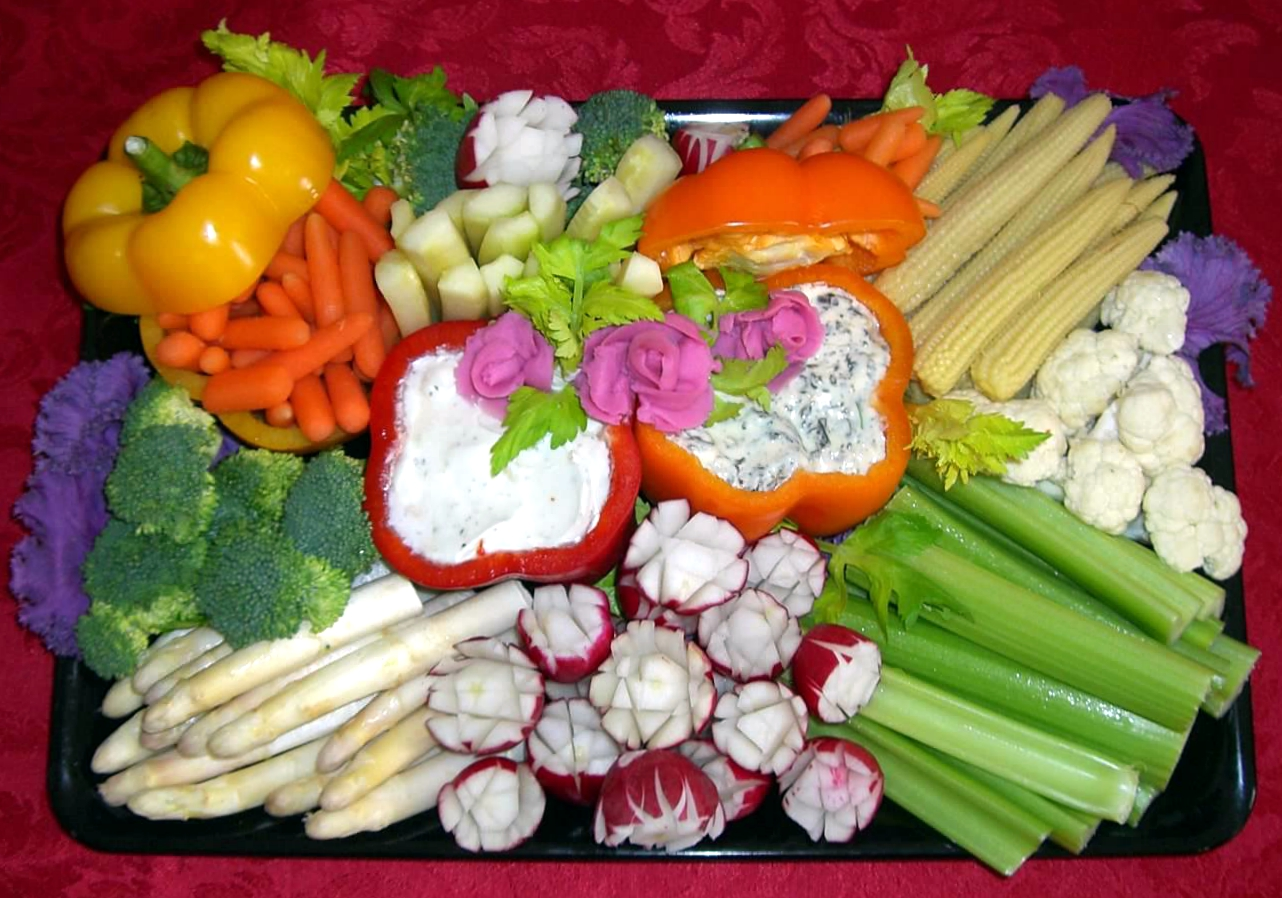
- Various crudités served at a cocktail party
- Course: Hors d'oeuvre
- Place of origin: France
- Main ingredients: Raw vegetables, vinaigrette or dipping sauce

Crudités (/ˈkruːdɪteɪ(z)/, French: [kʁydite]) are French appetizers consisting of sliced or whole raw vegetables which are typically dipped in a vinaigrette or other dipping sauce. Examples of crudités include celery sticks, carrot sticks, cucumber sticks, bell pepper strips, broccoli, cauliflower, radish, fennel, baby corn, and asparagus spears. Sauces used for dipping include bagna càuda and pinzimonio.

Crudités means "raw things", from Middle French crudité (around the 14th century), from Latin cruditatem (nominative cruditas), from crudus "rough; not cooked, raw, bloody". The term was first used in English c. 1960.

== See also ==
- List of hors d'oeuvre
