= Torcetti =

Northern Italian yeasted cookie

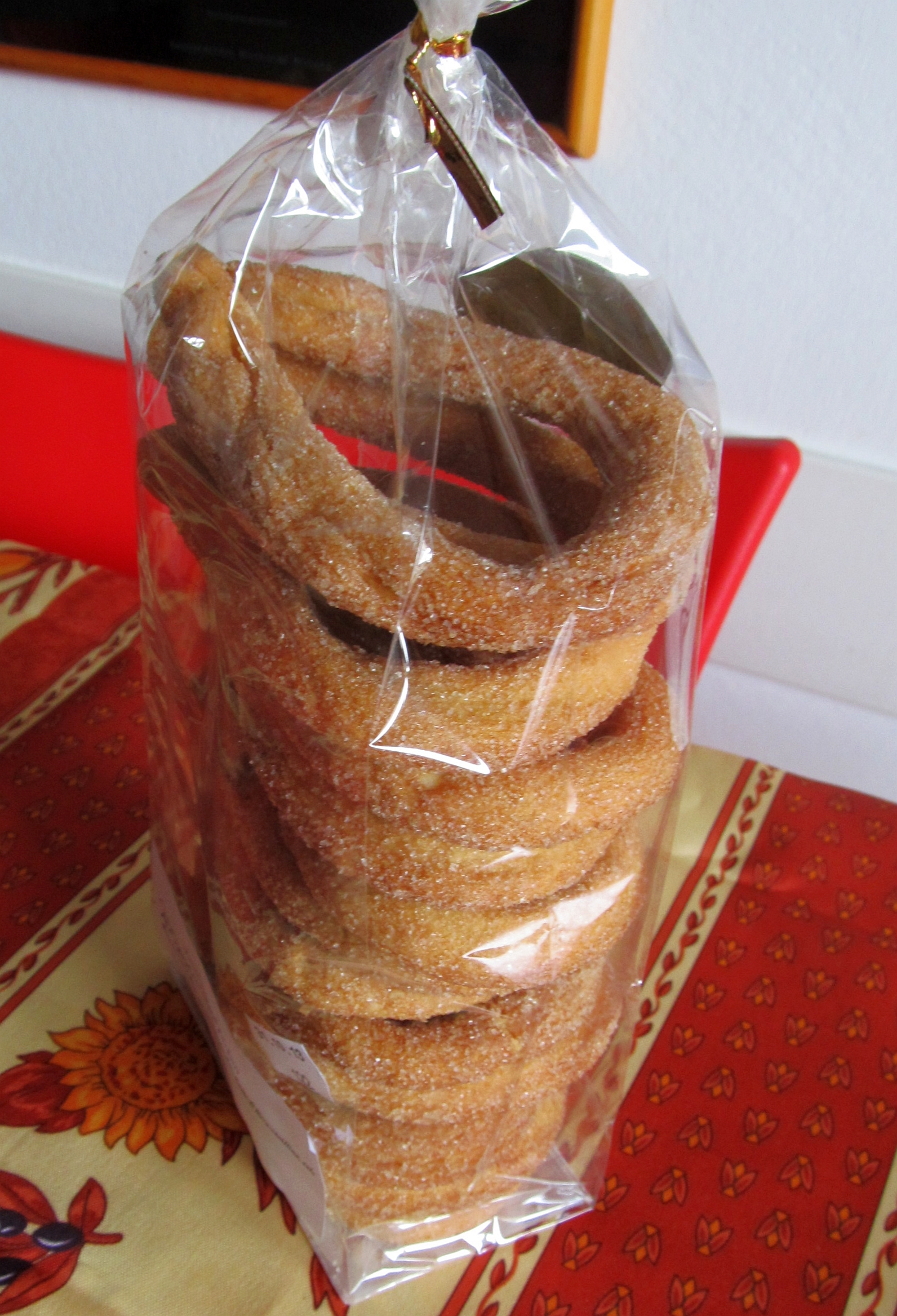
- Packaged Torcetti
- Alternative names: torcèt (Piedmontese)
- Type: Cookie
- Course: dessert
- Place of origin: Italy
- Region or state: Piedmont
- Main ingredients: butter, sugar, flour, yeast

Torcetti (Piedmontese: torcèt) are a type of yeasted cookie from the Northern Italian region of Piedmont. Torcetti have been classified as a traditional, protected Piedmontese product. They are most commonly made in Turin, the Lanzo Valleys, the Canavese region, and the Province of Biella. The name, which means "twisted" in Italian, derives from the twisted shape of the biscuits, which are similar to sweet version of grissini. Also related are the Saint-Vincent torcetti, produced in the Aosta Valley region.

== See also ==
Media related to Torcetti at Wikimedia Commons

- Piedmontese cuisine
- List of Italian desserts and pastries
