= Baci di dama =

Classic Italian sandwich cookie

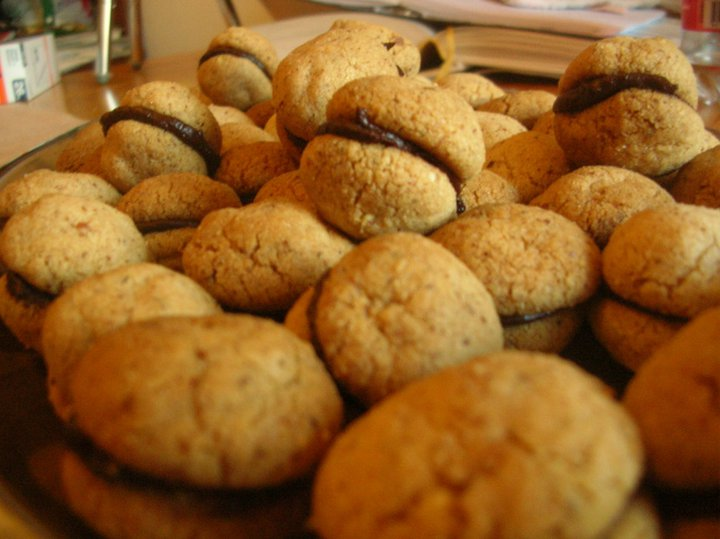
- Typical baci di dama with hazelnut cookies and chocolate filling
- Alternative names: Basin ëd dama (Piedmontese)
- Type: Cookie
- Place of origin: Italy
- Region or state: Piedmont
- Main ingredients: Hazelnuts, butter, sugar, flour, chocolate fondant

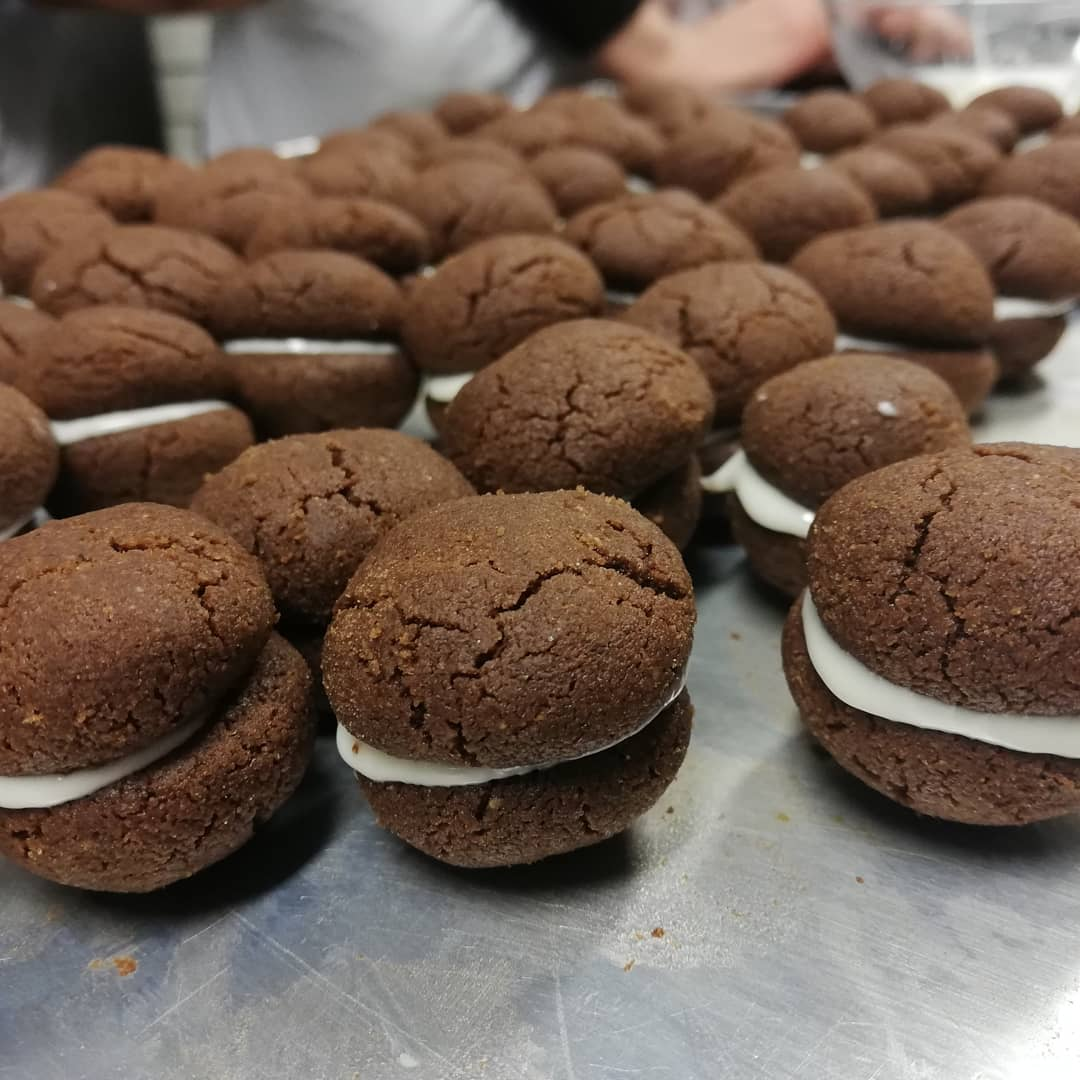
Chocolate baci di dama with a white chocolate filling

Baci di dama (Italian: [ˈbaːtʃi di ˈdaːma]; Piedmontese: basin ëd dama; lit. 'lady's kisses') are a type of northern Italian sandwich biscuit consisting of two hazelnut biscuits joined together by a chocolate filling, representing the "kiss" in the name. Considered a standard of Italian confectionery, these are a common item at bakeries throughout Italy and in Italian diaspora communities. Though traditionally made with hazelnut cookies, there are currently many modern flavour variations. The most common variations are made with almonds, pistachios, and cocoa in place of hazelnuts.

== History ==
Baci di dama originate from the town of Novi Ligure in the region of Piedmont. They were created between 1852 and 1893 as a way to utilize hazelnuts, which are local to Piedmont. Baci di dama have been classified as a traditional, protected Piedmontese product (PAT, i.e. prodotti agroalimentari tradizionali).

== See also ==
Media related to Baci di dama at Wikimedia Commons

- Piedmontese cuisine
- List of Italian desserts and pastries
