= Torta 900 =

Chocolate sponge cake

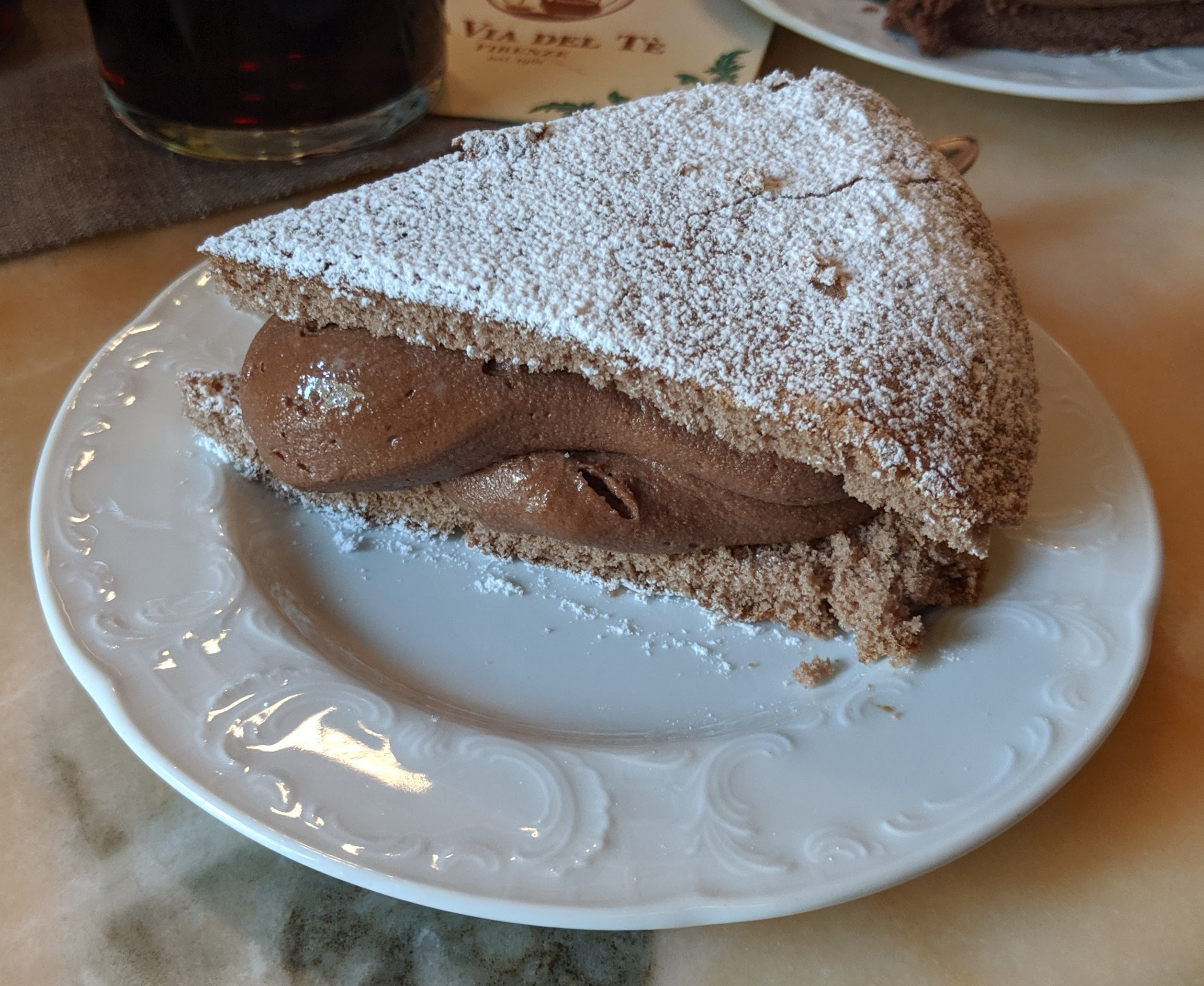
- Alternative names: Torta Novecento
- Type: Cake
- Place of origin: Italy
- Region or state: Ivrea, Piedmont
- Created by: Ottavio Bertinotti

Torta 900, also spelled torta Novecento, is a layer cake consisting of chocolate sponge cake and a mascarpone, whipped cream, and chocolate filling produced in the comune (municipality) of Ivrea, Italy.

== History ==
The cake was invented by the pastry chef Ottavio Bertinotti from Ivrea at the end of the 19th century and was named after the new century. In 1972, the patent for the cake was acquired by Umberto Balla for his pastry shop in Ivrea, where it is currently prepared. Although the cake is exclusive to that pastry shop, it has become a symbol of the town itself. During the Carnival of Ivrea, an exceptionally large torta 900 is consumed.

== Description ==
The cake is made of two very soft cocoa sponge cake layers filled with a cream made of mascarpone, whipped cream, and chocolate. The top of the cake is covered with powdered sugar and decorated with the inscription torta 900. The recipe for the cake has never been revealed.

== See also ==
Media related to Torta 900 at Wikimedia Commons

- Piedmontese cuisine
- List of Italian desserts and pastries
