= Bonet (dessert) =

Piedmontese custard dessert

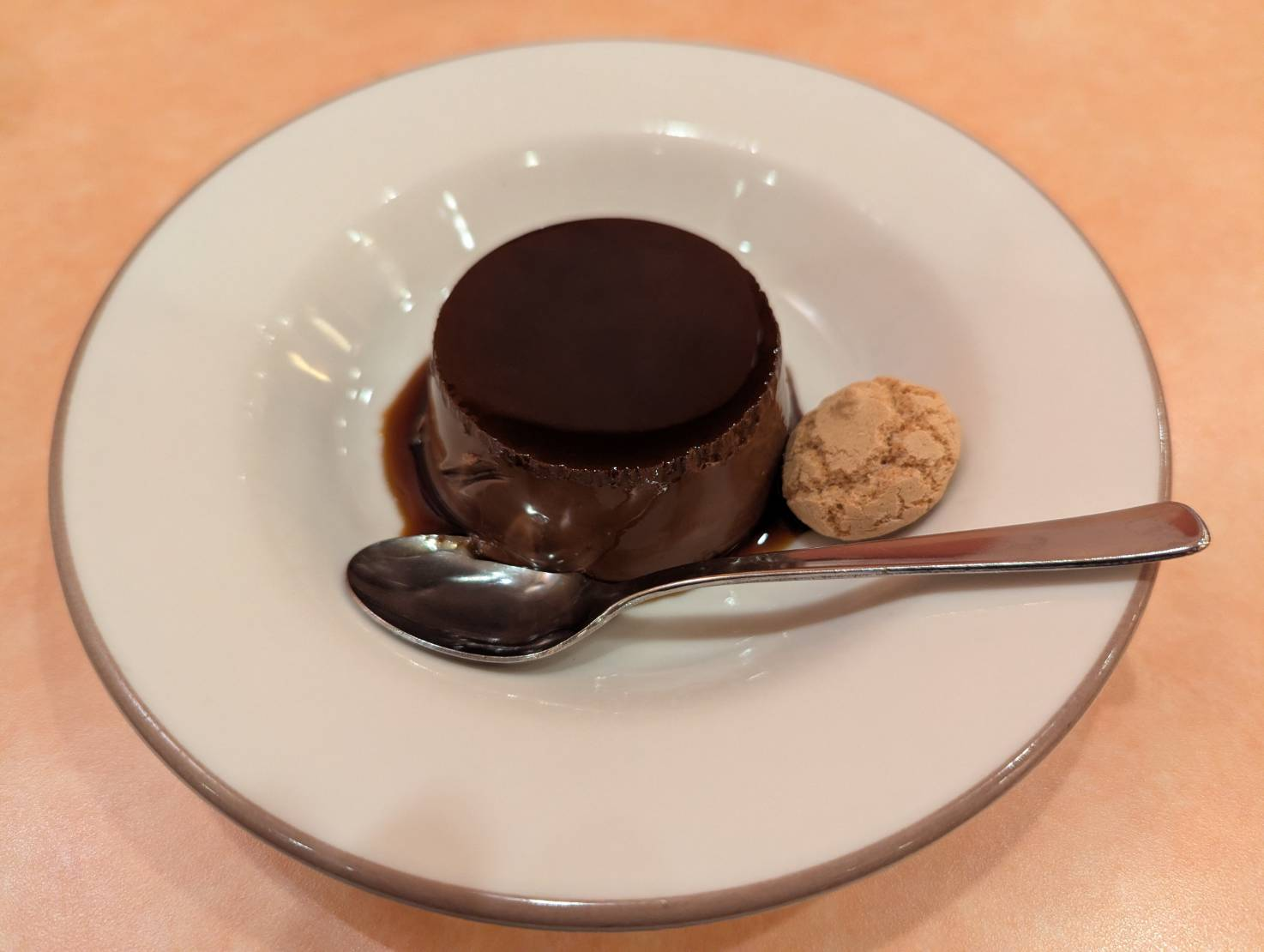
Bonet

Bonet or bunet is a Piedmontese custard dessert. It is prepared very similarly to crème caramel, except for the addition of amaretto, cocoa powder, and sometimes rum. The custard is made by combining eggs, milk, cocoa powder, and sugar. The mixture is then poured over a caramel sauce and cooked in a bain-marie.

The name of the dish means "bonnet", suggested since 1859 to be a reference to the hat-like shape it takes when prepared in a round, typically copper mould. This hat shape is no longer ubiquitous. An alternative theory has its name a reference to its role in "capping" a meal. Anna Del Conte describes the dish as having a "rich" flavour, tasting of caramel and almonds, with a "silky" texture. She suggests preparing it in advance to allow the flavours to develop, but warns it should only be frozen for a short time to avoid removing the flavour.

The magazine Agrodolce identifies the bonet as evolving from the dessert Monferrina, which was a version of the dish without cocoa that was being made in 17th century in Italy.

== See also ==
Media related to Bonet (dessert) at Wikimedia Commons

- Piedmontese cuisine
- List of Italian desserts and pastries
- List of custard desserts
