= Batsoà =

Dish from Piedmont, Italy

- Type: Braise
- Course: Main course
- Place of origin: Italy
- Region or state: Piedmonte
- Main ingredients: Pig's trotter

Batsoà is an ancient dish from the Piedmont region of Italy. It was traditionally made from fried pig's trotter. The name of the dish originally comes from the French bas de soie, meaning 'silk stockings', referring to the tenderness of the meal.

== Preparation ==
The feet are first cleaned and cut in half lengthwise. Then they are cooked in water and vinegar for two to three hours until the rind and cartilages are softened. The feet are then deboned, drenched in beaten eggs and corn flour, and then fried in butter.

== See also ==
- Piedmontese cuisine
