= Pinzimonio =

Italian dipping sauce

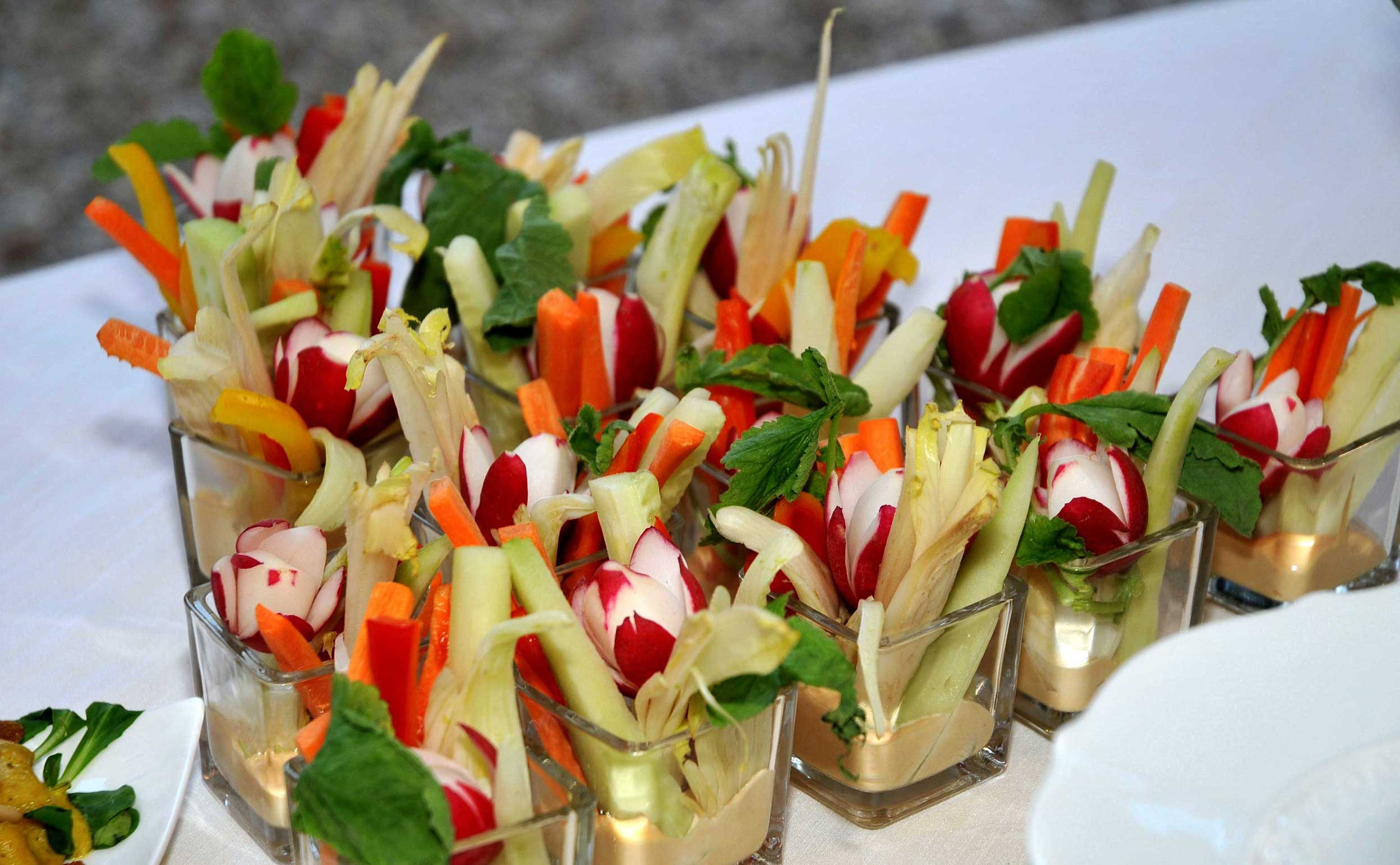
Raw vegetables (crudités) served in cups with pinzimonio

Pinzimonio is an Italian dipping sauce made with olive oil, salt, pepper, and occasionally wine vinegar, which is served with raw vegetables (crudités) typically cold. It is used similarly to bagna càuda, but is simpler and served cold.

Pinzimonio is popular in the area around Rome, with preparations sometimes including lemon juice. The sauce is served in small cups, one per diner. In the summer, it eaten as antipasto. The sauce is also popular in Tuscany. Vegetables eaten with pinzimonio include baby artichokes, celery, endives, fennel, and sweet capsicum. During the Renaissance, fruit and vegetables were used in banquets as decoration. Over time, a practice developed where the produce was dipped in the sauces of the dishes they decorated, and by the 19th century the dip was replaced with olive oil. The name is a blend of pinzare ('staple') and matrimonio ('wedding'). In areas of southern and central Italy (including Rome), it is known as cazzimperio.
