= Bruscitti =

Italian beef dish

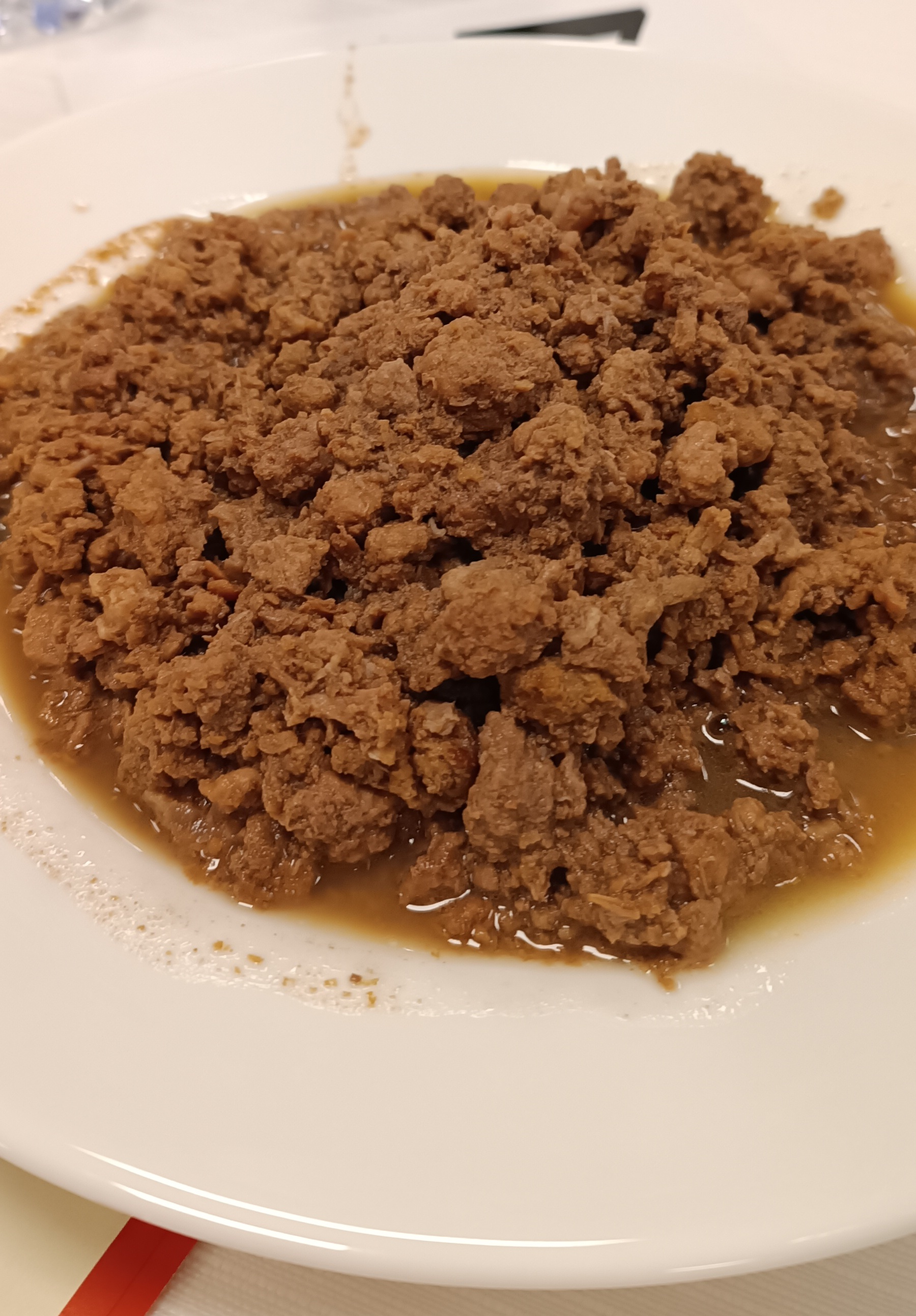
- Bruscitti
- Alternative names: Brüscitt (Lombard)
- Type: Meat
- Course: Secondo (Italian course)
- Place of origin: Italy
- Region or state: Lombardy (comune of Busto Arsizio); Piedmont
- Associated cuisine: Lombard cuisine; Piedmontese cuisine; Ticinese cuisine
- Invented: Probably Middle Ages
- Main ingredients: Beef
- Ingredients generally used: Butter, lard, garlic, fennel seeds, pancetta, red wine
- Food energy (per 100 g serving): 112.63 kcal (471.2 kJ)
Nutritional value
(per 100 g serving)
- Protein: 6.73 g
- Fat: 4.93 g
- Carbohydrate: 10.05 g
- Other information: Widespread in northwestern Lombardy (Italy), northeastern Piedmont (Italy) and lower Ticino (Switzerland)

Bruscitti (Italian: [bruˈʃitti]; Lombard: brüscitt, Lombard: [bryˈʃit]; lit. 'crumbs') is an Italian single-course meal of the Lombard, Piedmontese, and Ticinese cuisines based on finely chopped beef cooked for a long time. It is a typical winter dish and is served with polenta, purée, or risotto alla milanese.

Bruscitti is originally from the comune (municipality) of Busto Arsizio, Lombardy, Italy. Bruscitti is widespread in northwestern Lombardy (Italy), northeastern Piedmont (Italy), and lower Ticino (Switzerland). The dish probably originated in the Middle Ages.

== Etymology ==
In the Lombard language the term brüscitt means 'crumbs', referring to the size of the meat, chopped into small pieces.

== Description ==
Based on finely chopped beef and cooked for a long time (from 2 to 4 hours) on a low flame, the other ingredients of the dish are butter, garlic, fennel seeds, and lard or pancetta. At the end of cooking, it is blended with well-structured red wines such as Barbera, Barolo or Nebbiolo. When serving, the bruscitti must not be too soupy or too dry. It is a typical winter dish and is served with polenta, risotto alla milanese or purée.

For a 100 g serving of bruscitti, the food energy is 112.63 kcal (472 kJ), while nutritional values are 6.73 g of proteins, 4.93 g of fats (of which 2.29 g saturated fatty acids), 1.14 g of fibres, and 10.05 g of carbohydrates (of which 1.21 g sugars).

== Geographical diffusion ==
The dish is widespread in the whole Insubria area, or in the province of Varese (Lombardy), in the Alto Milanese area (Lombardy; particularly in the area of the comune (municipality) of Busto Arsizio, where it originates), in the province of Verbano-Cusio-Ossola (Piedmont), and in lower Ticino (Switzerland).

== History ==
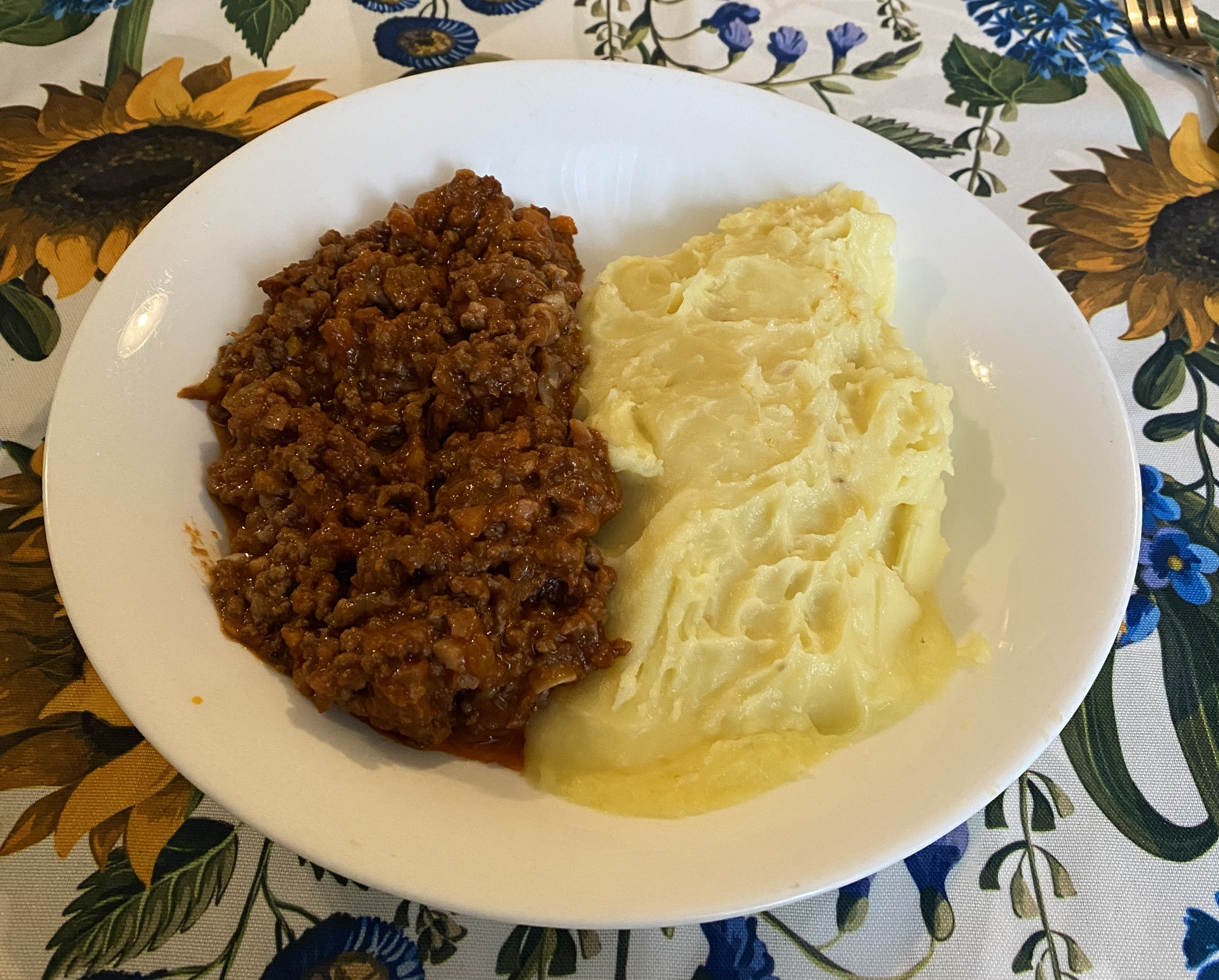
Bruscitti served with purée

Bruscitti is originally from the comune (municipality) of Busto Arsizio, Lombardy, Italy. It is a dish of the ancient peasant tradition. The dish probably originated in the Middle Ages. The first hypothesis on its origin traces its birth to the use of shreds of beef that remained attached to tanning hides (in fact, many tanneries were active in Busto Arsizio). Another hypothesis on the origin of the dish can be traced back to the total pulping of the bones of the steers, i.e. the recovery of those parts that were discarded from the tables of the richest. Until the Italian economic miracle of the 1950s and 1960s, tougher cuts of the beef were used for bruscitti, which required longer cooking. Later, more tender cuts began to be used such as the cappello del prete, the diaframma, the fusello, and the reale.

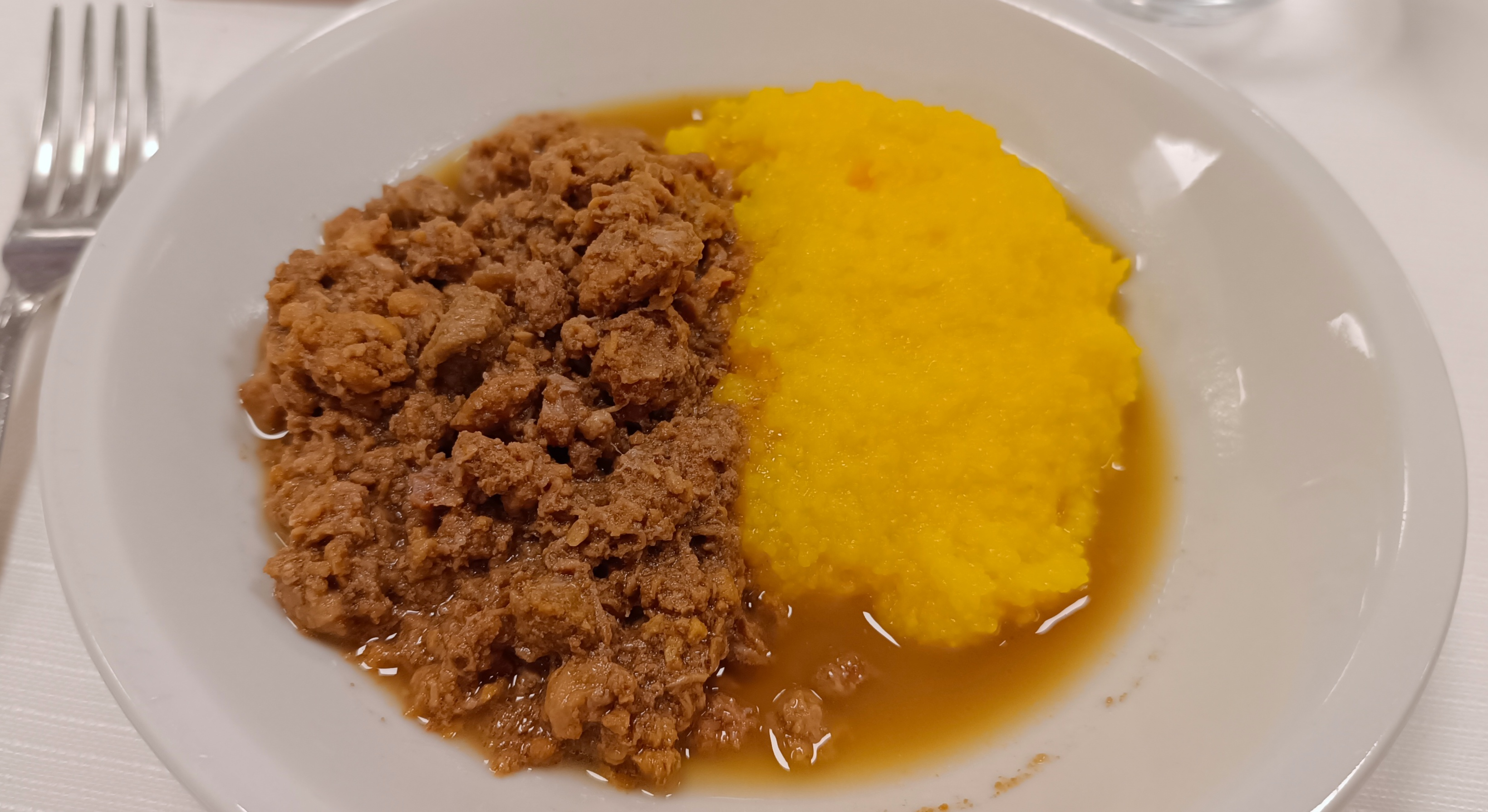
Bruscitti served with polenta porridge

Originally, the less tender or typically discarded parts of beef were used. It was a humble but invigorating dish, which was created with the aim of providing refreshment to the farmers who worked in the fields. The dish was born from the need to cook a dish that would cook very slowly on the embers of the fireplace, without the need for much attention and then be finished off at the end of cooking with a touch of wine. Tradition dictates that the meat is cut into small pieces using a knife so as not to lose its juices.

In 1975 in Busto Arsizio the Magistero dei Bruscitti ('Bruscitti Magisterium') was founded, an association with the aim of spreading knowledge of local rustic cuisine. On 16 December 2012, the mayor of Busto Arsizio established "the day of bruscitti" (Ul dí di bruscitti in Lombard), which occurs every second Thursday in November. In 2014 the comune of Busto Arsizio recognized the denominazione comunale d'origine (De.CO) for bruscitti.

== See also ==
- Lombard cuisine
- Piedmontese cuisine
- Ticinese cuisine
- List of beef dishes
