= Vitello tonnato =

Veal dish

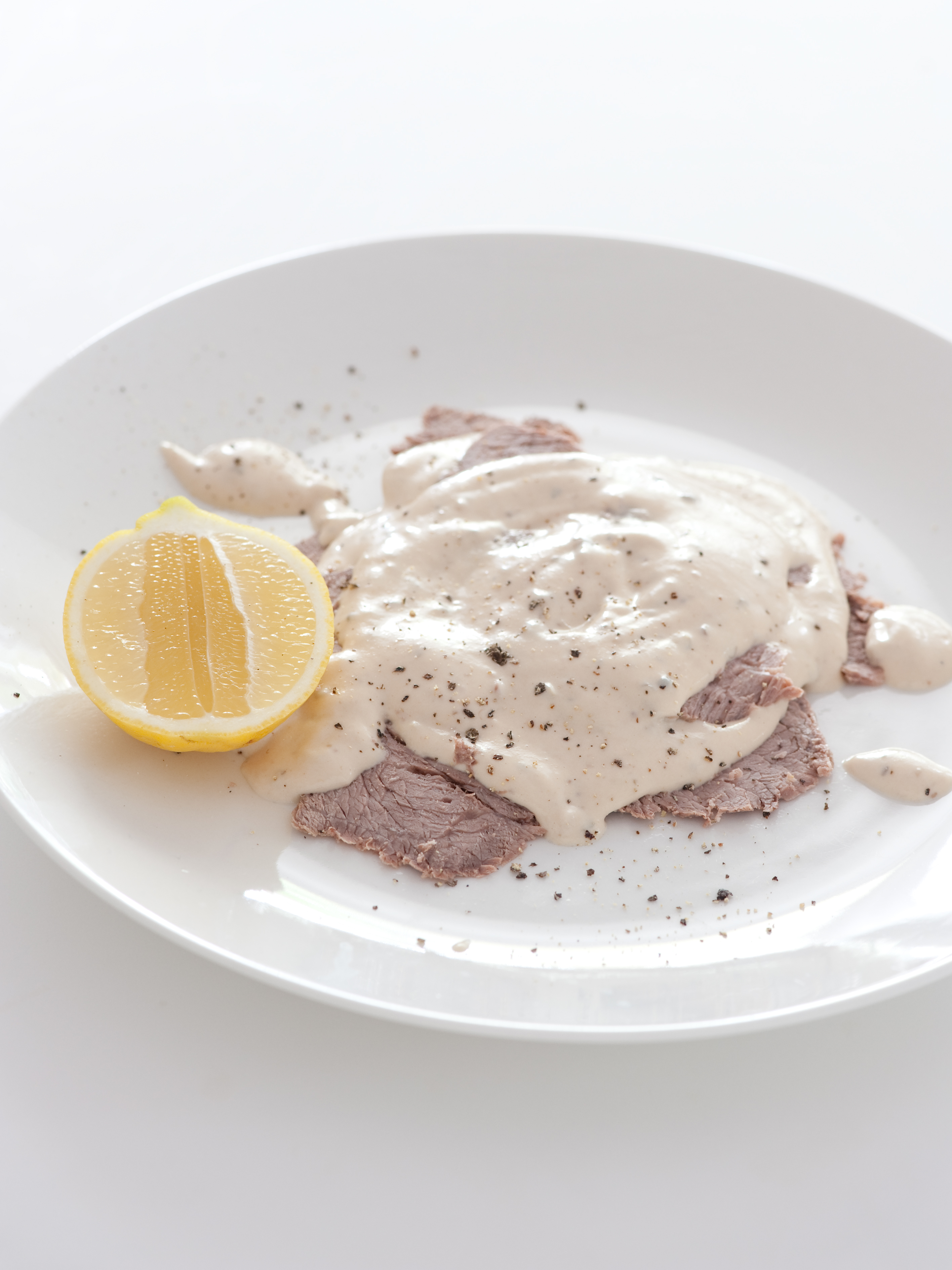
Vitello tonnato

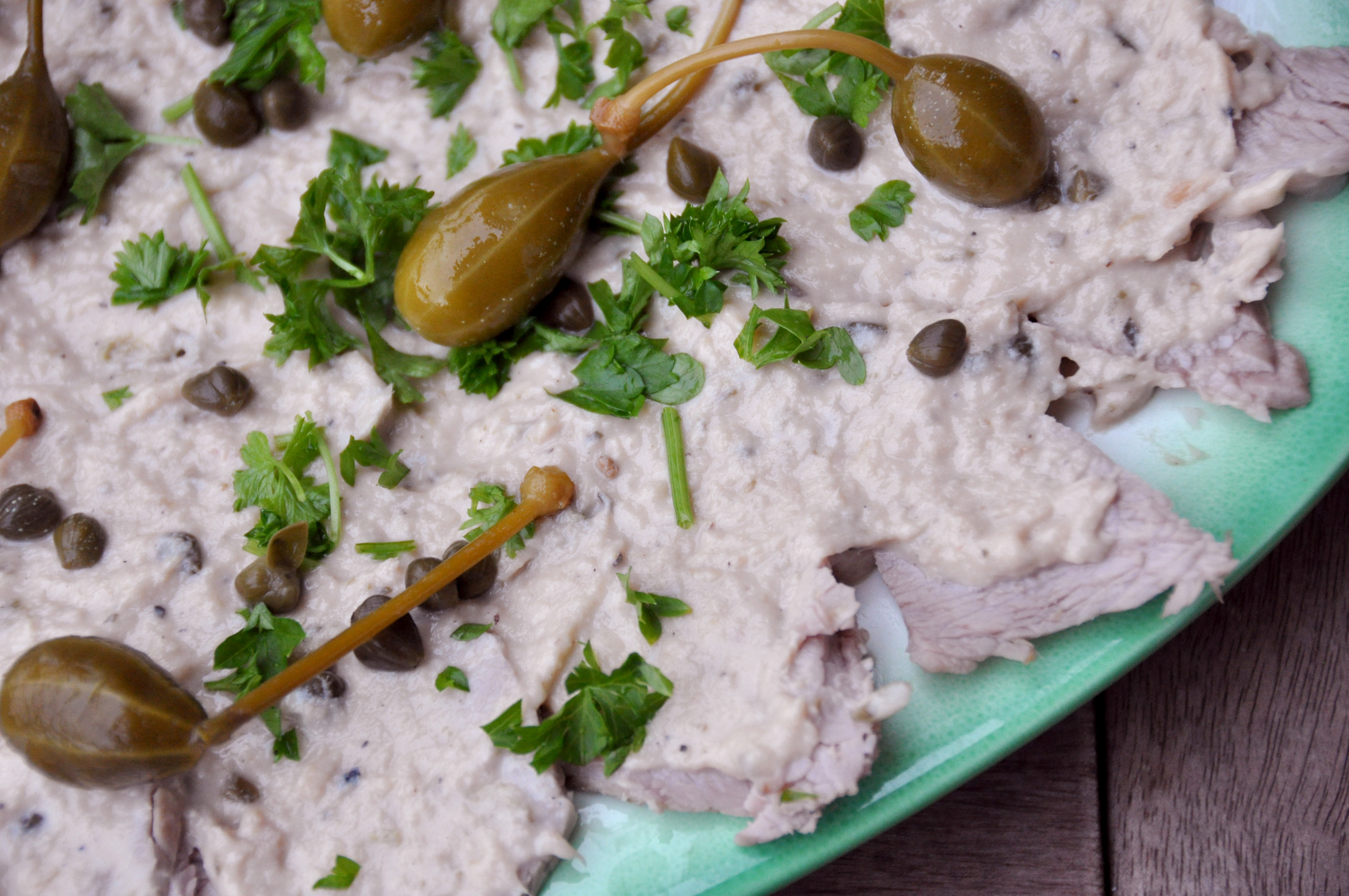
A close-up view of vitello tonnato

Vitello tonnato is a Piedmontese dish of cold, thinly sliced veal topped with a creamy, mayonnaise-style sauce flavored with tuna. The dish is typically served chilled or at room temperature, especially in summer, either as a main course or an antipasto. It is also widely enjoyed in Argentina, Paraguay, and Uruguay—introduced there by Italian immigrants—where it keeps its original Piedmontese name vitel tonnè (often spelled vitel toné or thoné in Argentina) and is considered a traditional Christmas dish.

Preparing vitello tonnato begins at least a day in advance. A cut of veal from the back leg, usually eye round, is braised or simmered and then sliced thinly. The sauce is made from canned tuna blended with olive oil, vegetable oil, and egg yolks in an electric blender or food processor to create a thick mayonnaise-like texture. Various seasonings can be used, such as anchovies, cayenne pepper, capers, and lemon juice.

The resulting smooth purée is thinned slightly with water and some of the veal's cooking liquid, and additional capers are stirred in. A layer of sauce is spread on a serving platter, the cold veal slices are arranged on top, and the remaining sauce is then poured over them until fully covered. The finished dish is refrigerated for up to five days, allowing the flavors to deepen and meld.

== See also ==
Media related to Vitello tonnato at Wikimedia Commons

- Piedmontese cuisine
- List of veal dishes

== Bibliography ==
- Field, Michael; Knopf, Alfred A. (1967). Michael Field's Culinary Classics and Improvisations. New York. pp. 67–68.
