= Subric =

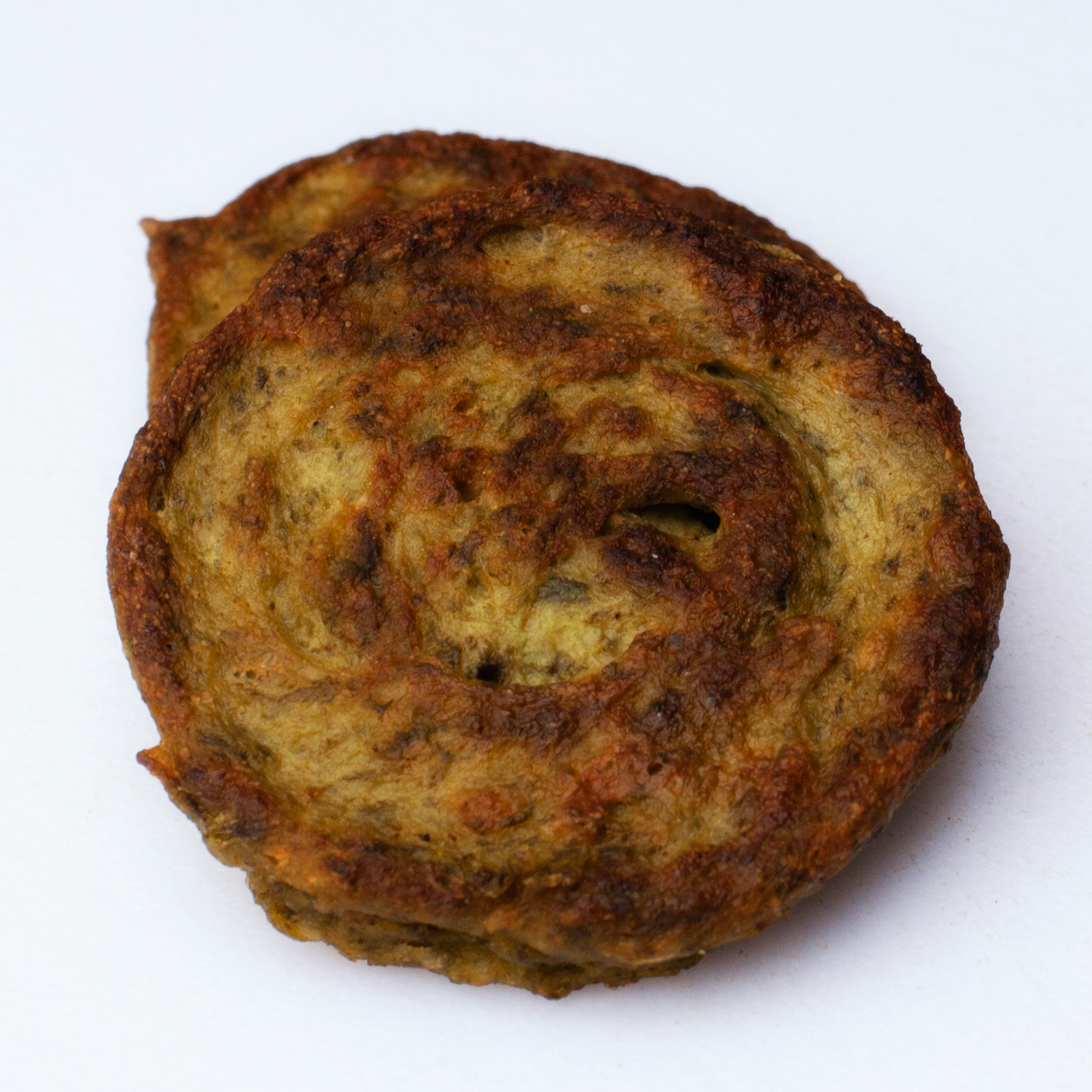
- Course: Hors-d’œuvre
- Place of origin: France
- Main ingredients: Flour, eggs
- Ingredients generally used: Cream

Subric is a classic French dish similar to croquettes or pancakes. It is made from puréed or minced meats and vegetables which are thickened with flour, eggs, and sometimes cream. The batter is then shaped and divided into smaller portions and sautéed in clarified butter. Subrics are usually accompanied with a white sauce such as béchamel or allemande sauce. They are usually served as an hors-d’œuvre, amuse-bouche, or side dish. They can also be made sweet and serve as a dessert.

The recipes for subric first appeared in the 19th century in French chef Urbain Dubois' La cuisine classique. They became popular at the turn of the 20th century.

== See also ==
- Crêpe
- Galette
- List of French dishes

Portal:Food
