= Tagliolini =

Type of pasta

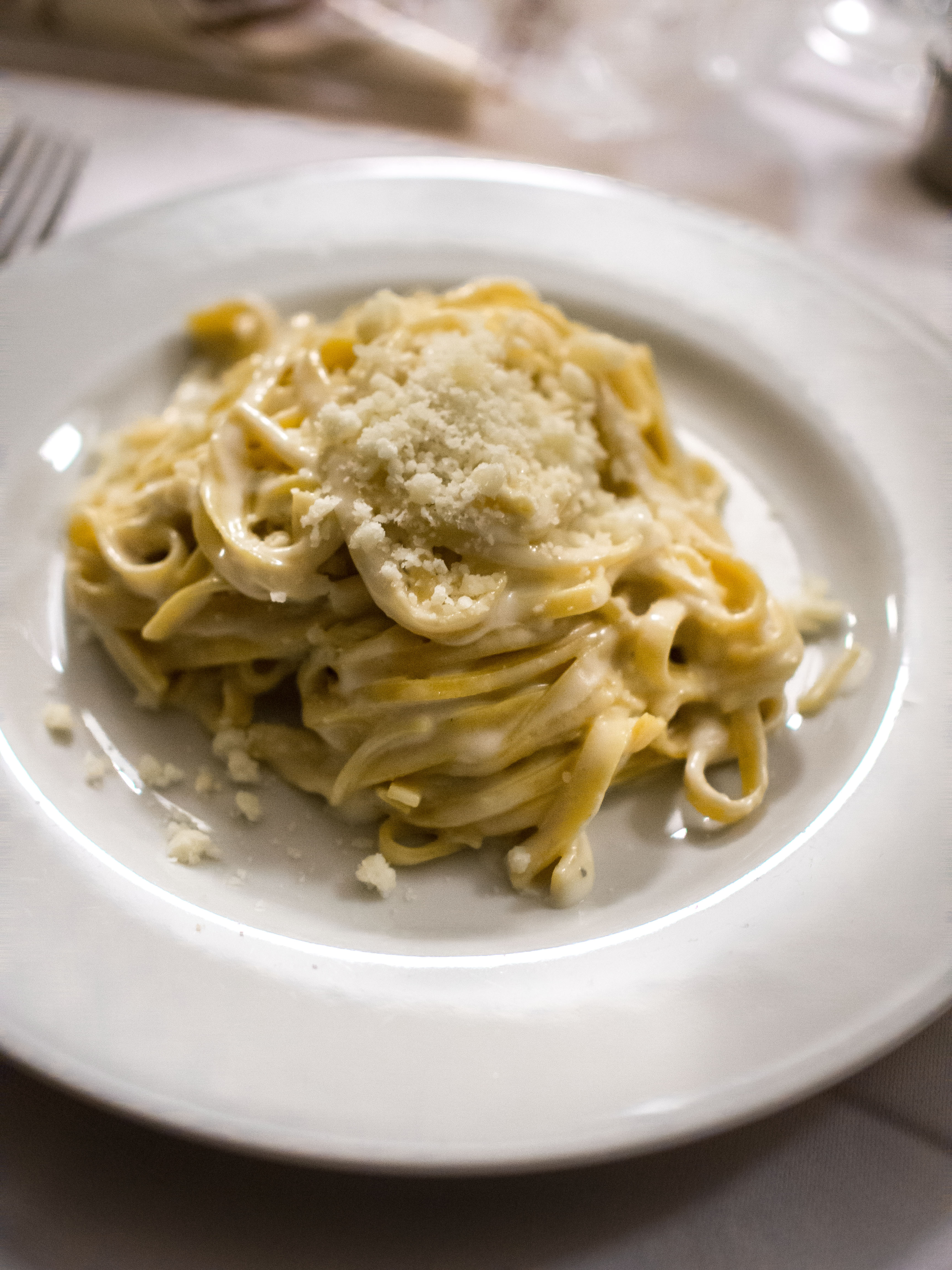
- Tajarin al Castelmagno
- Alternative names: Tagliarini, tajarin
- Type: Pasta
- Place of origin: Italy
- Region or state: Piedmont

Tagliolini (Italian: [taʎʎoˈliːni]) is a type of ribbon pasta, long like spaghetti, roughly 2–3 mm (3/32–1/8 in) wide, cut from a sheet of dough similar to tagliatelle, but thin like capellini. It is a traditional recipe in the Molise and Piedmont regions of Italy. In Piedmont it is called tajarin and made of egg dough (pasta all'uovo). The dough also contains semolina, flour and salt. It is typically served with butter and truffles (tajarin ai tartufi) or sugo d'arrosto, a sauce made from the drippings of roast meat. Tagliolini have a short cooking time, especially when made from fresh dough, and work best with light sauces, fish, delicacies or soups.

The word tagliolini is a diminutive of tagliare, which means 'to cut'.

== Variations ==
- Tagliolini al limone (with lemon)
- Tagliolini di Campobasso (prepared as usual in the town of Campobasso)
- Tagliolini alle verdure (with vegetables)
- Tajarin albesi (prepared as usual in the town of Alba, Piedmont)
- Tagliolini con il sugo di arrosto (in meat roast sauce)
- Tajarin al tartufo
- Tajarin con sugo di carne e fegatini (tagliolini in meat sauce and liver)
- Tajarin al ragù di salsiccia

== See also ==
- Piedmontese cuisine
- List of pasta
