= Bagna càuda =

Piedmontese hot dish

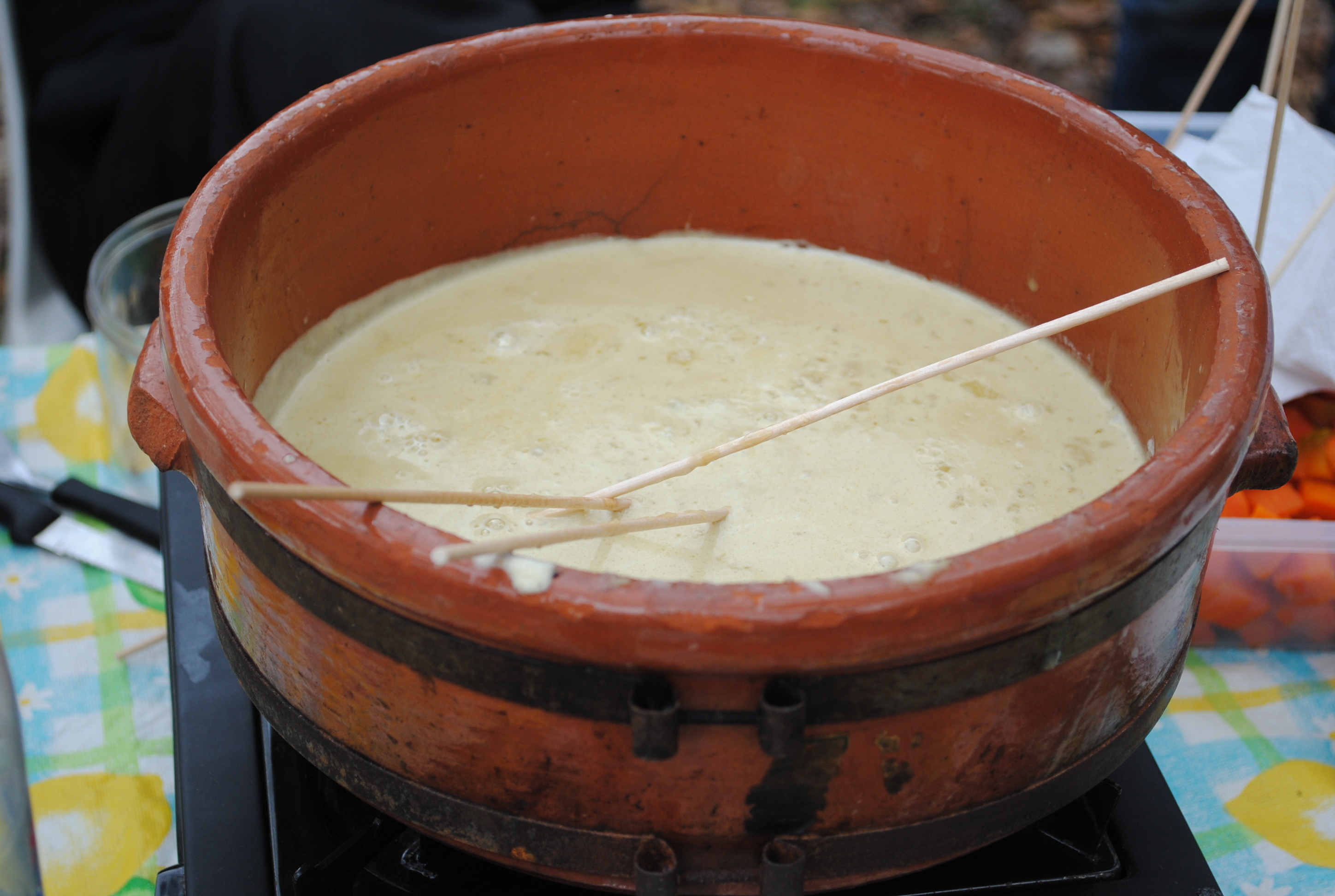
- Bagna càuda is kept hot by a small heat source below the dish.
- Alternative names: Bagna caouda (in Alpes-Maritimes)
- Type: Dipping sauce
- Place of origin: Italy
- Region or state: Lower Piedmont, Piedmont
- Main ingredients: Garlic, anchovies, red wine, extra virgin olive oil

Bagna càuda (Piedmontese: [ˈbɑɲa ˈkɑʊ̯da]; lit. 'hot dip' or 'hot gravy'), also spelled bagna caouda in Alpes-Maritimes, is a hot dish made with garlic, anchovies, red wine, and extra virgin olive oil, typical of Lower Piedmont, a geographical region of Piedmont, Italy, and Provence, France. The dish is served and consumed in a manner similar to fondue, sometimes as an appetizer, with raw or cooked vegetables typically used to dip into it. Pinzimonio is a similar Italian dipping sauce.

== Overview ==
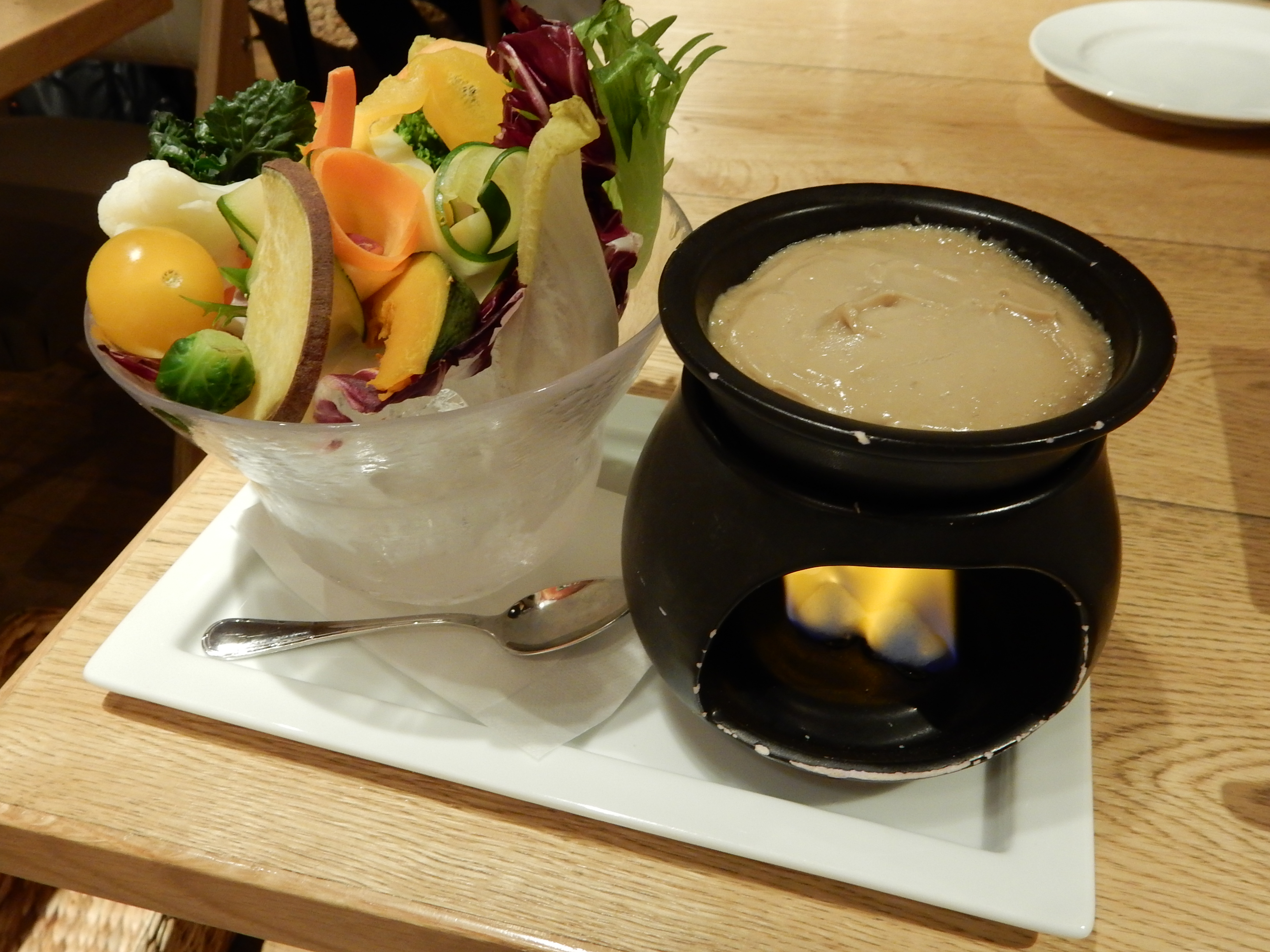
A preparation of bagna càuda

Bagna càuda is a hot dish and dipping sauce in Piedmontese and Provençal cuisine, used to dip vegetables in. It is prepared using olive oil, chopped anchovies, and garlic. Additional ingredients sometimes used include truffle and salt. Raw or cooked vegetables are dipped into the sauce, which is typically kept hot on a serving table using a heat source such as a candle or burner.

Cardoon (edible thistle) is often dipped in the sauce. Additional foods used to dip into it include cabbage, celery, carrot, Jerusalem artichoke, pepper, fennel, and bread. It is sometimes served as an appetizer.

In the past, walnut oil or hazelnut oil would have been used. Sometimes, truffles are used in versions around the Italian comune (municipality) of Alba, in the Piedmont region. It is traditionally eaten during the autumn and winter months, particularly at Christmas and New Year's, and must be served hot, as the name suggests.

=== Consumption in North and South America ===
It is also a popular winter dish in central Argentina and prevalent in Clinton, Indiana; Rock Springs, Wyoming; Coal City, Morris, and Benld, Illinois; as there were many northern Italian immigrants to those places. Bagna càuda was also prepared in the coal-mining community of Madison County, Illinois (including Collinsville, Edwardsville, and Maryville), due to the numerous Italian immigrants that came there to work in the mines.

== History ==
Bagna càuda has been a part of Piedmontese cuisine since the 16th century. The recipe is typical of Lower Piedmont, a geographical region of Piedmont, Italy, as in past centuries in that area it was very easy to obtain the salted anchovy, the fundamental ingredient, still used today in many typical Piedmontese recipes, especially among appetizers, for example, anciove al bagnet verd or al bagnet ross. Ancient Piedmont obtained its salt from the saline of Provence and the mouths of the Rhône, through a series of commercial routes crossing the passes of the Maritime Alps and known as "salt roads"; in fact at the time Nice and its surroundings were Savoyard territory. Legend has it that the trade in salted anchovies was a way to trade salt, thus avoiding paying the high duties: tubs full of salt presented a layer of salted anchovies in the upper part to the control of the tax collectors. In reality, throughout the Piedmont of the old regime, the salt gabelle was a compulsory tax and not linked to consumption. Not only that, salted anchovies were much more expensive and their price was sustainable only in relation to the modest purchase quantities. The "anchovy seller" (ancióaire in Piedmontese language) was the itinerant merchant who with the typical cart pulled by horses or oxen brought the anchovies in barrels and wooden casks.

Bagna càuda was rejected for a long time by the wealthier classes, who considered it a coarse food and unsuitable for a refined diet, in particular, due to the presence of garlic and the effects of its intake on the breath, where it remains for a considerable time (in some cases even up to twenty-four hours). For this reason, written information about this dish is rather rare in Piedmontese gastronomic texts. The first detailed description of bagna càuda in its current version is due to Roberto Sacchetti and dates back to 1875.

== See also ==
Media related to Bagna càuda at Wikimedia Commons The dictionary definition of bagna càuda at Wiktionary

- Piedmontese cuisine
- List of dips
- List of garlic dishes
- List of hors d'oeuvre
