= Breadstick =

Italian bread

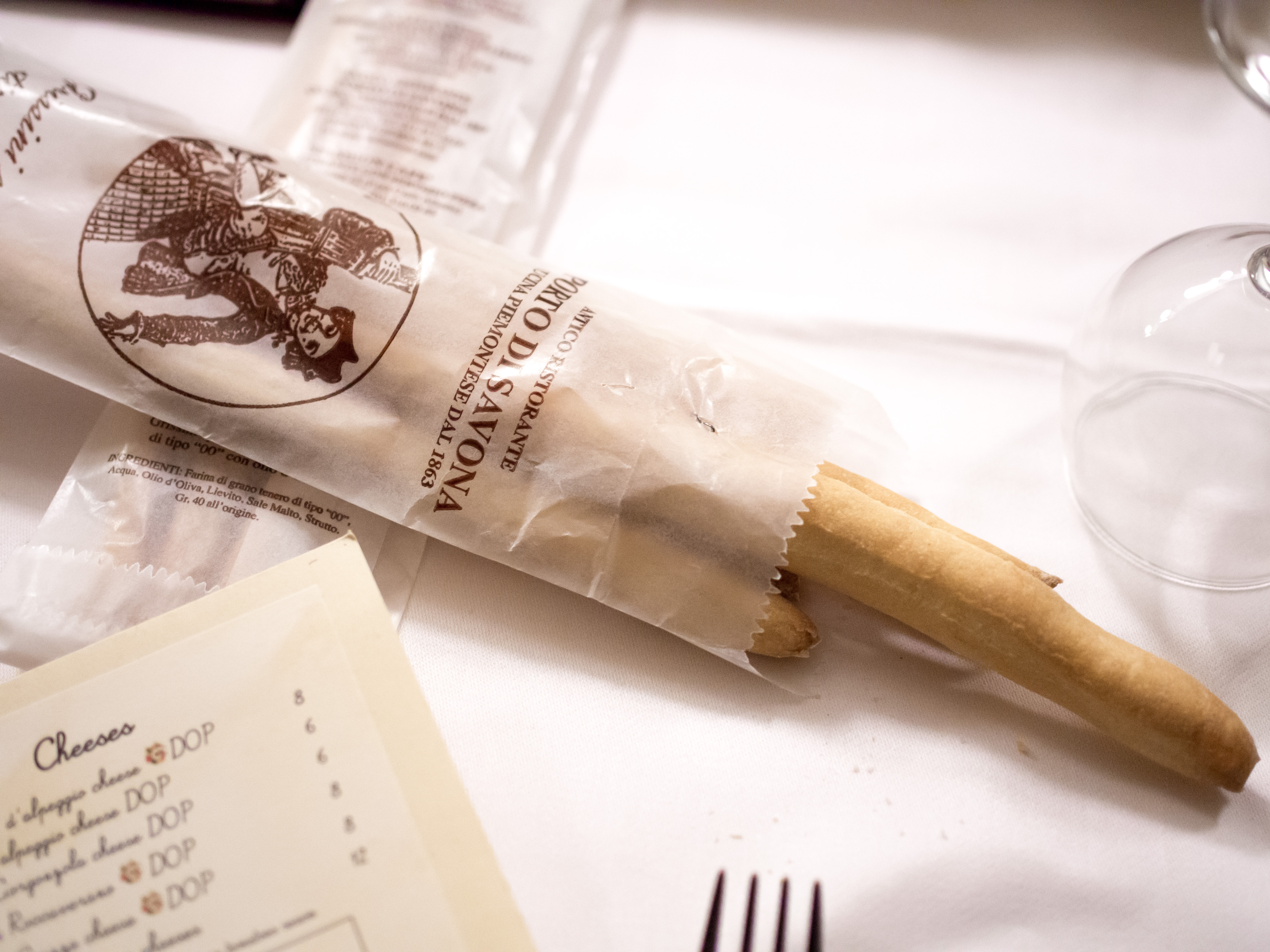
- Grissini in a restaurant in Turin
- Alternative names: Grissini, grissini torinesi
- Type: Bread
- Place of origin: Italy
- Region or state: Turin, Piedmont
- Associated cuisine: Italian (Piedmontese)
- Created by: Antonio Brunero (traditionally)
- Main ingredients: Flour, water, yeast

Breadsticks, also known as grissini (Italian: [ɡrisˈsiːni]; sing.: grissino; Piedmontese: ghërsin [ɡərˈsiŋ]) or grissini torinesi, are generally pencil-sized sticks of crisp, dry baked bread that originated in the Italian city of Turin, Piedmont.

== History ==
It is believed that the breadstick originated before 1643, when a Florentine abbot described a long-shaped and "bone-thin" bread being made in Lanzo Torinese, a town outside of Turin, in the current region of Piedmont. Tradition states that it originated in Piedmont in the 17th century, invented by a Turinese baker called Antonio Brunero. It was a food that was intended to be easier to digest for the Duke Victor Amadeus II of Savoy, who had digestive problems in his childhood.

== Serving ==
In Italian restaurants, breadsticks are often offered as an appetizer (antipasto), especially in their traditional shape, together with or replacing bread, which is commonly provided with all meals. They may also be combined with ingredients such as prosciutto. This appears to be the case with restaurants in the United States as well; in some instances or regions, they may be a type that is larger than pencil-sized, as well as soft instead of hard.

In many North American restaurants, notably Olive Garden, breadsticks are soft, frequently topped with butter, garlic, and cheese when served as appetizers; as a dessert item, they can be topped with cinnamon, sugar, and icing.

Pre-made, dried breadsticks can be found being sold in markets as a quick snack or a pre-meal appetizer for home use, somewhat similar to a cracker. In Italy they are often consumed as a snack on their own, but in the United States they are usually served with a dip of some sort, such as cheese.

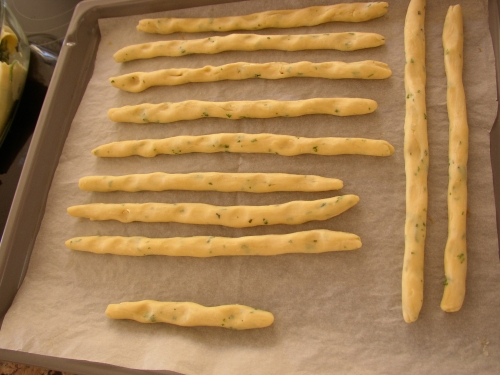
Unbaked home-made grissini on a baking tray, seasoned with herbs

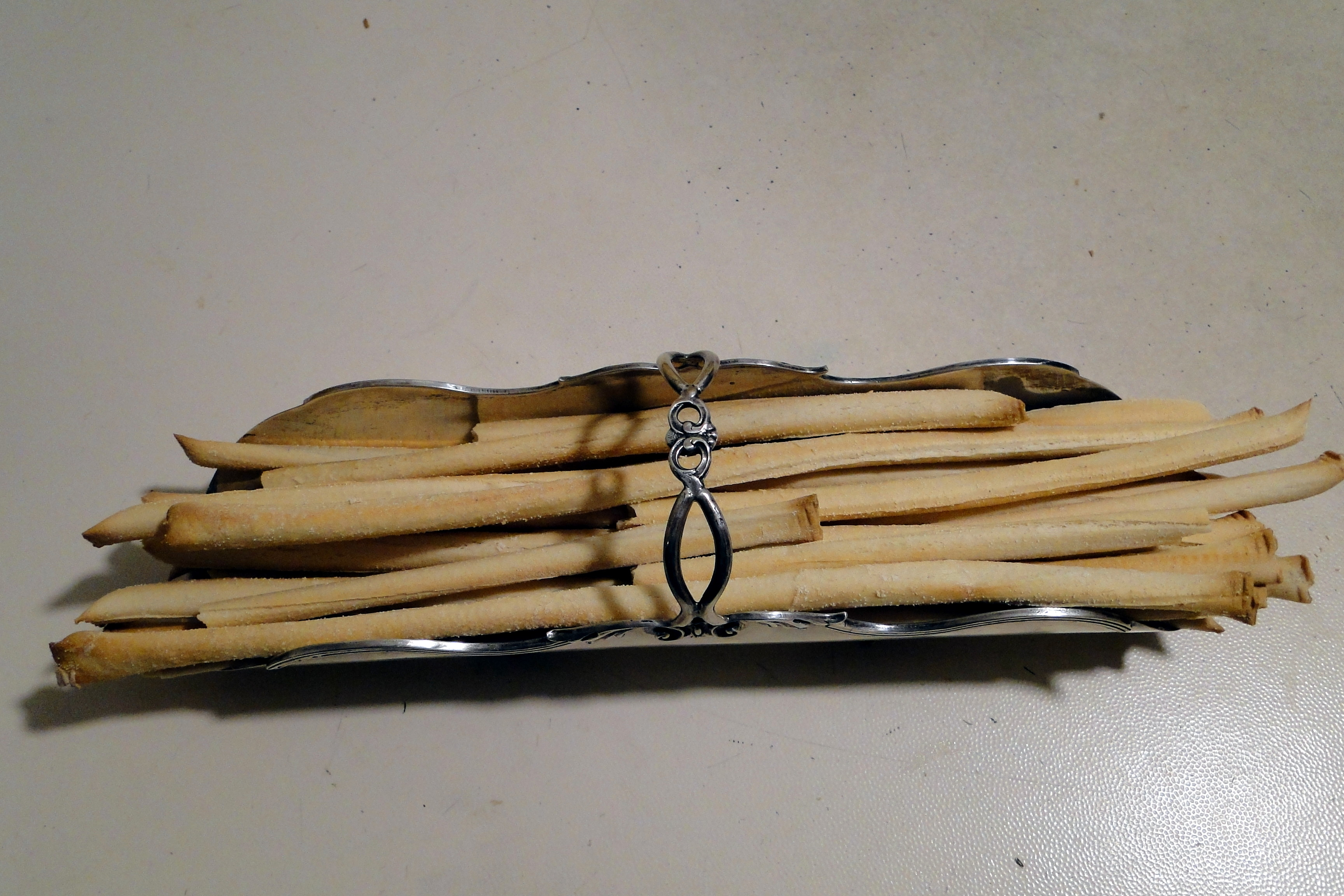
Grissini in the proper case to be served at table
