= Motsetta =

Lean cold cut originating from the Aosta Valley, Italy

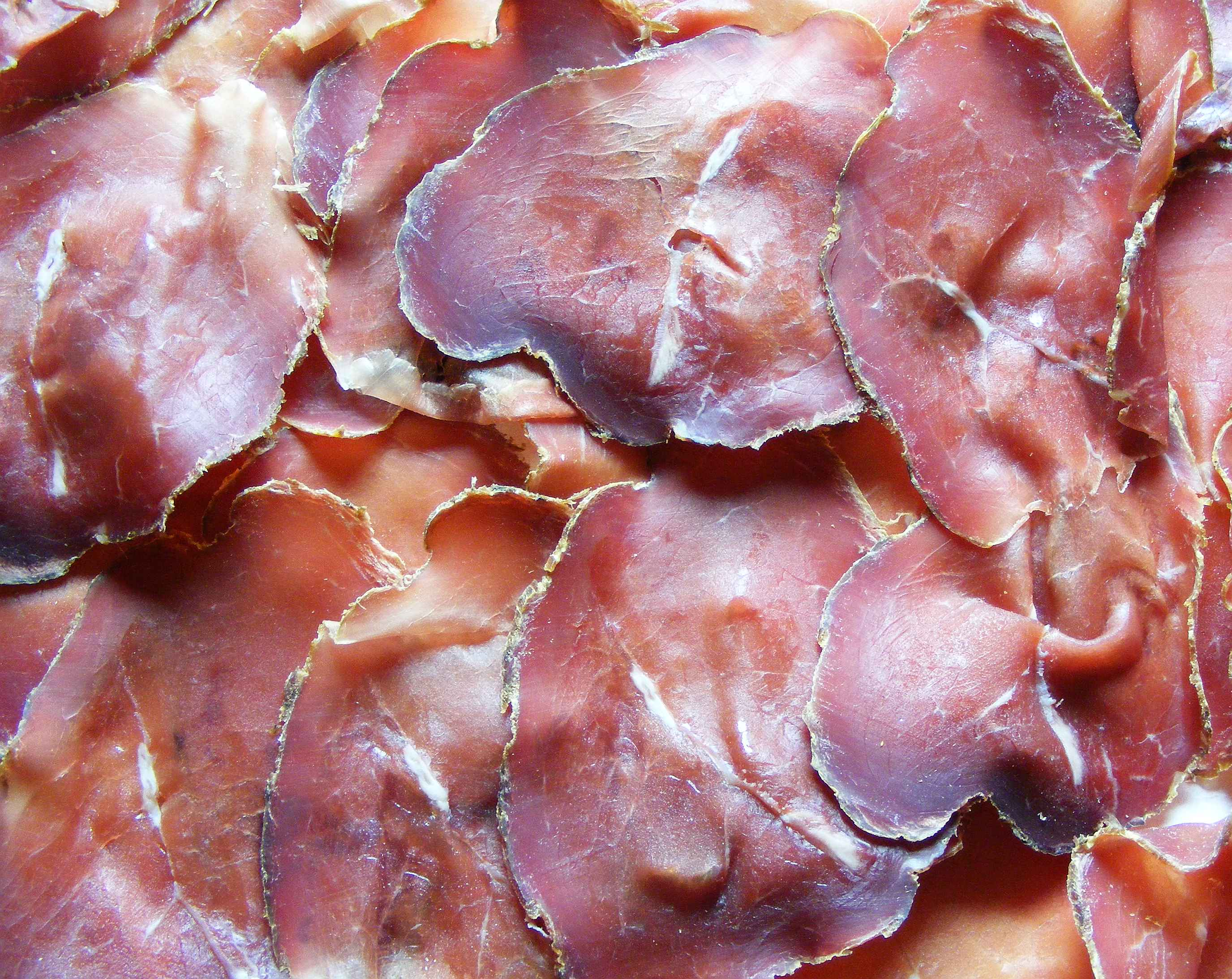
- Thinly cut motsetta
- Alternative names: Motzetta, mocetta
- Course: Cold cut
- Place of origin: Italy
- Region or state: Aosta Valley; Piedmont
- Serving temperature: Cool or room temperature
- Main ingredients: Beef, spices
- Variations: Mutton, goat, pork, game meat, chamois, Alpine ibex

Motsetta, motzetta or mocetta is a flavored cold cut dried meat traditionally consumed in the Western Alps. It is recognised as a prodotto agroalimentare tradizionale (PAT).

Motsetta is produced throughout the Aosta Valley as well as the northern part of Piedmont (namely in Canavese, Valsesia and Val d'Ossola). The cold cut derives from lean cuts of meat, mainly muscle or thigh. The meat can be bovine, or sheep, goat, pork or game, among the latter the chamois and ibex are particularly appreciated.

== Preparation ==
The meat is flavored with garlic, bay leaf, rosemary, sage and other mountain herbs (depending on the recipe), then salted and marinated in its own juices. After being marinated the meat is left to rest in a cool place for a varying amount of time: in the case of homemade motsetta, the meat is flavoured for up to 20 days. In artisanal butcheries, the meat is massaged by machinery to maintain a homogeneous colour and safeguard the aromatic notes. Regardless of the method of preparation, the meat must then dry and mature hanging in an airy and dry room.

== Consumption ==
Motsetta can be eaten at different stages of its maturation. Younger motsetta is described to be more fresh and tender, with a higher degree of maturation the cold cut becomes harder and more robust in flavour, making the meat darker in colour as well. Motsetta is traditionally thinly sliced.

The flavour of motsetta is enhanced by pairing it with honey as well as walnut oil.

The origin of this charcuterie is ancient and stems from the need of peasant families to preserve meat during the long winter months in the Alps.

== Bibliography ==
- Ouvrage collectif. éd. Musumeci (ed.). À la découverte des produits valdôtains. De la tradition aux DOP et aux DOC. Quart. pp. 40–41. (reference)
