= Soup with risotto =

Italian-American dish

- Type: Soup
- Main ingredients: Risotto, eggs, bread crumbs, clear or brown soup

Soup with Risotto is a dish in Italian-American cuisine made with risotto, eggs, bread crumbs, and clear or brown soup. It is commonly made when one has risotto leftover after a meal. The risotto is made into little balls the size of small nuts. These are then covered in egg and bread crumbs and fried in butter. After being dried they are added to either clear or brown soup.

Similar recipes in Italy are supplì and arancini, in which the balls are made slightly larger than eggs, but are not added to soup and are instead eaten on their own.
