= Friggitoria =

Italian store selling fried food

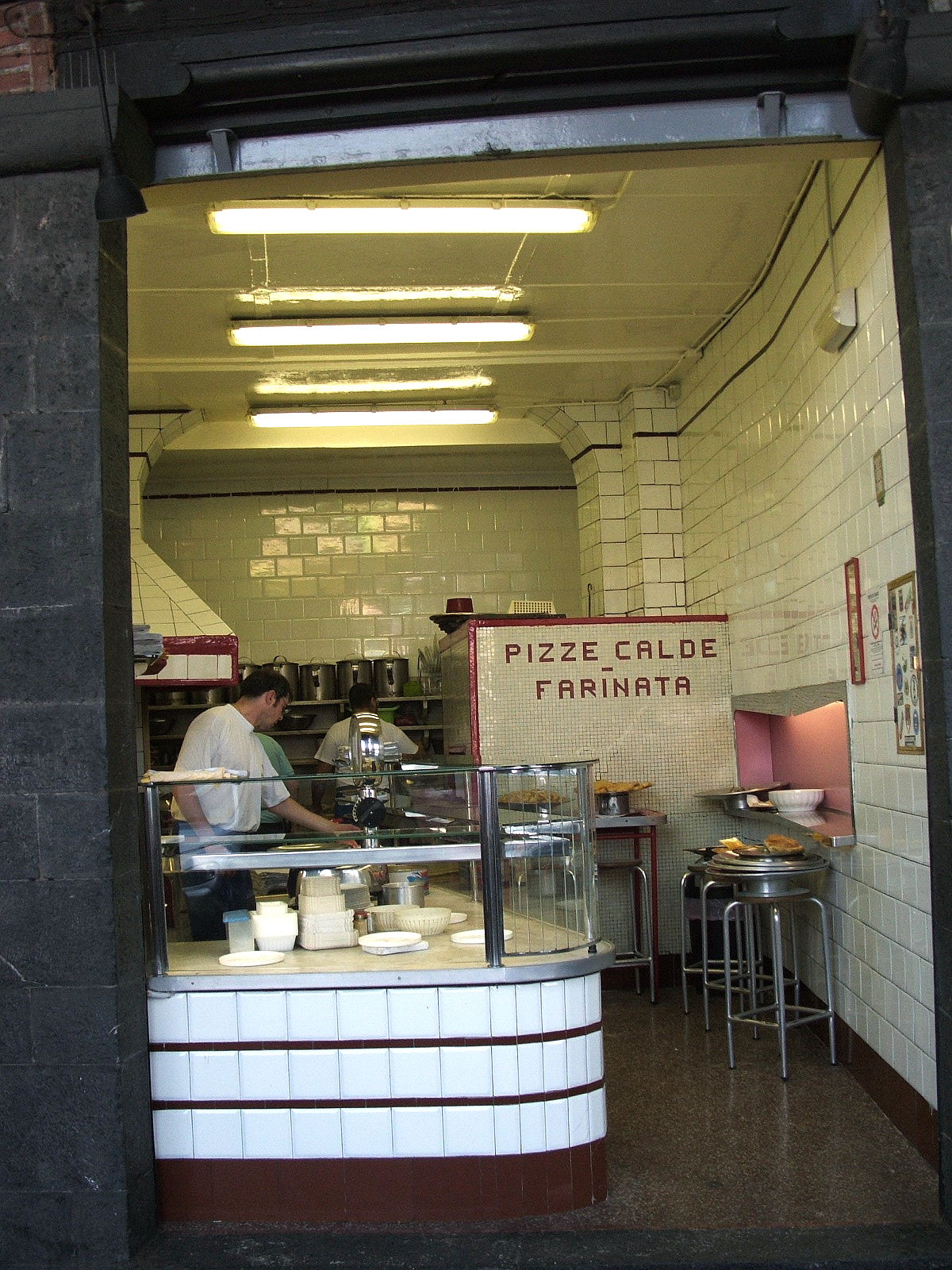
A friggitoria in Genoa which has been open since 1942

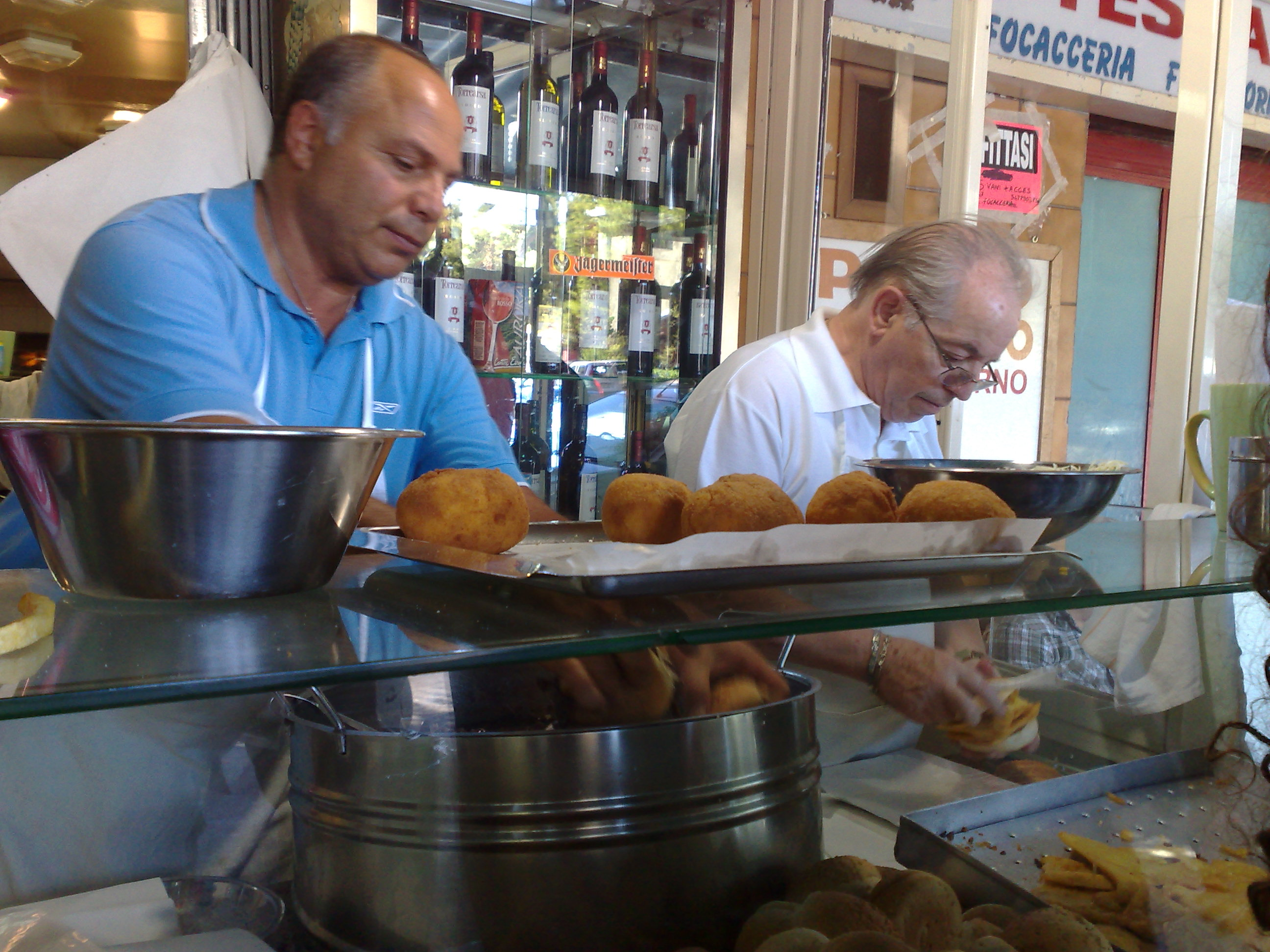
Selling panelle, arancini and pani câ meusa in Palermo

The friggitoria ("fryer" in English; pl.: friggitorie) is a shop that sells fried foods. They are found throughout Italy.

Friggitorie are common in Naples, especially in the historic center, where you can buy fried foods including pastacresciute (savory zeppole), scagliozzi (fried polenta), sciurilli (fried zucchini blossoms), fried eggplant and crocchè (potato fritters).

Outside of Naples, the friggitorie are also widespread in other areas. In Liguria, these shops were formerly common in the Sottoripa area, in front of the port of Genoa, though a few still remain, and in Palermo, where friggatore, sometimes street vendors, prepare dishes like panelle.

== Foods commonly sold at friggatorie ==
- Arancini
- Calzone
- Crocchè
- Panelle
- Panissa
- Pizza fritta
