= Supplì =

Italian snack food

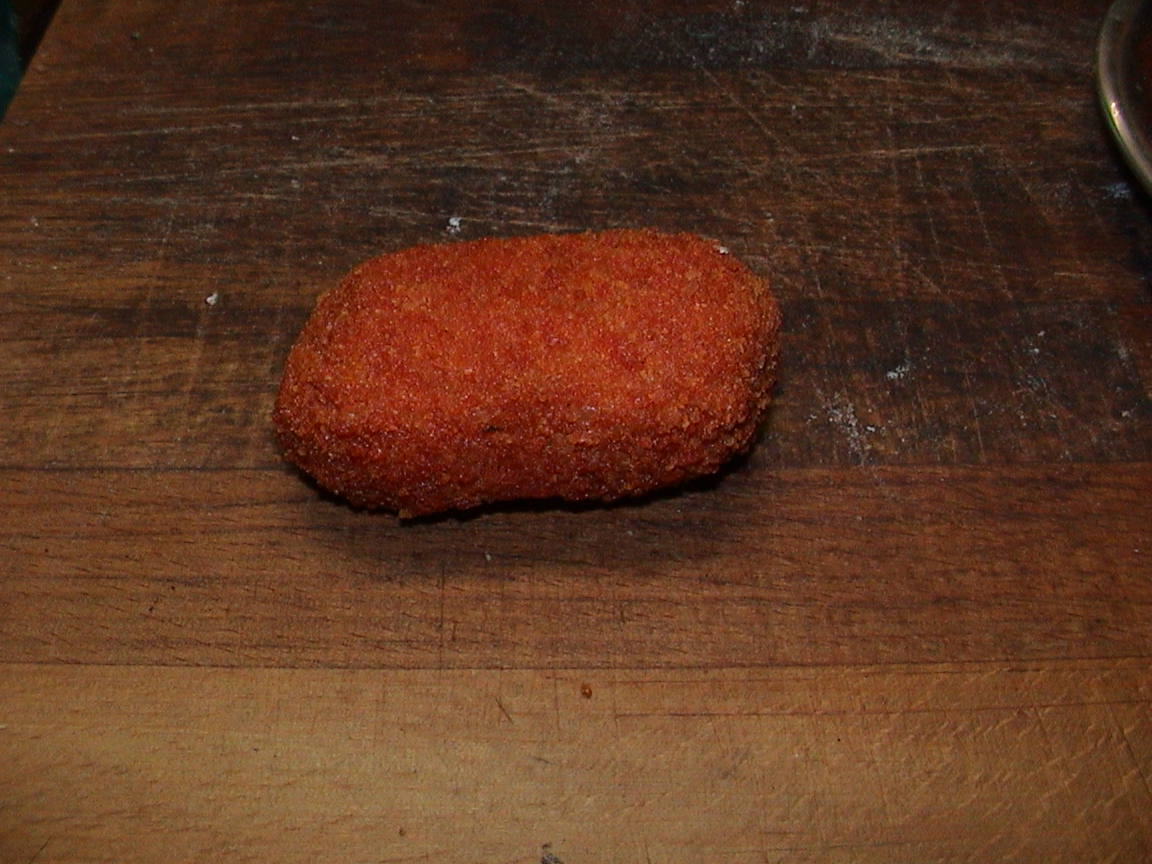
- Supplì di riso
- Type: Snack
- Place of origin: Italy
- Region or state: Lazio
- Main ingredients: Mozzarella, rice, sometimes tomato sauce, eggs, breadcrumbs

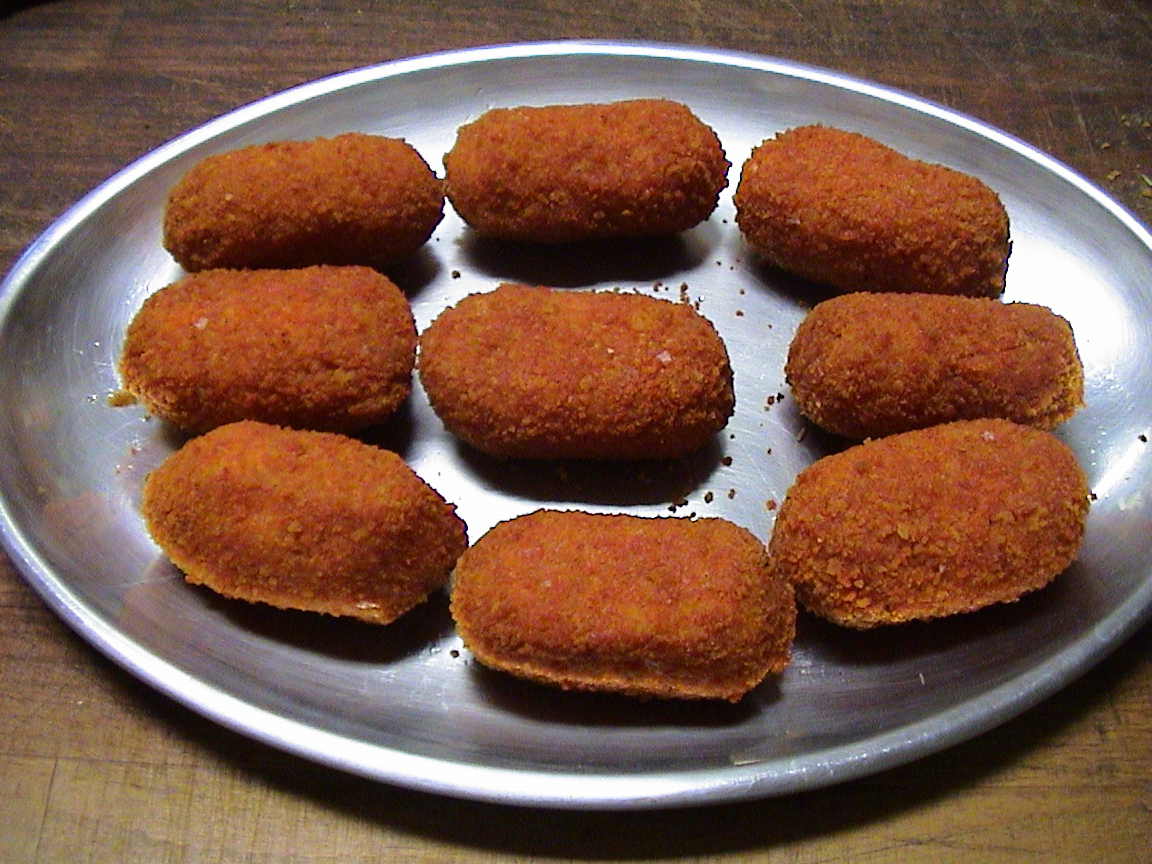
Suggestion for presentation of supplì

Supplì (Italian: [supˈpli]; Italianization of the French word surprise) are Italian snacks consisting of a ball of rice (generally risotto) with tomato sauce, typical of Roman cuisine. Some believe that they derive from the French croquettes and were introduced to Rome by the French troops of Napoleon at the beginning of the 19th century.

== Etymology ==
The name is first attested in the 19th century, and is a corruption of the term en surprise, which is used in French cuisine for all types of croquettes or pieces of meat covered with breadcrumbs.

== Description ==
Originally, they were filled with chicken giblets, mincemeat or provatura (a type of cheese from Lazio), now also with a piece of mozzarella; the whole morsel is soaked in egg, coated with breadcrumbs and then fried (usually deep fried). They are closely related to Sicilian arancini and the French croquettes, sometimes called croquettes en surprise, that can be made with rice. Supplì can be also prepared without tomato sauce (supplì in bianco, which means 'white-style supplì').

They are usually eaten with the fingers: when one is broken in two pieces, mozzarella is drawn out in a string somewhat resembling the cord connecting a telephone handset to the hook. This has led to these dishes being known as supplì al telefono ('telephone-style supplì', in reference to cables).

Supplì were originally sold at friggitorie, typical Roman shops where fried food was sold. Now they are commonly served in most pizzerias all around Italy as an antipasto.

== See also ==
Media related to Supplì at Wikimedia Commons

- Arancini
- Croquette

== Sources ==
- Boni, Ada (1983) [1930]. La Cucina Romana [Roman Cuisine] (in Italian). Rome: Newton Compton Editori.
- Carnacina, Luigi; Buonassisi, Vincenzo (1975). Roma in Cucina [Rome in the Kitchen] (in Italian). Milan: Giunti Martello.
