= McKroket =

McDonald's product in the Netherlands

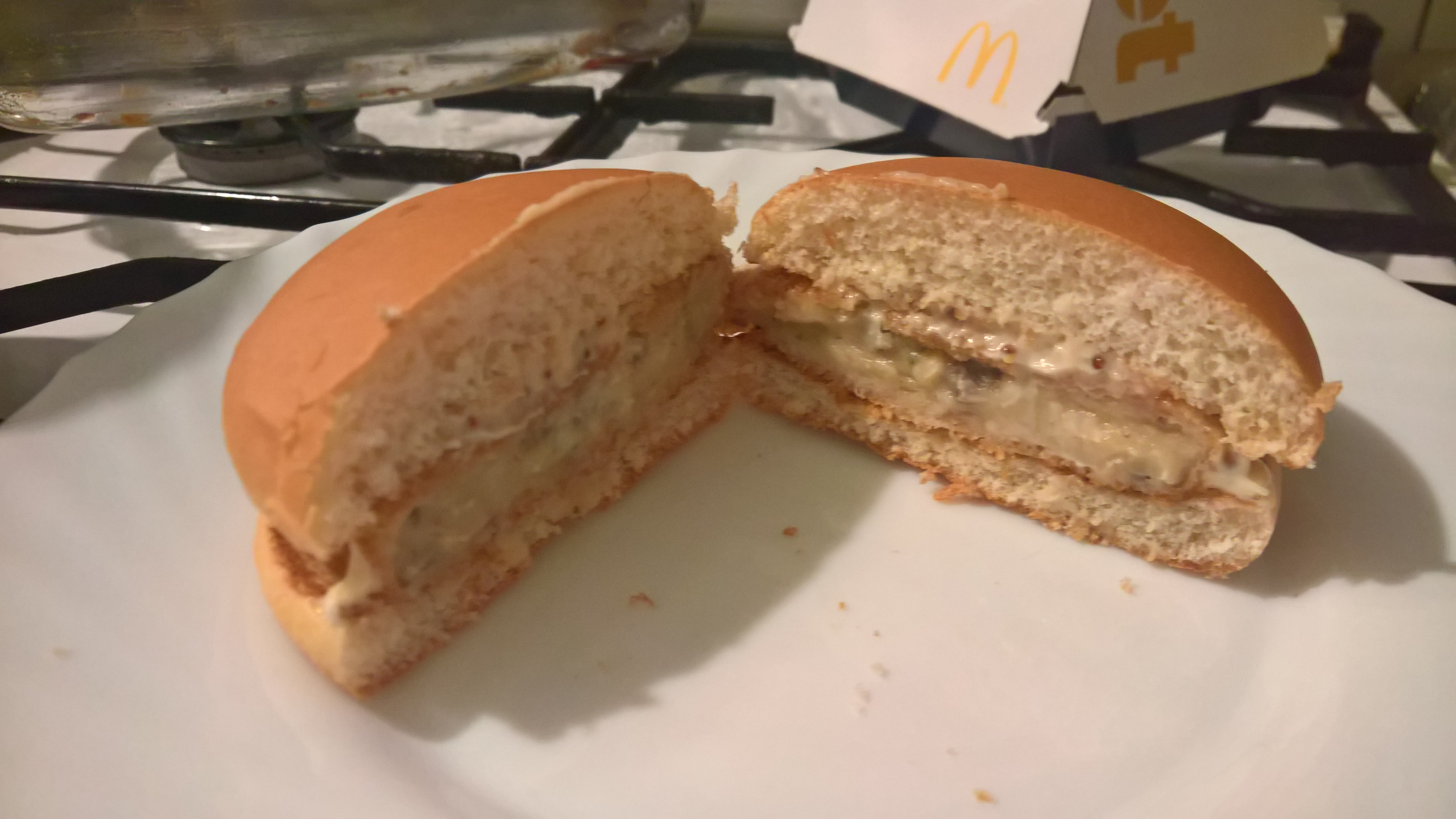
- Original McKroket (pictured in 2017)
- Inventor: Han Reekers
- Manufacturer: McDonald's
- Website: McKroket at McDonalds.com

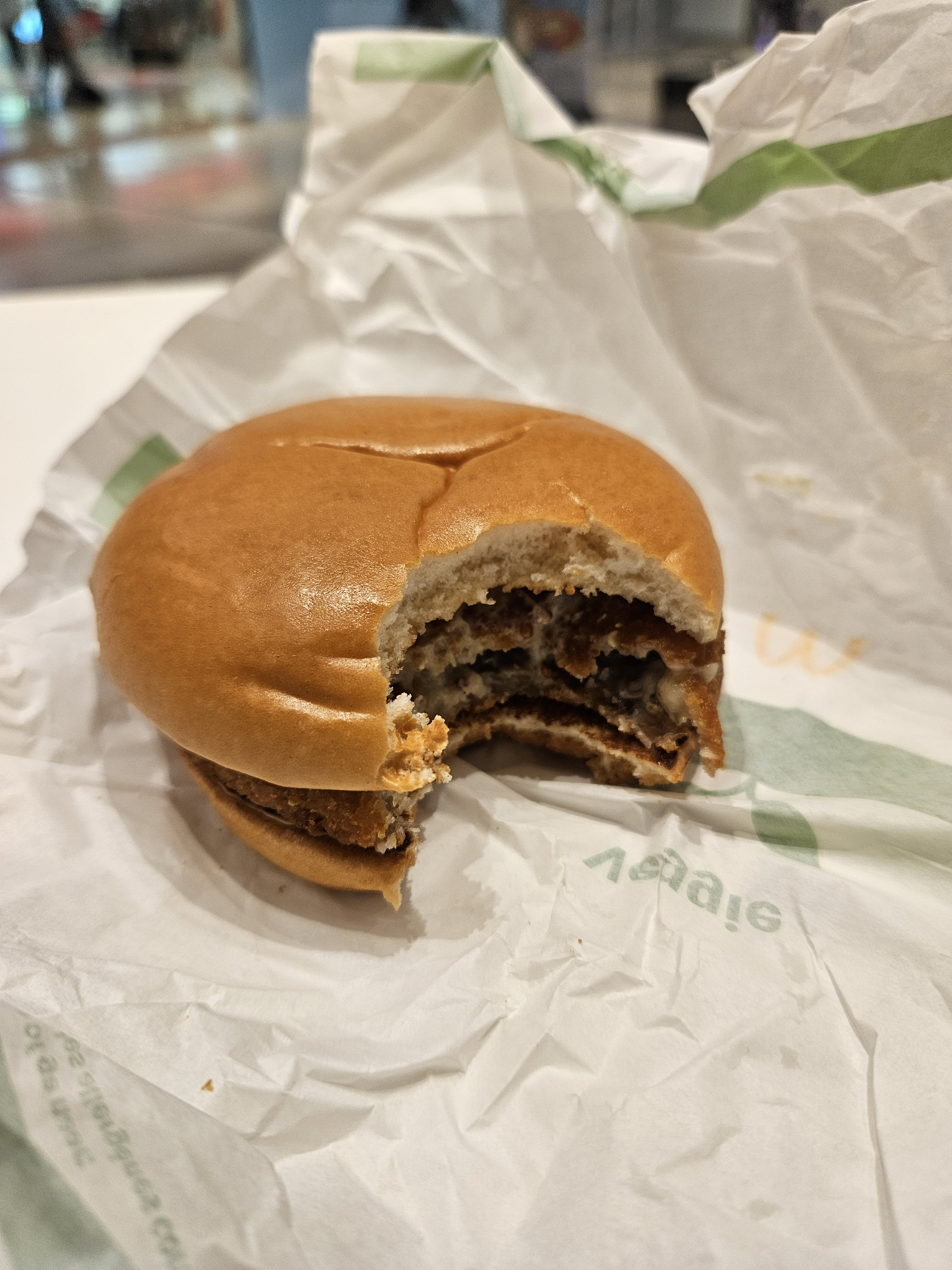
Vegetarian variant of the McKroket

The McKroket is a product by McDonald's that is exclusively available in the Netherlands and Curaçao. It consists of a bun with a kroket and a mustard-based sauce. It is available in a meat and a vegetarian variant.

== History ==
The McKroket was originally introduced when McDonald's opened its first restaurant in the Netherlands. The product was discontinued after a few years. In February 1999, the McKroket was reintroduced.

In 2023 McDonald's discontinued the meat variant, leaving only the vegetarian McKroket available. This resulted in customer complaints. The original meat variant was later reintroduced. In 2024, McDonald's introduced a McKroket menu.
