= Bitterballen =

Savory Dutch meat-based snack

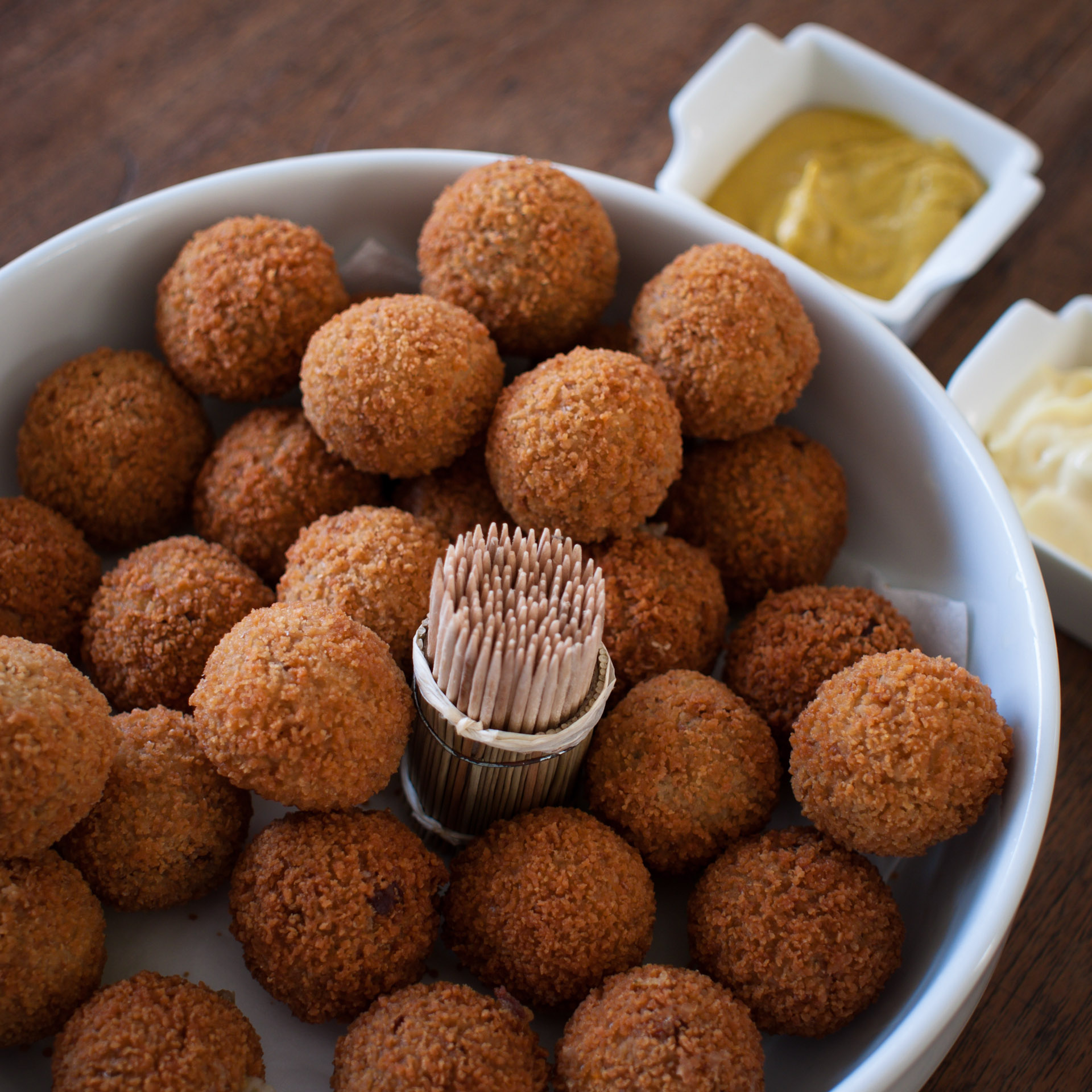
- Bitterballen are usually served with mustard.
- Course: Snack
- Place of origin: Netherlands
- Region or state: Northwestern Europe
- Serving temperature: Hot
- Main ingredients: Beef or veal (minced or chopped), beef broth, butter, flour for thickening, parsley, salt and pepper

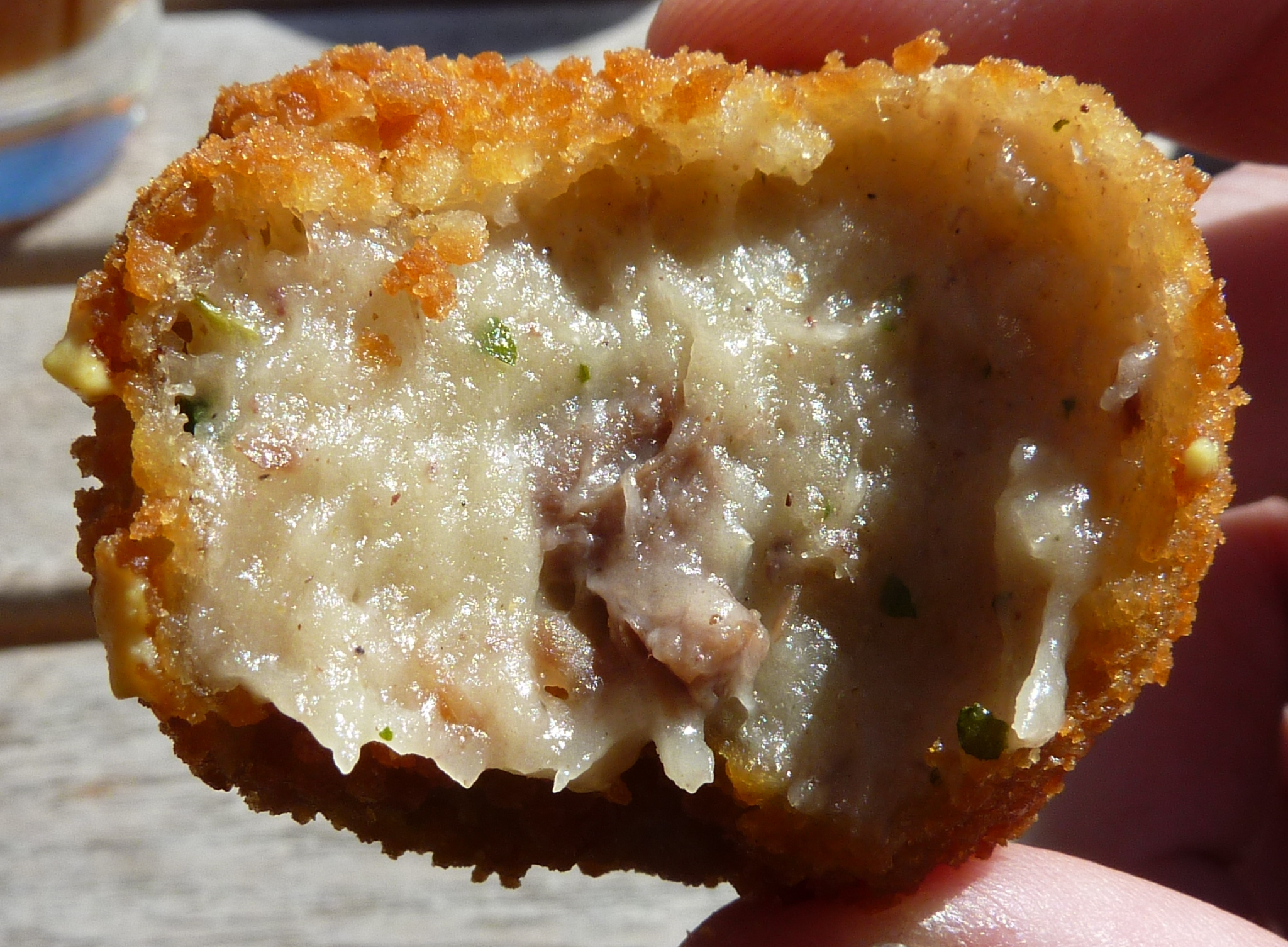
A bitterbal, showing the soft roux inside

Bitterballen (plural of bitterbal) are a Dutch meat-based snack, made by making a very thick stew thickened with roux and beef stock and loaded with meat, refrigerating the stew until it firms, and then rolling the thick mixture into balls which then get breaded and fried. Seasonings in the base stew usually include onions, salt and pepper, parsley and nutmeg.

== Origin and name ==
The bitterbal derives its name from the type of beverage that it is traditionally served with: herb-flavoured alcoholic drinks called bitters in Dutch. Bitterballen are popularly served as part of a bittergarnituur, a selection of savoury snacks to go with drinks, at pubs or at receptions in the Netherlands.

Bitterballen are very similar to the more common croquette (kroketten in Dutch) in ingredients and preparation/cooking methods, as well as flavour, though the larger kroketten have a distinct oblong sausage shape, but with a similar diameter.

== Preparation ==
The ingredients are combined and cooked, then refrigerated for the mixture to firm up. Once firm, the filling is rolled into balls roughly 3 to 4 cm in diameter, then battered in a breadcrumb and egg mixture and deep-fried. They are typically served with a ramekin or small bowl of mustard for dipping along with toothpicks. They are mostly eaten in the Netherlands, Belgium, Suriname, the Netherlands Antilles, and Bonaire, and to some degree in Indonesia.
