= Panella =

Sicilian fritter

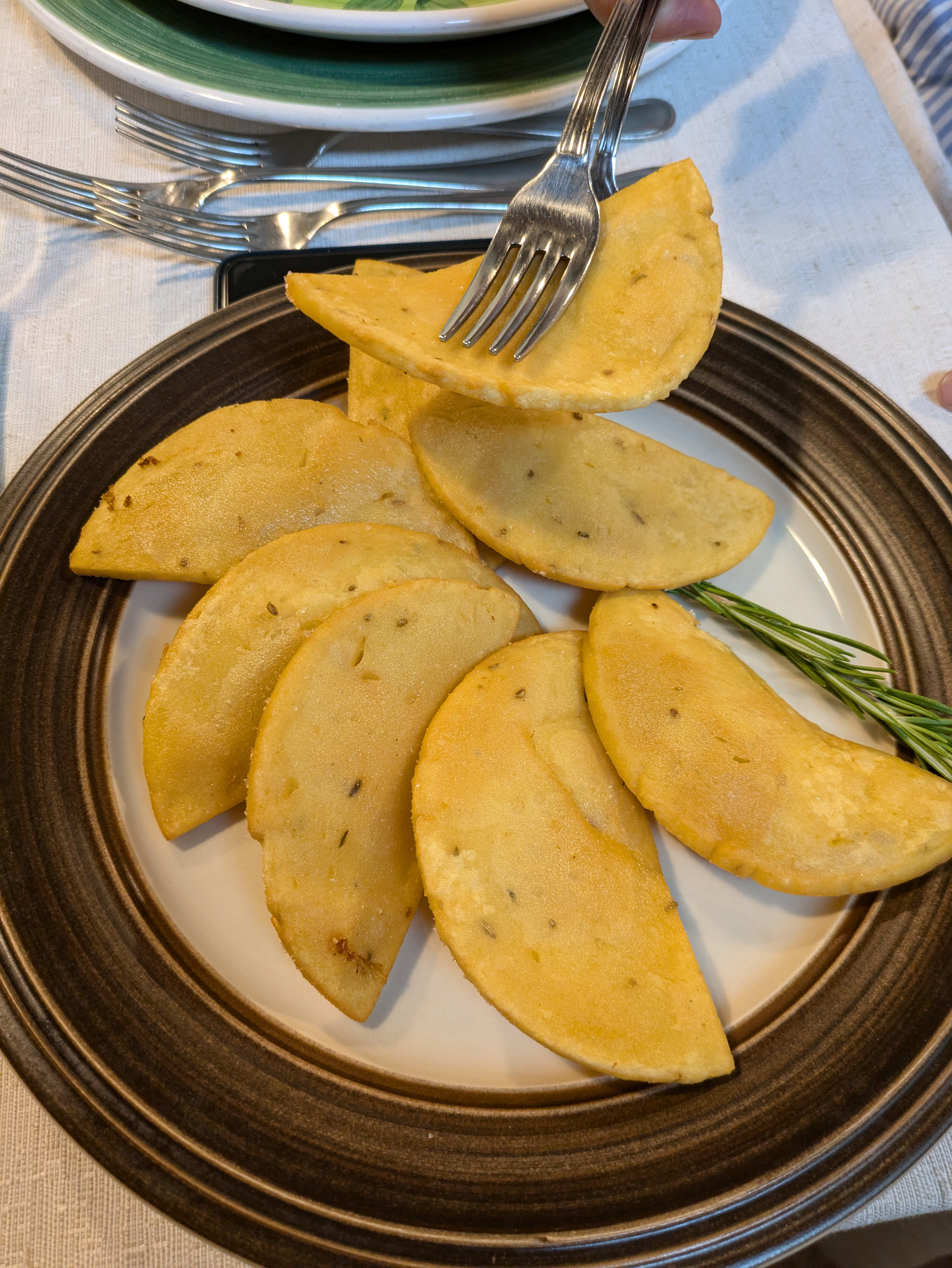
- A plate of Caltanisetta-style panelle (panelle nissene)
- Alternative names: Panelli
- Type: Fritter
- Course: Main course
- Place of origin: Italy
- Region or state: Sicily
- Associated cuisine: Sicilian
- Main ingredients: Chickpea flour, water, salt
- Ingredients generally used: Parsley, olive oil, pepper
- Variations: Pane e panelle

Panella (pl.: panelle) is a Sicilian fritter made with chickpea flour and other ingredients, usually including water, salt, pepper, olive oil, and finely chopped parsley. They are a popular street food in the city of Palermo and are often eaten between slices of bread or on a sesame roll, like a sandwich. Called pane e panelle, these sandwiches are usually served with a slice of lemon to be squeezed over panelle.

== Variations ==
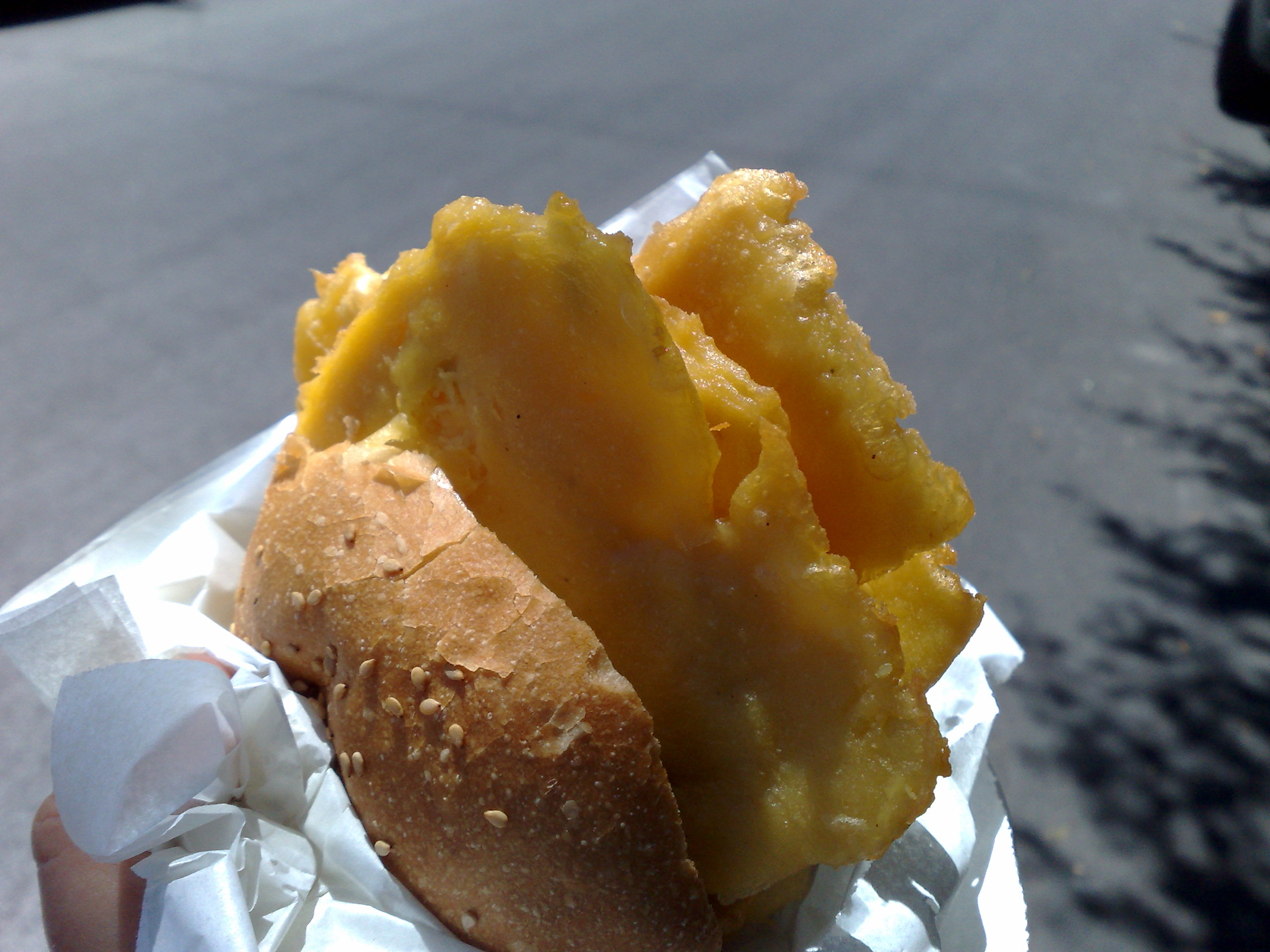
Panelle in a bread roll (pane e panelle).

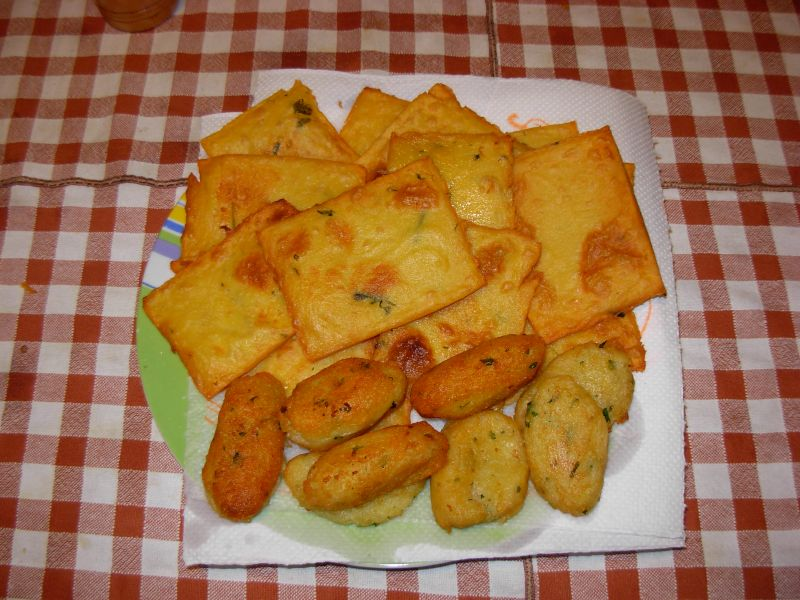
Panelle and crocchè on a platter (Panelle e cazzilli).

== See also ==
- Farinata
- Sicilian cuisine
