= Arancini =

Italian snack food

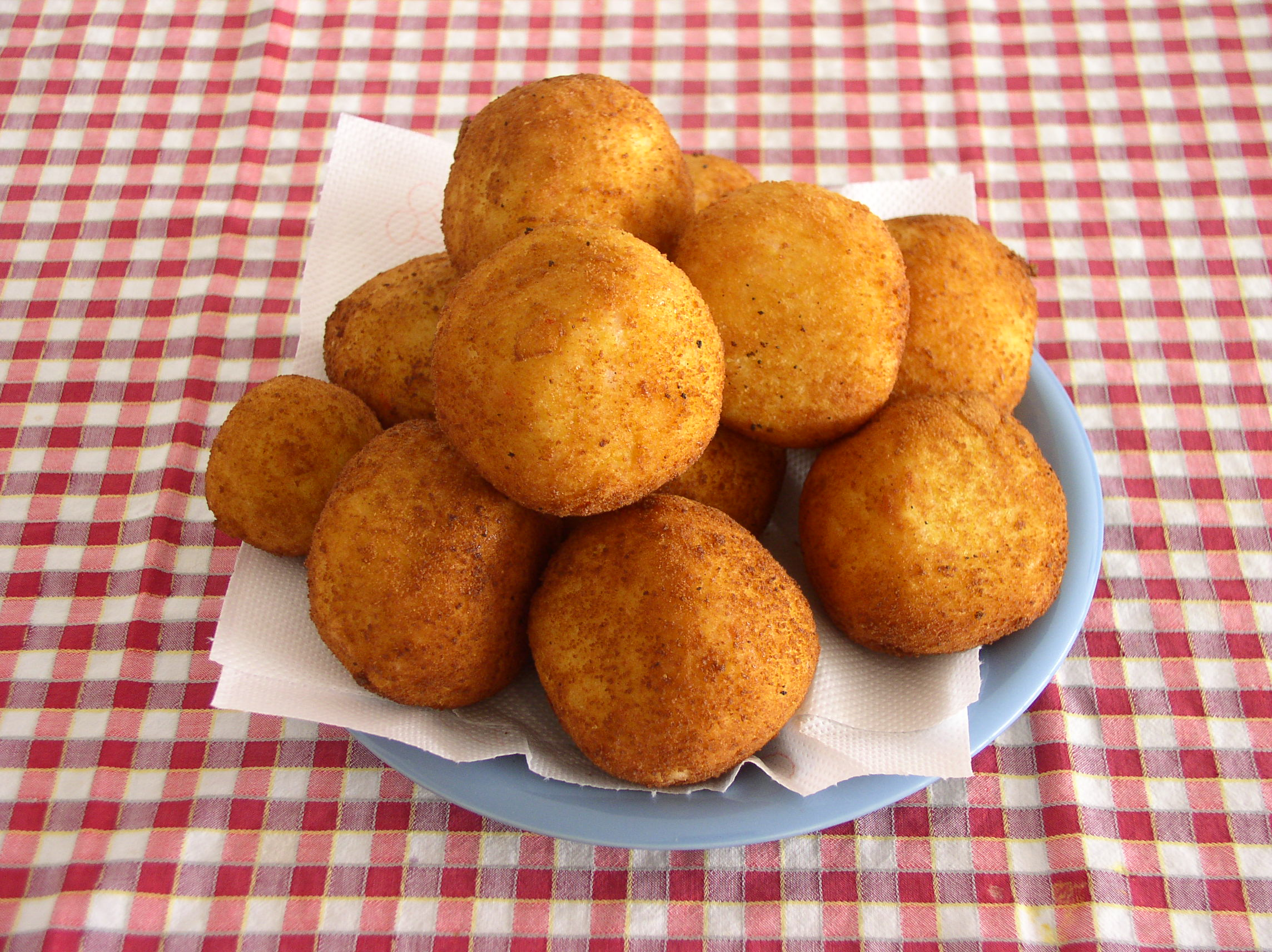
- Sicilian arancini for sale at a counter
- Alternative names: Arancino (Italian singular form), arancina (Italian singular form), arancine
- Type: Snack, street food
- Place of origin: Italy
- Region or state: Sicily
- Serving temperature: Hot or warm
- Main ingredients: Rice, ragù

Arancini, (Note: English: UK: /ˌærənˈtʃiːni/ ARR-ən-CHEE-nee, US: /ˌɑːr-/ AR-, Italian: [aranˈtʃiːni], Sicilian: [aɾanˈtʃiːnɪ, -ˈdʒiː-]; Italian sing.: arancino; Sicilian sing.: arancinu or arancina.) also known as arancine, (Note: Italian, sing.: arancina.) are Italian rice balls that are stuffed, coated with breadcrumbs and deep-fried. They are a staple of Sicilian cuisine. The most common arancini fillings are al ragù or al sugo, i.e. filled with ragù (meat or mince, slow-cooked at low temperature with tomato sauce and spices), mozzarella or caciocavallo cheese, and often peas; and al burro or ô burru (lit. 'with butter'), i.e. filled with prosciutto and mozzarella or béchamel sauce.

A number of regional variants exist which differ in their fillings and shape. Arancini al ragù produced in eastern Sicily, particularly in cities such as Catania and Messina, have a conical shape inspired by the volcano Etna.

== Etymology ==
Arancini derives from the Sicilian plural diminutive of aranciu (transl. orange), from their shape and colour which, after cooking, is reminiscent of an orange.

In Sicilian, arancini is grammatically plural. The corresponding singular is either the masculine arancinu or the feminine arancina. The eastern side of Sicily tends to use the masculine form, while the western side tends to use the feminine form.

In Italian, the masculine arancino (pl.: arancini) form has become prevalent, although the feminine form arancina (pl.: arancine) can also be used.

== History ==
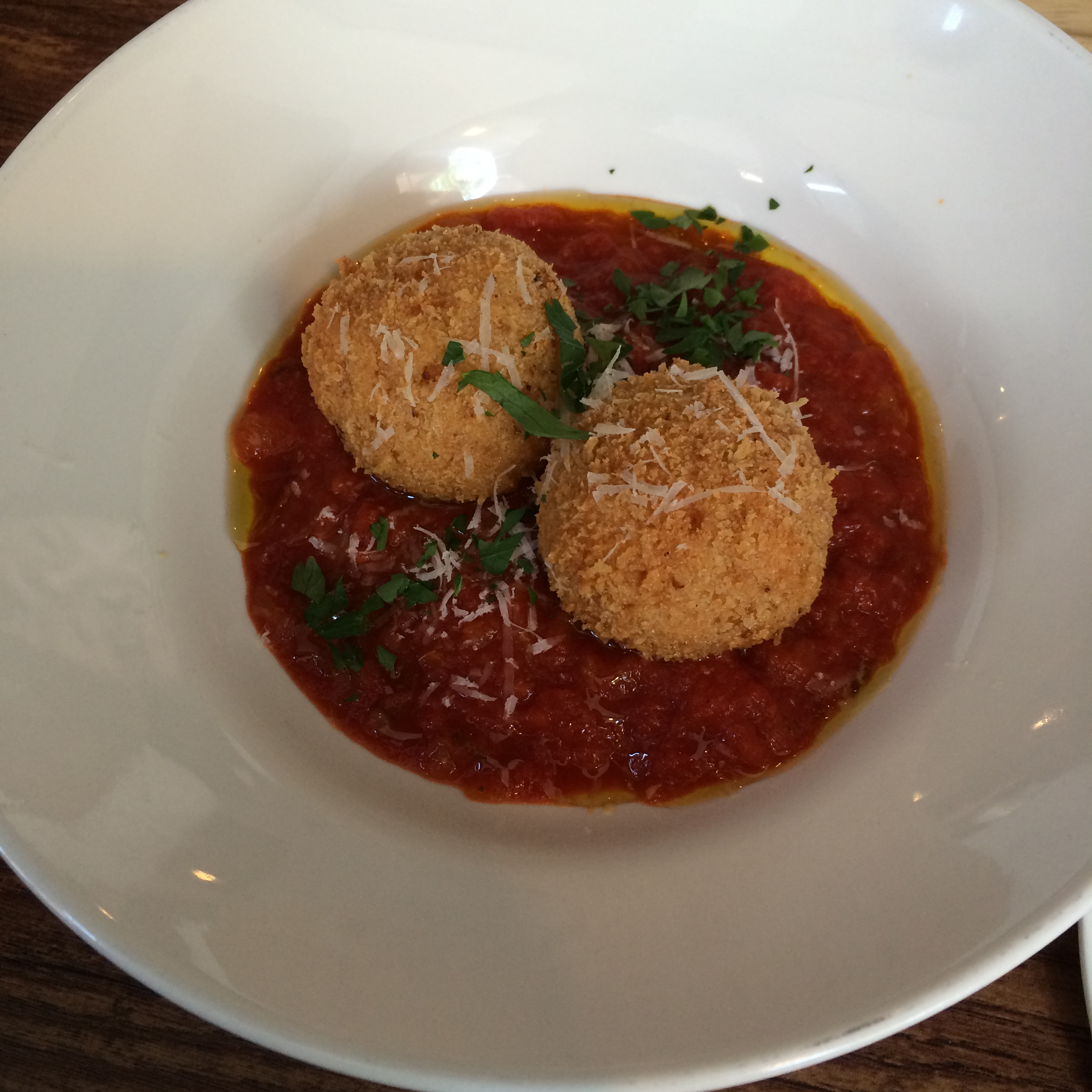
Arancini with mozzarella

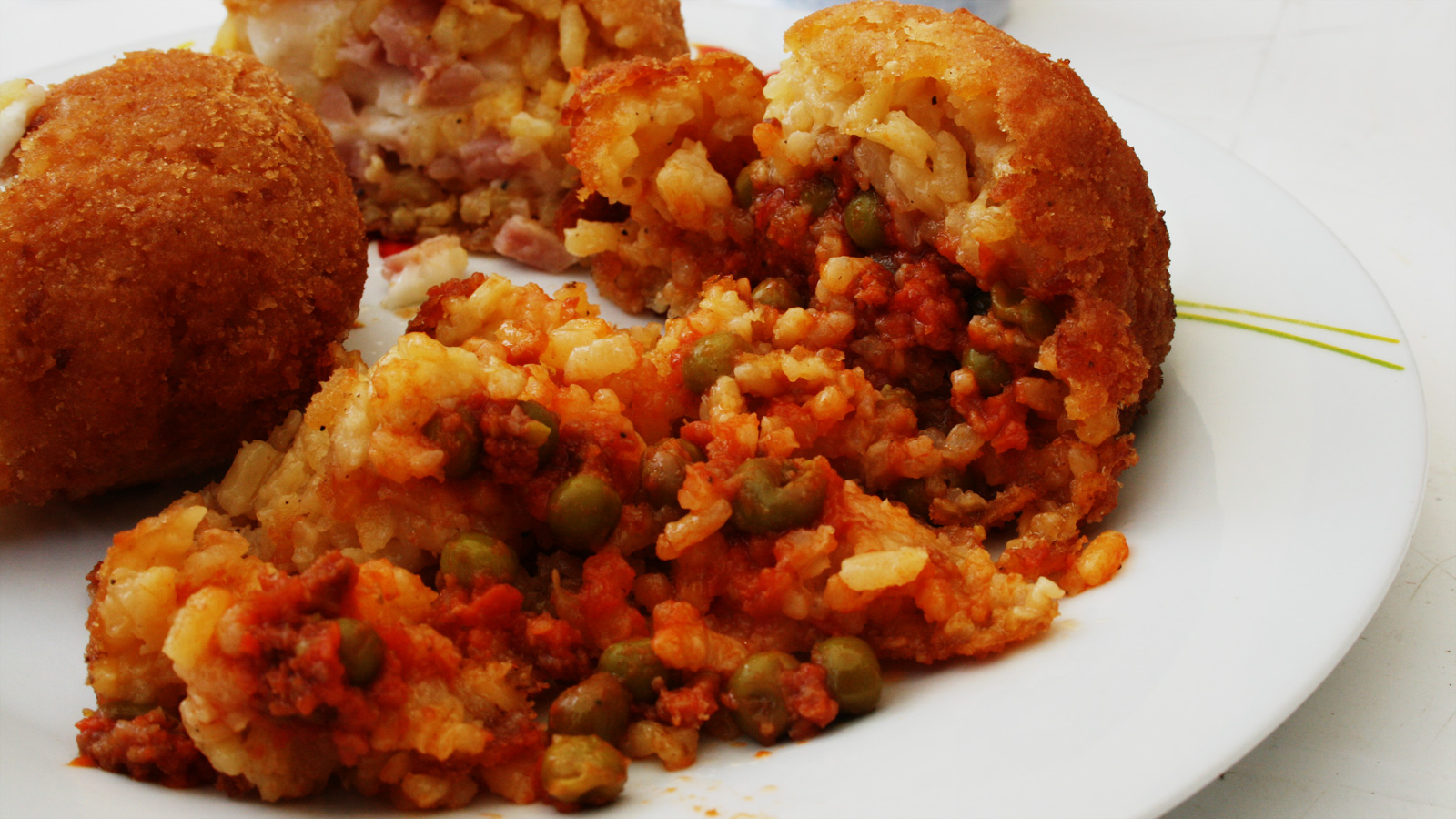
Open arancini

Arancini are said to have originated in 10th-century Sicily, at a time when the island was under Arab rule. Academic Annette Condello pinpoints arancini's origin to 18th-century southern Italy, where she says it was made to resemble oranges.

In the cities of Palermo, Syracuse, and Trapani in Sicily, arancini are a traditional food for the feast of Saint Lucy (Italian: Santa Lucia) on 13 December, when bread and pasta are not eaten. This commemorates the arrival of a grain supply ship on Saint Lucy's Day in 1646, relieving a severe famine.

Today, with the increasing popularity of this finger food in Italy, arancini are found all year round at most Sicilian food outlets. (Note: "However, as soon as any foreigner arrives in Sicily, his first encounter with the cuisine will be with rice croquettes, called "arancini". They are sold everywhere, in fry stands on the beach, in cafés, and in bars serving hot food (tavola calda).")

== Ingredients and variations ==
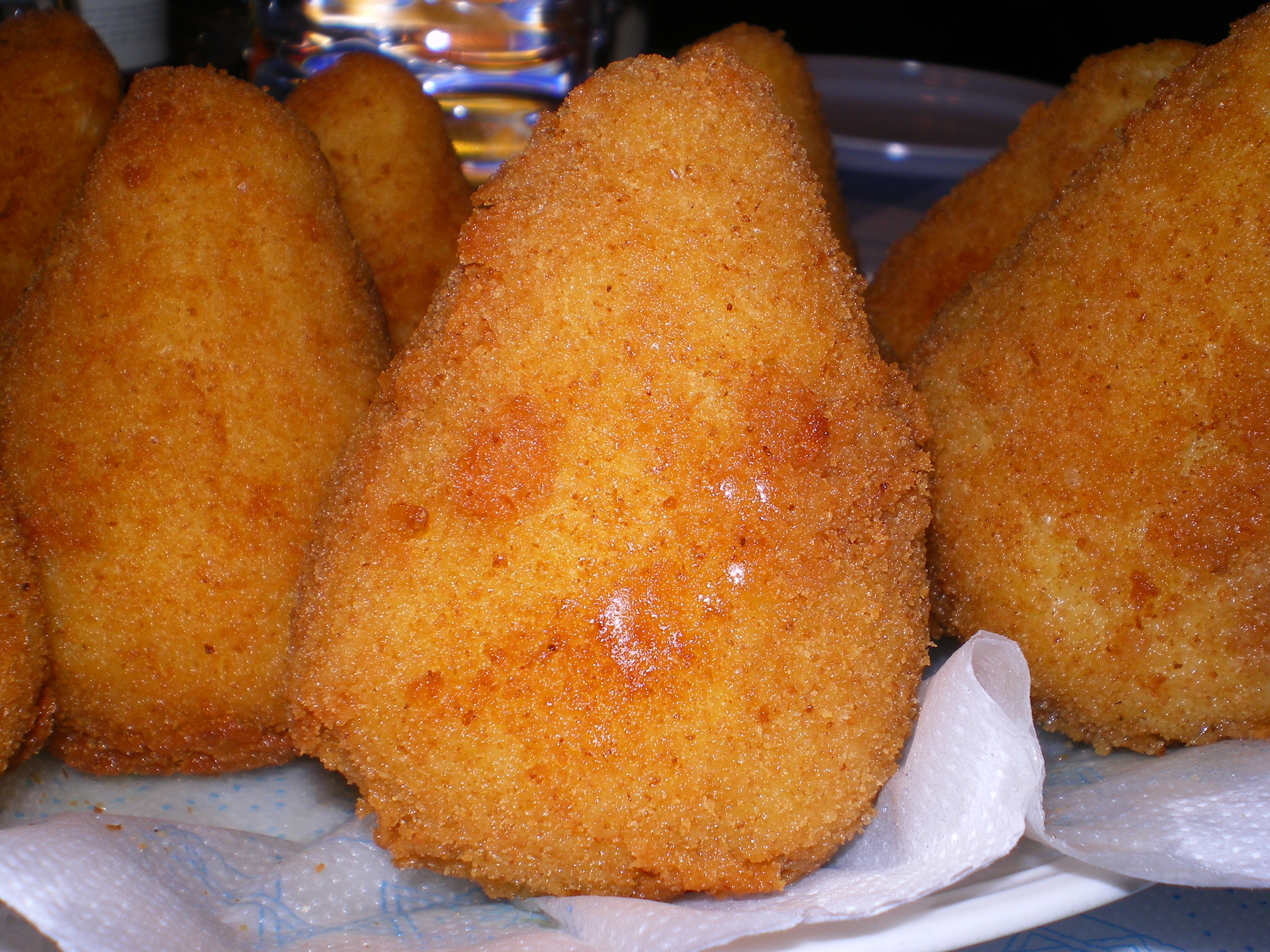
Conical-shaped arancini photographed in Messina

The most common type of arancini sold in Sicilian cafés is arancini cû sucu (transl. arancini al ragù), which typically consists of meat in a tomato sauce, rice, and mozzarella or other cheese. Many cafés also offer arancini cû burru (transl. arancini al burro, with butter or béchamel sauce) or specialty arancini, such as arancini chî funci (transl. arancini ai funghi, with mushrooms), arancini câ fastuca (transl. arancini al pistacchio, with pistachios), or arancini â norma (transl. arancini alla norma, with aubergine).

In Roman cuisine, supplì are similar, but are commonly filled with cheese (different preparation methods and filling distribution). In Naples, rice balls are called pall' 'e riso. They are smaller than Sicilian arancini, and are not necessarily filled.

== In popular culture ==
In Italian literature, Inspector Montalbano, the main character of Andrea Camilleri's detective novels, is a well-known lover of arancini—especially those made by Adelina Cirrinciò, his housekeeper and cook. The success of the book series and the television adaptation has contributed to making this dish known outside of Italy.

== See also ==
- Sicilian cuisine
- List of stuffed dishes
- Coxinha
- Pani câ meusa
- Supplì
