= Easter egg =

Decorated egg for the celebration of Easter

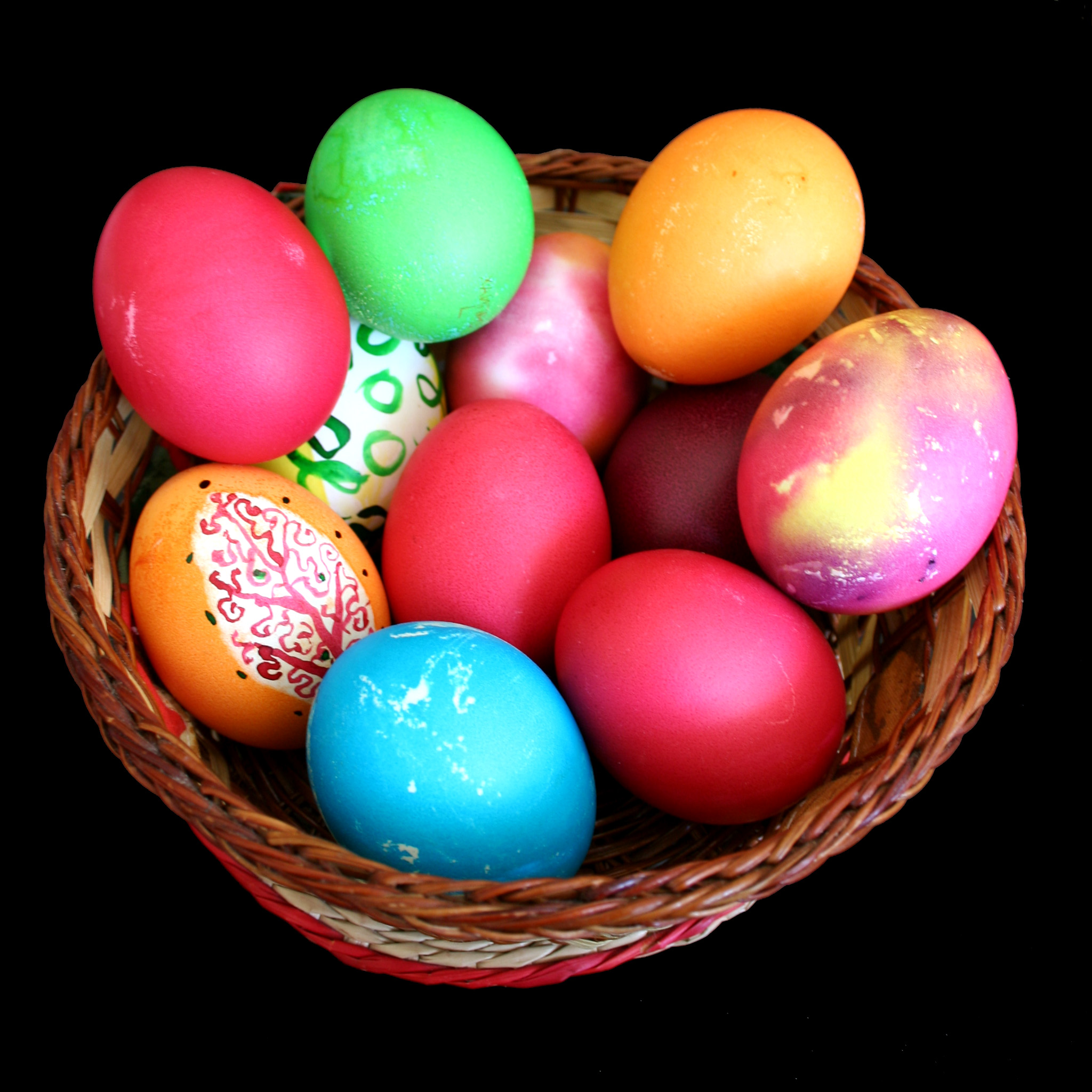
Decorated Easter eggs

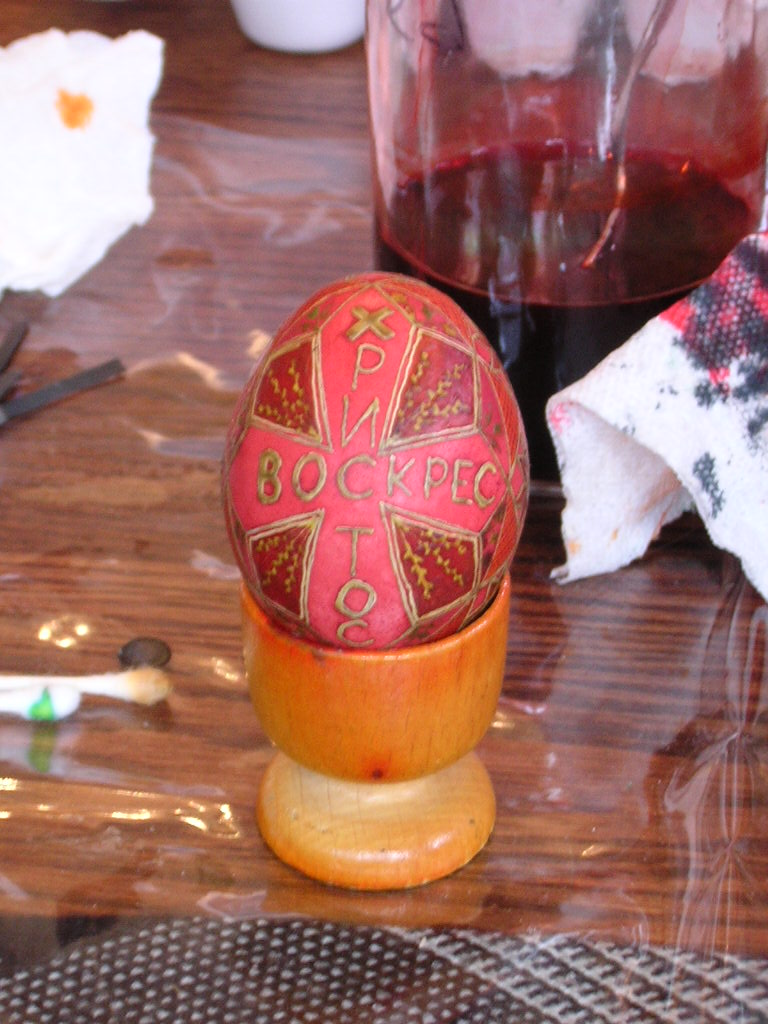
Easter egg of the Ukrainian variety with the Paschal greeting "Christ is Risen!"

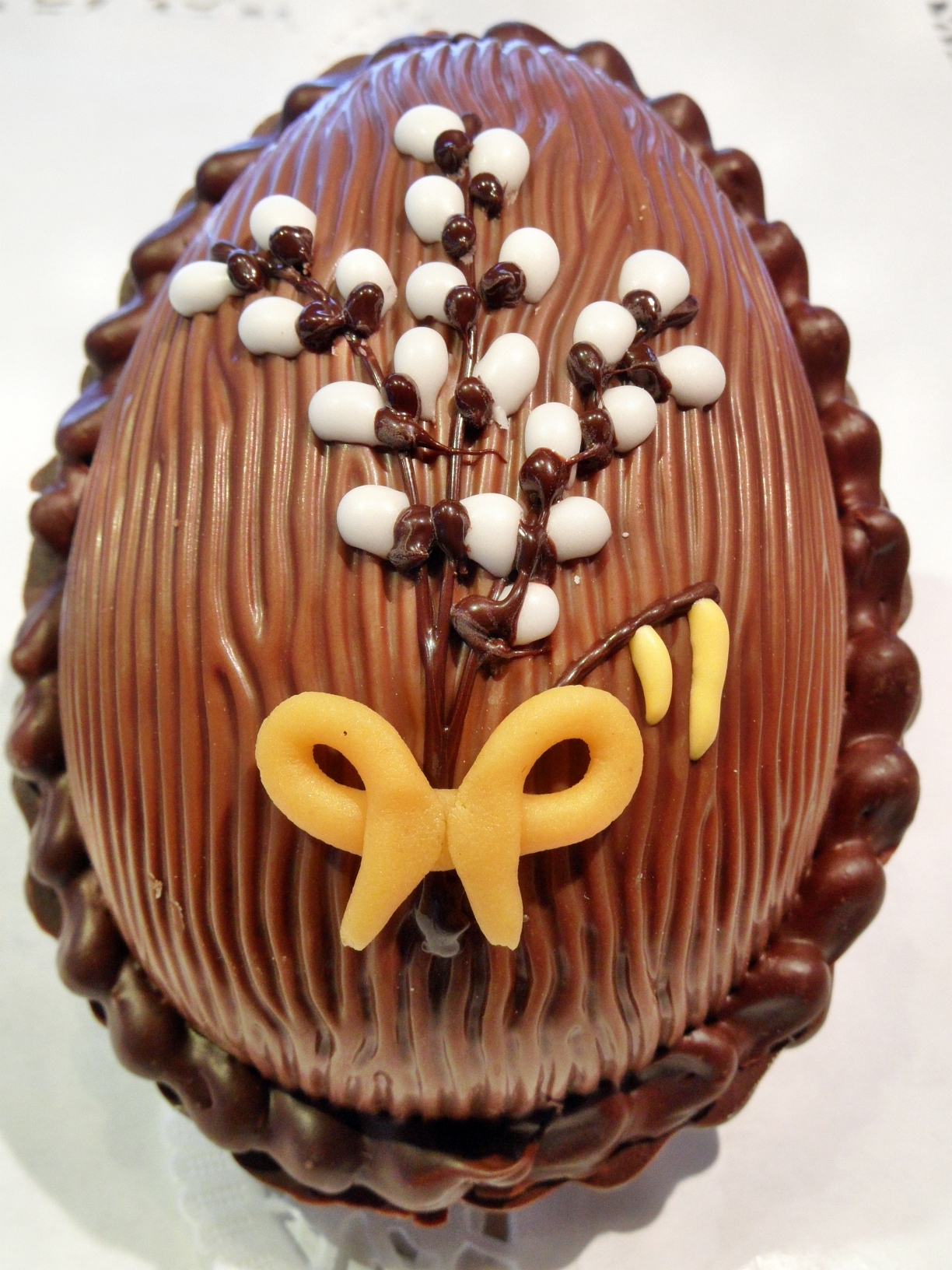
A chocolate Easter egg

Easter eggs, also called Paschal eggs, are eggs that are decorated for the Christian festival of Easter, which celebrates the resurrection of Jesus. As such, Easter eggs are commonly used during the season of Eastertide (Easter season). The oldest tradition, which continues to be used in Central and Eastern Europe, is to dye and paint chicken eggs.

Eggs are, in general, a traditional symbol of fertility and rebirth. In Christianity, for the celebration of Eastertide, Easter eggs symbolize the empty tomb of Jesus, from which Jesus was resurrected. The staining of Easter eggs with the colour red "in memory of the blood of Christ, shed as at that time of his crucifixion" was an ancient tradition.

This custom of the Easter egg, according to many sources, can be traced to early Christians of Mesopotamia, and from there it spread into Eastern Europe and Siberia through the Orthodox Churches, and later into Europe through the Catholic and Protestant Churches. Additionally, the widespread usage of Easter eggs, according to mediaevalist scholars, is due to the prohibition of eggs during Lent after which, on Easter, they are blessed for the occasion.

A modern custom in some places is to substitute chocolate eggs wrapped in coloured foil, hand-carved wooden eggs, or plastic eggs filled with confectionery such as chocolate.

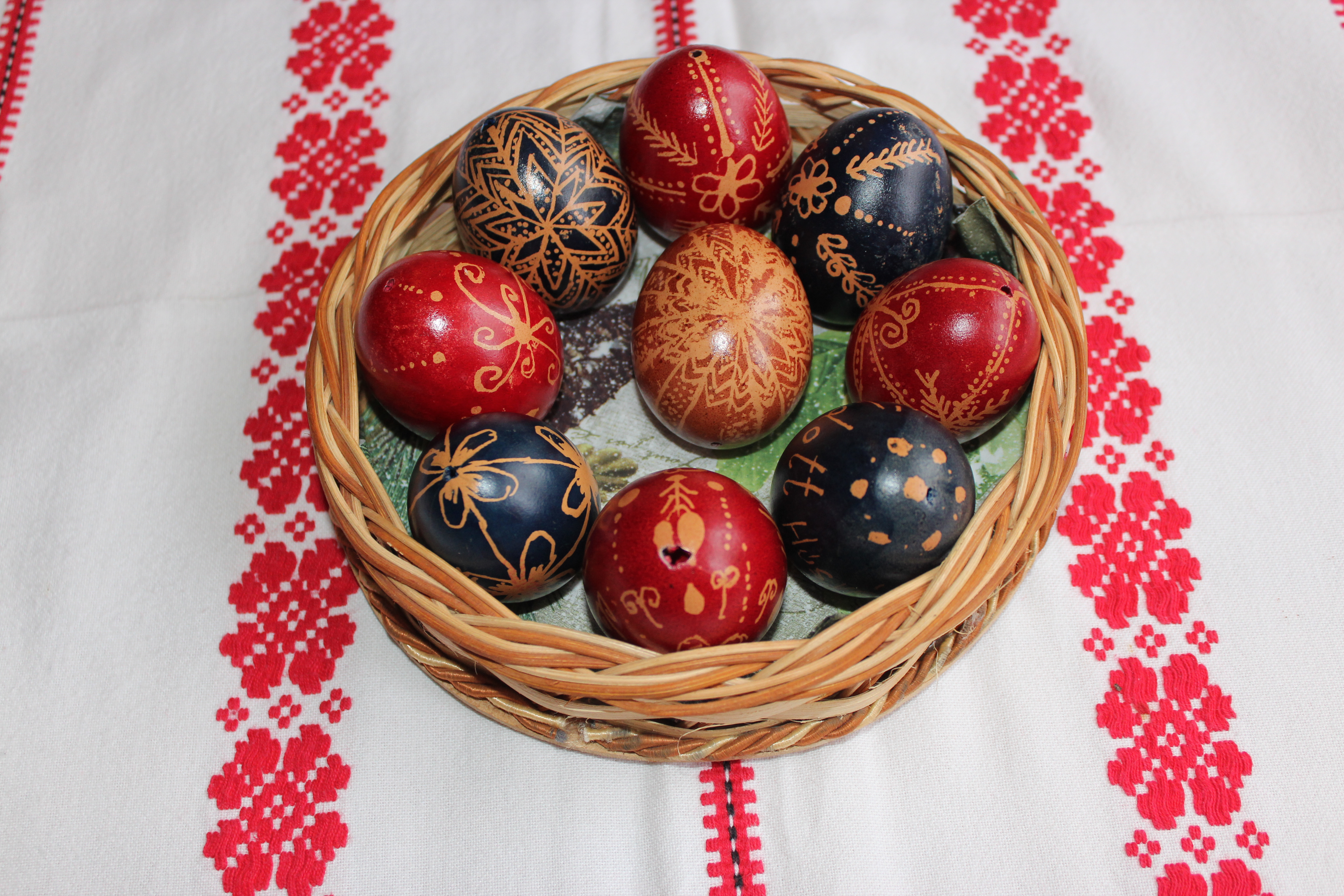
The Easter eggs of Hungary, called hímestojás are handmade and gifted during Locsolkodás typically as courting or to family. It is also used in ticselés which is traditional gambling for kids.

== History ==
The practice of decorating eggshells is quite ancient, with decorated, engraved ostrich eggs found in Africa which are 60,000 years old. In the pre-dynastic period of Egypt and the early cultures of Mesopotamia and Crete, eggs were associated with death and rebirth, as well as with kingship, with decorated ostrich eggs, and representations of ostrich eggs in gold and silver, were commonly placed in graves of the ancient Sumerians and Egyptians as early as 5,000 years ago. These cultural relationships may have influenced early Christian and Islamic cultures in those areas, as well as through mercantile, religious, and political links from those areas around the Mediterranean.

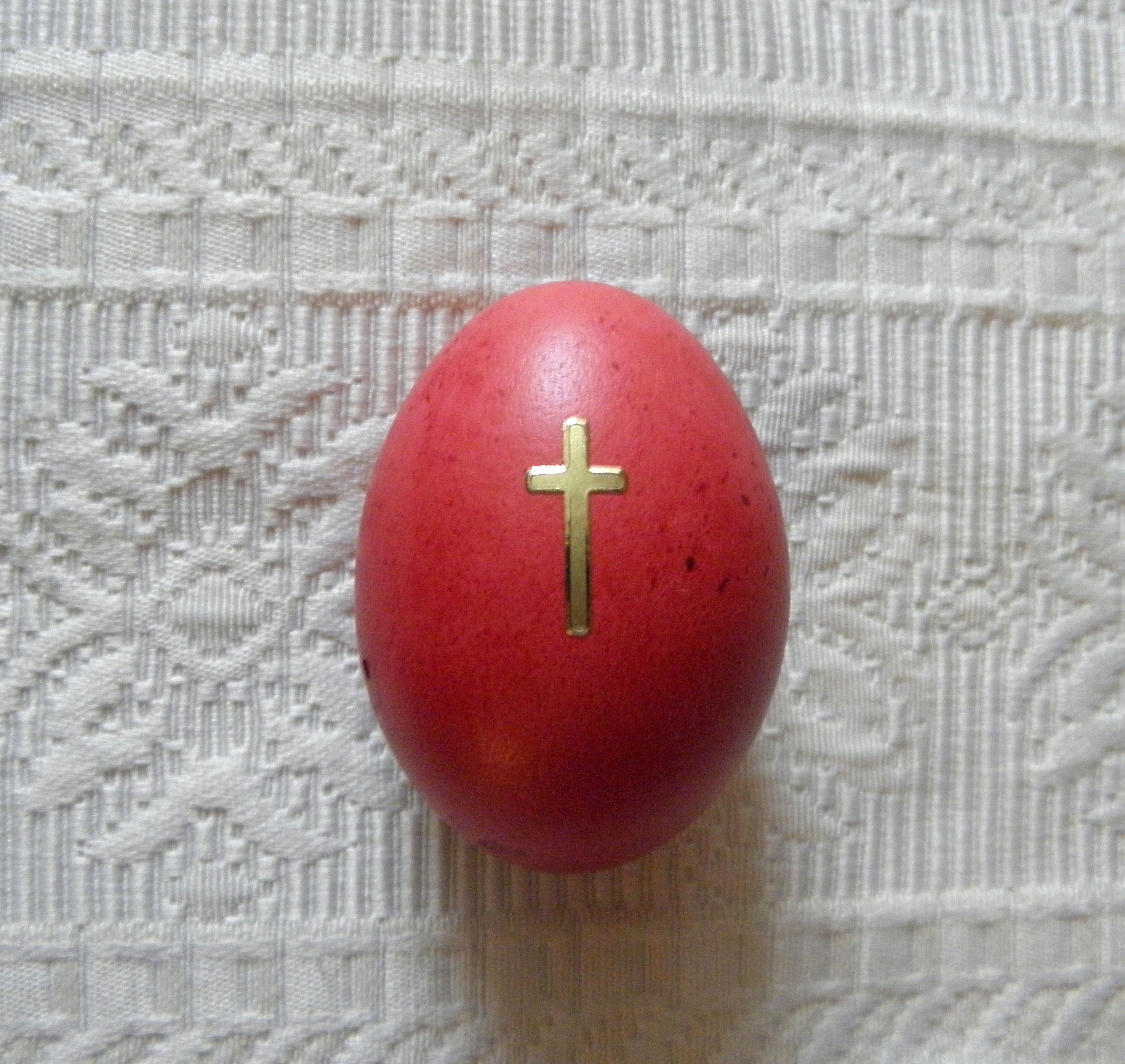
Red-coloured Easter egg with Christian cross, from the Saint Kosmas Aitolos Greek Orthodox Monastery

Eggs in Christianity carry a Trinitarian symbolism as shell, yolk, and albumen are three parts of one egg. According to many sources, the Christian custom of Easter eggs started among the early Christians of Mesopotamia, who stained them with red colouring "in memory of the blood of Christ, shed at His crucifixion". The Christian Church officially adopted the custom, regarding the eggs as a symbol of the resurrection of Jesus, with the Roman Ritual, the first edition of which was published in 1610 but which has texts of much older date, containing among the Easter Blessings of Food, one for eggs, along with those for lamb, bread, and new produce.

Lord, let the grace of your blessing + come upon these eggs, that they be healthful food for your faithful who eat them in thanksgiving for the resurrection of our Lord Jesus Christ, who lives and reigns with you forever and ever.

Sociology professor Kenneth Thompson discusses the spread of the Easter egg throughout Christendom, writing that "use of eggs at Easter seems to have come from Persia into the Greek Christian Churches of Mesopotamia, thence to Russia and Siberia through the medium of Orthodox Christianity. From the Greek Church the custom was adopted by either the Roman Catholics or the Protestants and then spread through Europe." Both Thompson, as well as British orientalist Thomas Hyde state that in addition to dyeing the eggs red, the early Christians of Mesopotamia also stained Easter eggs green and yellow.

Peter Gainsford maintains that the association between eggs and Easter most likely arose in western Europe during the Middle Ages as a result of the fact that Catholic Christians were prohibited from eating eggs during Lent, but were allowed to eat them when Easter arrived.

Influential 19th century folklorist and philologist Jacob Grimm speculates, in the second volume of his Deutsche Mythologie, that the folk custom of Easter eggs among the continental Germanic peoples may have stemmed from springtime festivities of a Germanic goddess known in Old English as Ēostre (namesake of modern English Easter) and possibly known in Old High German as *Ostara (and thus namesake of Modern German Ostern 'Easter'). However, despite Grimm's speculation, there is no evidence to connect eggs with a speculative deity named Ostara. The use of eggs as favors or treats at Easter originated when they were prohibited during Lent. A common practice in England in the medieval period was for children to go door-to-door begging for eggs on the Saturday before Lent began. People handed out eggs as special treats for children prior to their fast.

Although one of the Christian traditions are to use dyed or painted chicken eggs, a modern custom is to substitute chocolate eggs, or plastic eggs filled with candy such as jelly beans; as many people give up sweets as their Lenten sacrifice, individuals enjoy them at Easter after having abstained from them during the preceding forty days of Lent. These eggs can be hidden for children to find on Easter morning, which is said to be left by the Easter Bunny. They may also be put in a basket filled with real or artificial straw to resemble a bird's nest.

While the practice of giving away easter eggs is, to this day, popular, it was briefly banned in 1916s Hungary in the Easter Egg Act, due to the scarcity caused by the ongoing war, and the ban was only lifted when the war ended. The contemporary news reports emphasised however, that the locsolás was still legal to practice.

== Traditions and customs ==
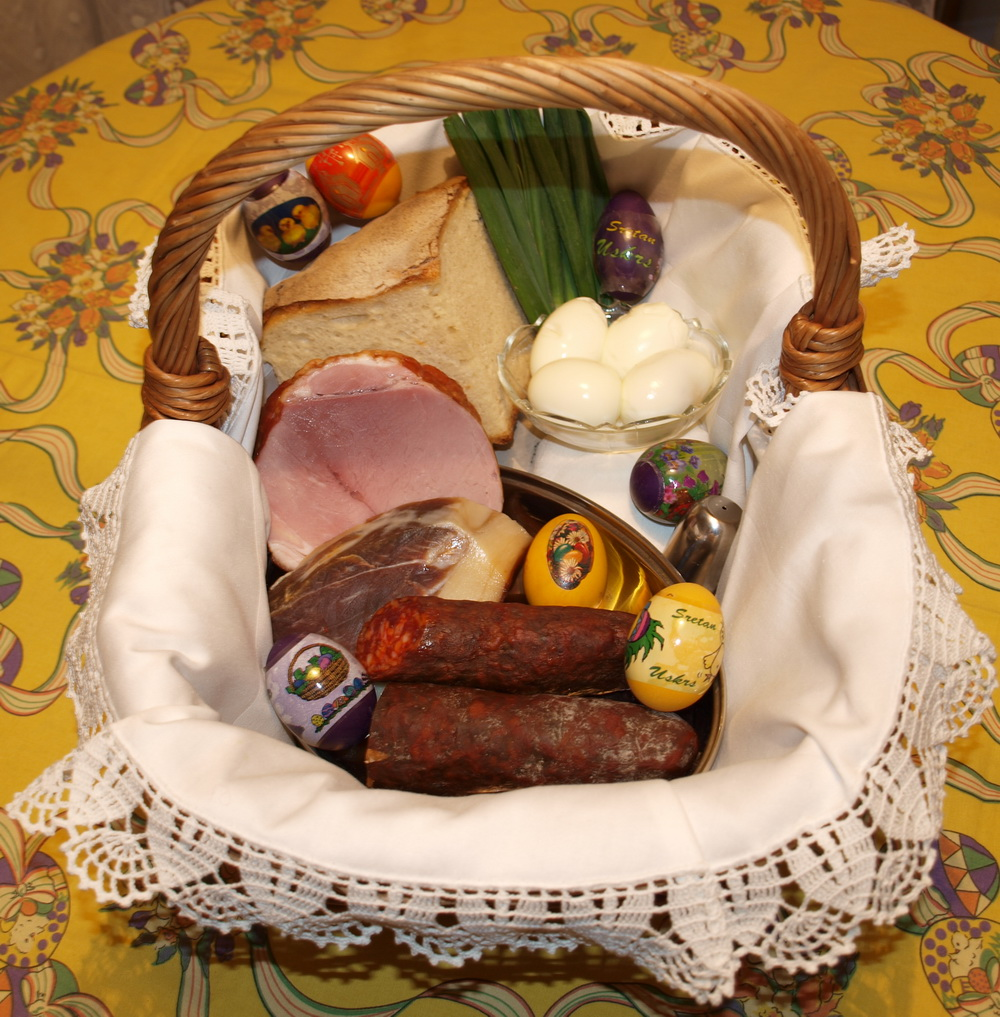
Croatian Easter basket

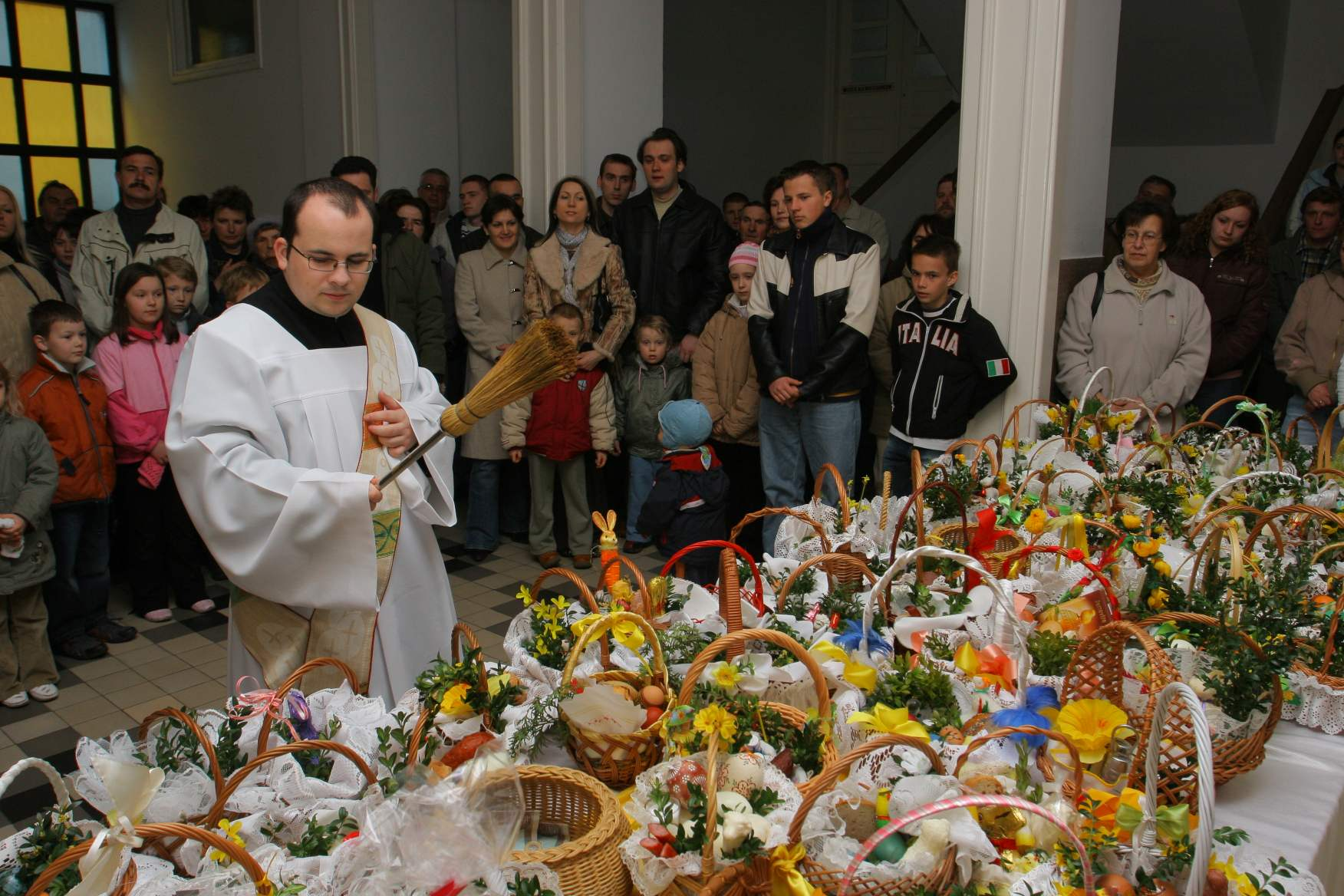
Blessing of Easter foods in Poland

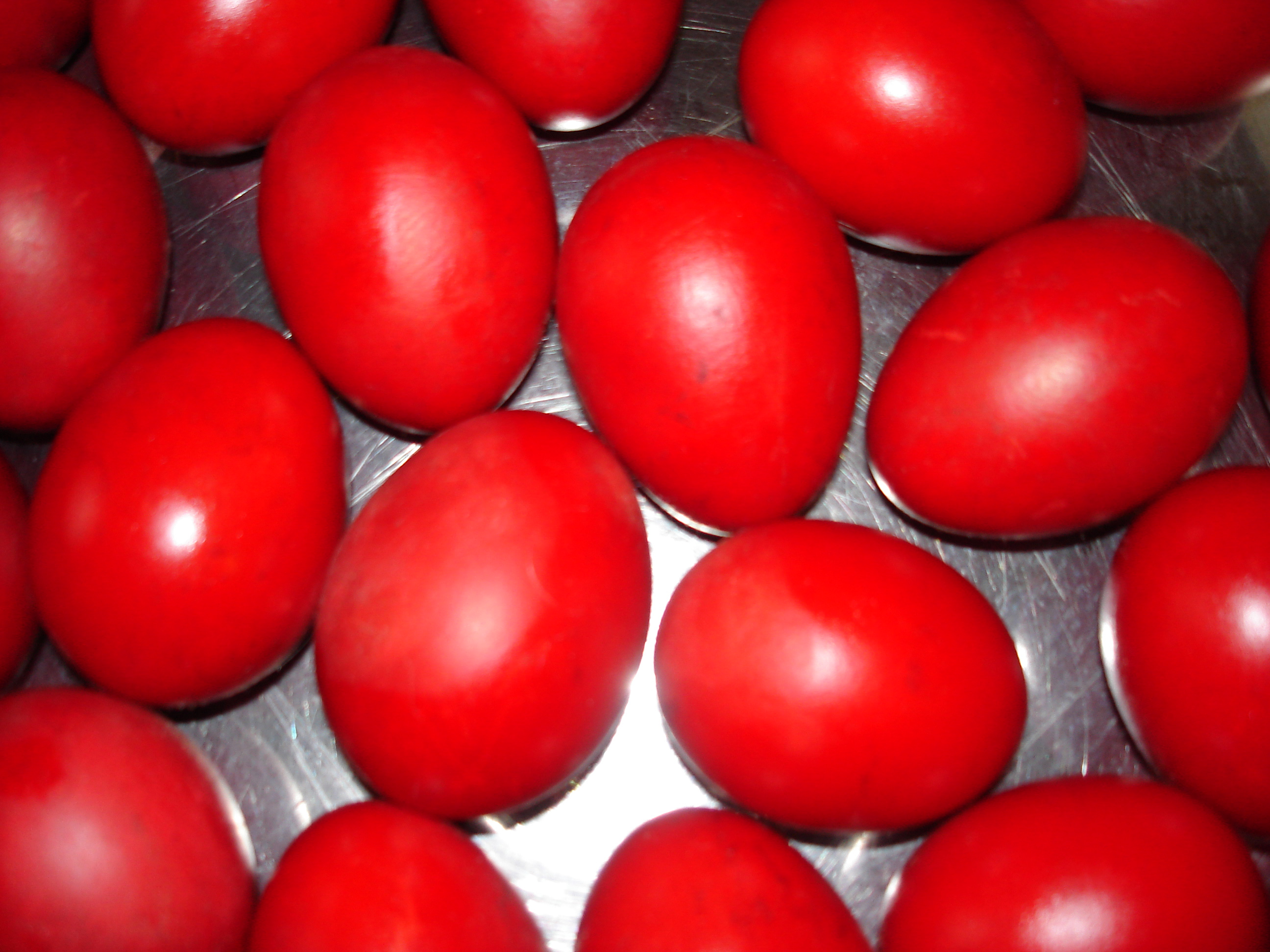
Red coloured Easter eggs

=== Lenten tradition ===
The Easter egg tradition may also have merged into the celebration of the end of the privations of Lent. Traditionally, eggs are among the foods forbidden on fast days, including all of Lent, an observance which continues among the Eastern Christian Churches but has fallen into disuse in Western Christianity.

Historically, it has been traditional to use up all of the household's eggs before Lent began.

This established the tradition of Pancake Day being celebrated on Shrove Tuesday. This day, the Tuesday before Ash Wednesday when Lent begins, is also known as Mardi Gras, a French phrase which translates as "Fat Tuesday" to mark the last consumption of eggs and dairy before Lent begins.

In the Orthodox Church, Great Lent begins on Clean Monday, rather than Wednesday, so the household's dairy products would be used up in the preceding week, called Cheesefare Week.

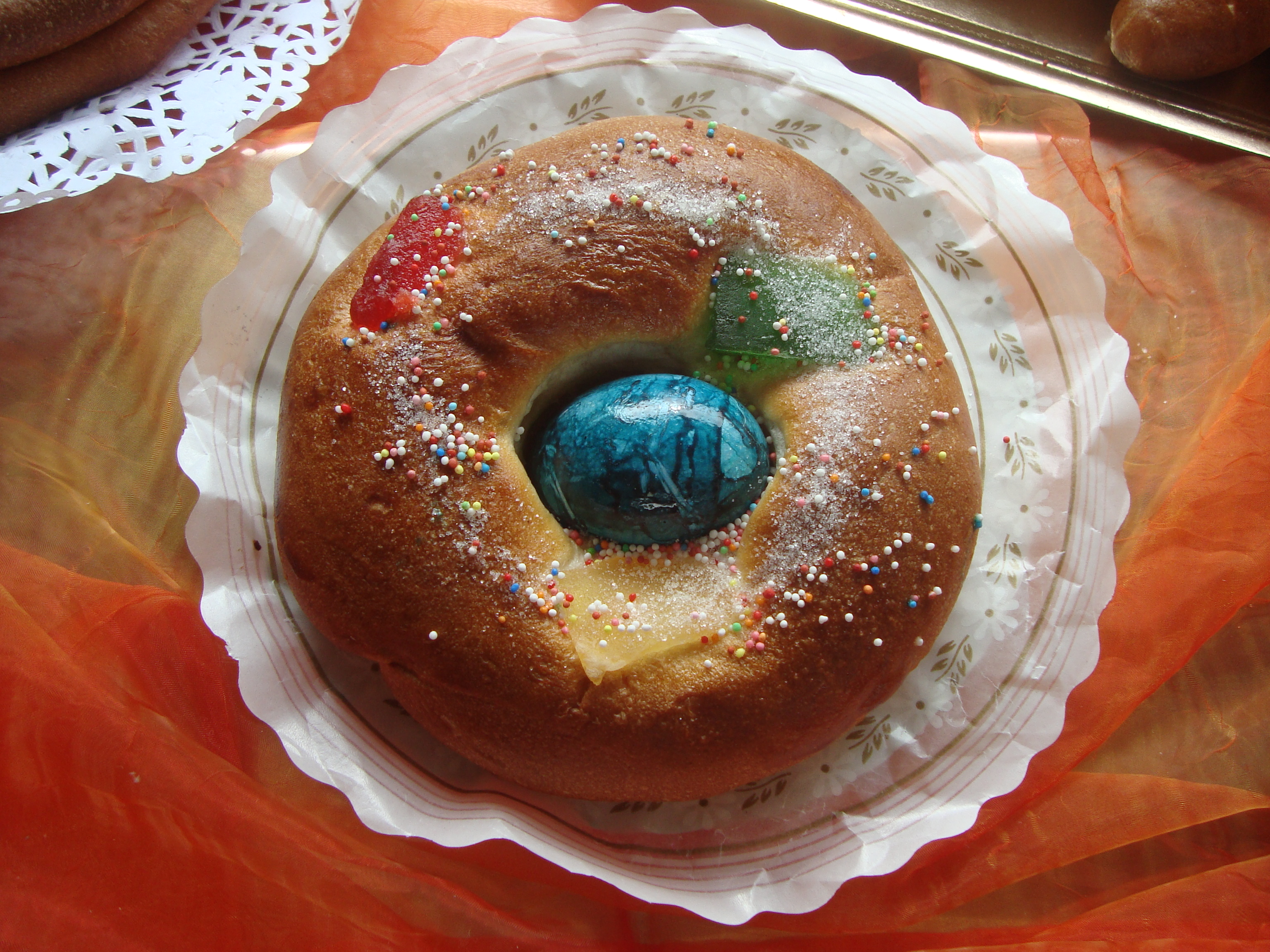
Easter mona with chocolate or natural boiled eggs

During Lent, since chickens would not stop producing eggs during this time, a larger than usual store might be available at the end of the fast. This surplus, if any, had to be eaten quickly to prevent spoiling. Then, with the coming of Easter, the eating of eggs resumes. Some families cook a special meatloaf with eggs in it to be eaten with the Easter dinner.

To avoid waste, it was common for families to hard boil or pickle eggs that their chickens produced during lent, and for this reason the Spanish dish hornazo (traditionally eaten on and around Easter) contains hard-boiled eggs as a primary ingredient. In Spain it is common for godparents to give an Easter mona to their godchildren during Easter period. In Hungary, eggs are used sliced in potato casseroles around the Easter period.

=== Symbolism and related customs ===
Some Christians symbolically link the cracking open of Easter eggs with the empty tomb of Jesus.

In the Orthodox churches, Easter eggs are blessed by the priest at the end of the Paschal Vigil (which is equivalent to Holy Saturday), and distributed to the faithful. The egg is seen by followers of Christianity as a symbol of resurrection: while being dormant it contains a new life sealed within it.

Similarly, in the Roman Catholic Church in Poland, the so-called święconka, i.e. blessing of decorative baskets with a sampling of Easter eggs and other symbolic foods, is one of the Polish traditions on Holy Saturday.

During Paschaltide, in some traditions the Pascal greeting with the Easter egg is even extended to the deceased. On either the second Monday or Tuesday of Pascha, after a memorial service people bring blessed eggs to the cemetery and bring the joyous paschal greeting, "Christ has risen", to their beloved departed (see Radonitza).

In Greece, women traditionally dye the eggs with onion skins and vinegar on Thursday (also the day of Communion). These ceremonial eggs are known as kokkina avga. They also bake tsoureki for the Easter Sunday feast. Red Easter eggs are sometimes served along the centerline of tsoureki (braided loaf of bread).

In Egypt, it is a tradition to decorate boiled eggs during Sham el-Nessim holiday, which falls every year after the Eastern Christian Easter.

In Palestine, in many Palestinian Christian communities, red-dyed eggs are prepared and shared after the Paschal service as a symbol of the resurrection of Jesus Christ. The eggs are often exchanged among family members and friends following the Easter liturgy. In some households and parish settings, they are also used in egg-tapping games, where participants strike eggs against each other as part of Easter celebrations.

On Passover, Jews place a hard-boiled egg on the Passover seder plate and in some communities hard-boiled eggs are eaten at the seder along with karpas, dipped in salt water.

=== Colouring ===
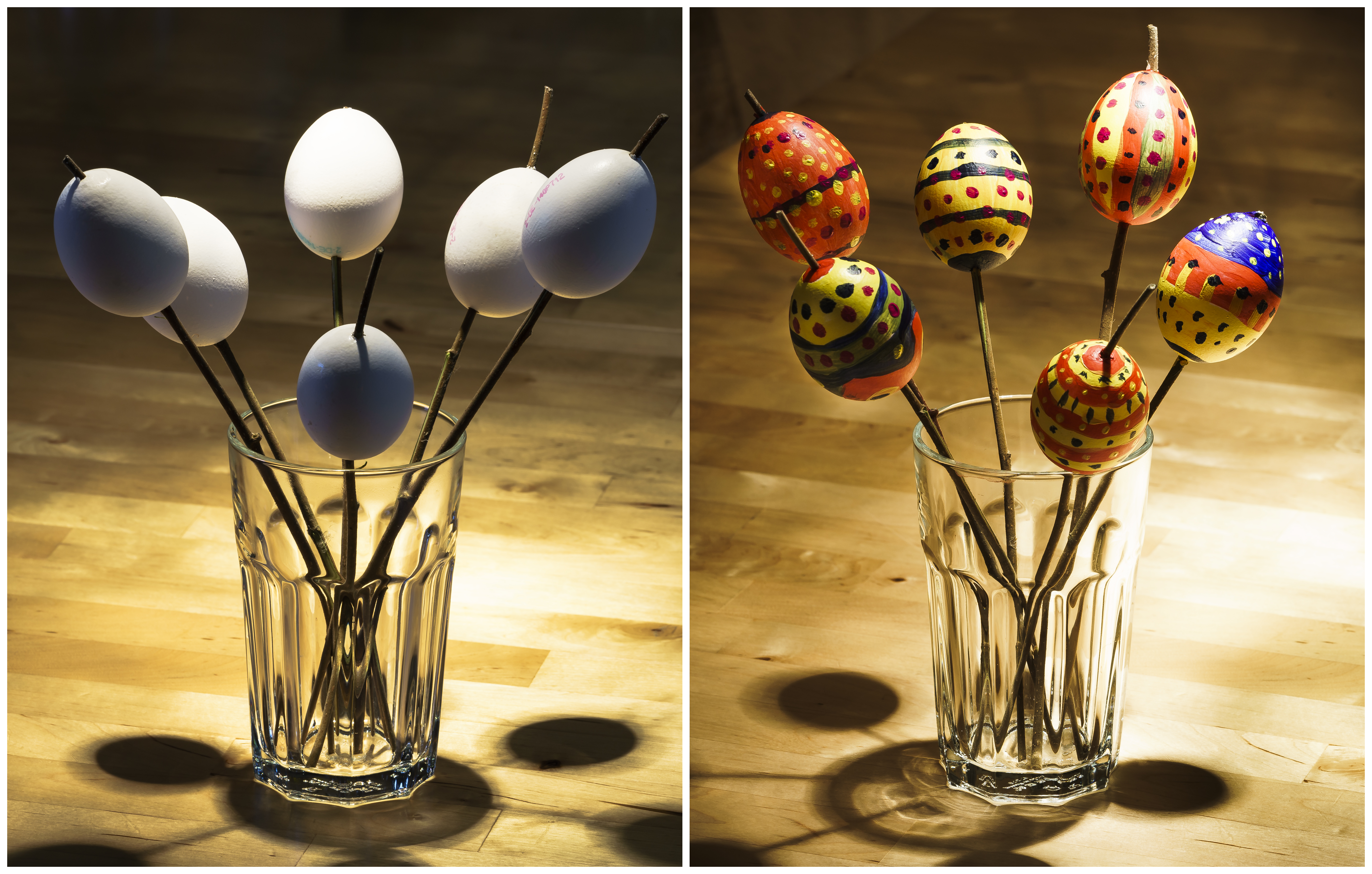
Easter eggs before and after colouring

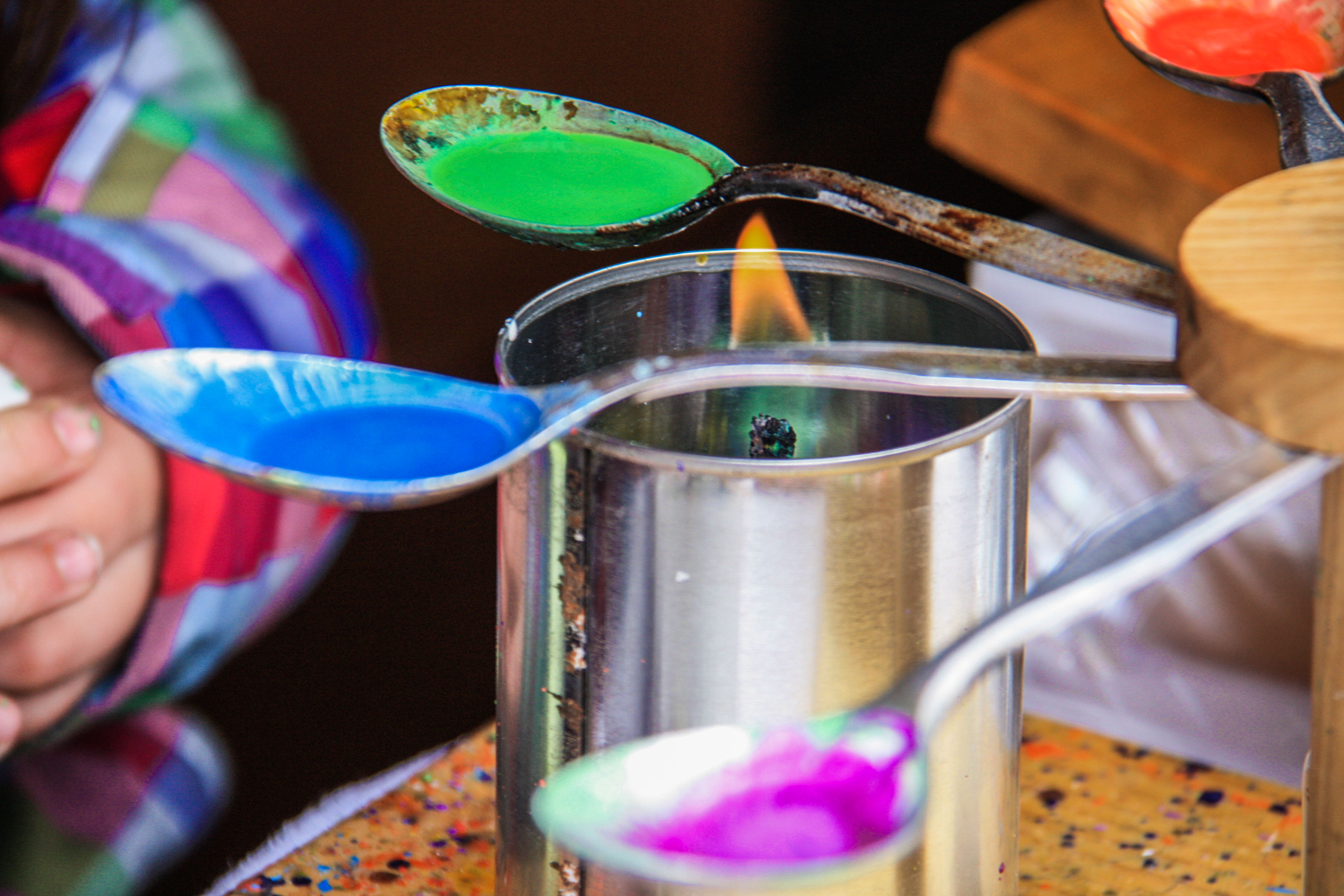
Heated wax paint used to decorate traditional Easter Eggs in the Czech Republic and Slovakia

The dyeing of Easter eggs in different colours is commonplace, with colour being achieved through boiling the egg in natural substances (such as, onion peel (brown colour), oak or alder bark or walnut nutshell (black), beet juice (pink) etc.), or using artificial colourings.

A greater variety of colour was often provided by tying on the onion skin with different coloured woollen yarn. In the North of England these are called pace-eggs or paste-eggs, from a dialectal form of Middle English pasche. King Edward I's household accounts in 1290 list an item of 'one shilling and sixpence for the decoration and distribution of 450 Pace-eggs!', which were to be coloured or gilded and given to members of the royal household. Traditionally in England, eggs were wrapped in onion skins and boiled to make their shells look like mottled gold, or wrapped in flowers and leaves first in order to leave a pattern, which parallels a custom practised in traditional Scandinavian culture. Eggs could also be drawn on with a wax candle before staining, often with a person's name and date on the egg. Pace Eggs were generally eaten for breakfast on Easter Sunday breakfast. Alternatively, they could be kept as decorations, used in egg-jarping (egg tapping) games, or given to Pace Eggers. In more recent centuries in England, eggs have been stained with coffee grains or simply boiled and painted in their shells.

In the Orthodox and Eastern Catholic Churches, Easter eggs are dyed red to represent the blood of Christ, with further symbolism being found in the hard shell of the egg symbolizing the sealed Tomb of Christ—the cracking of which symbolized his resurrection from the dead. The tradition of red Easter eggs was used by the Russian Orthodox Church. The tradition to dyeing the easter eggs in an Onion tone exists in the cultures of Albania, Armenia, Bulgaria, Georgia, Lithuania, Ukraine, Belarus, Russia, Czechia, Romania, Serbia, Slovakia, Slovenia, and Israel. The colour is made by boiling onion peel in water.

=== Patterning ===
When boiling them with onion skins, leaves can be attached prior to dyeing to create leaf patterns. The leaves are attached to the eggs before they are dyed with a transparent cloth to wrap the eggs with like inexpensive muslin or nylon stockings, leaving patterns once the leaves are removed after the dyeing process. These eggs are part of Easter custom in many areas and often accompany other traditional Easter foods. Passover haminados are prepared with similar methods.

Pysanky are Ukrainian Easter eggs, decorated using a wax-resist (batik) method. The word comes from the verb pysaty, "to write", as the designs are not painted on, but written with beeswax. Lithuanians create intricately detailed margučiai using a hot wax application and dipping method, and also by dipping the eggs first and then etching designs into the shells.

Decorating eggs for Easter using wax resistant batik is a popular method in some other eastern European countries.

=== Use of Easter eggs in decorations ===
In some Mediterranean countries, especially in Lebanon, chicken eggs are boiled and decorated by dye and/or painting and used as decoration around the house. Then, on Easter Day, young kids would duel with them saying "Christ is resurrected, Indeed, He is", breaking and eating them. This also happens in Georgia, Bulgaria, Cyprus, Greece, North Macedonia, Romania, Russia, Serbia and Ukraine. In Easter Sunday friends and family hit each other's egg with their own. The one whose egg does not break is believed to be in for good luck in the future.

In Germany, eggs decorate trees and bushes as Easter egg trees, and in several areas public wells as Osterbrunnen.

There used to be a custom in Ukraine, during Easter celebrations to have krashanky on a table in a bowl with wheatgrass. The number of the krashanky equalled the number of departed family members.

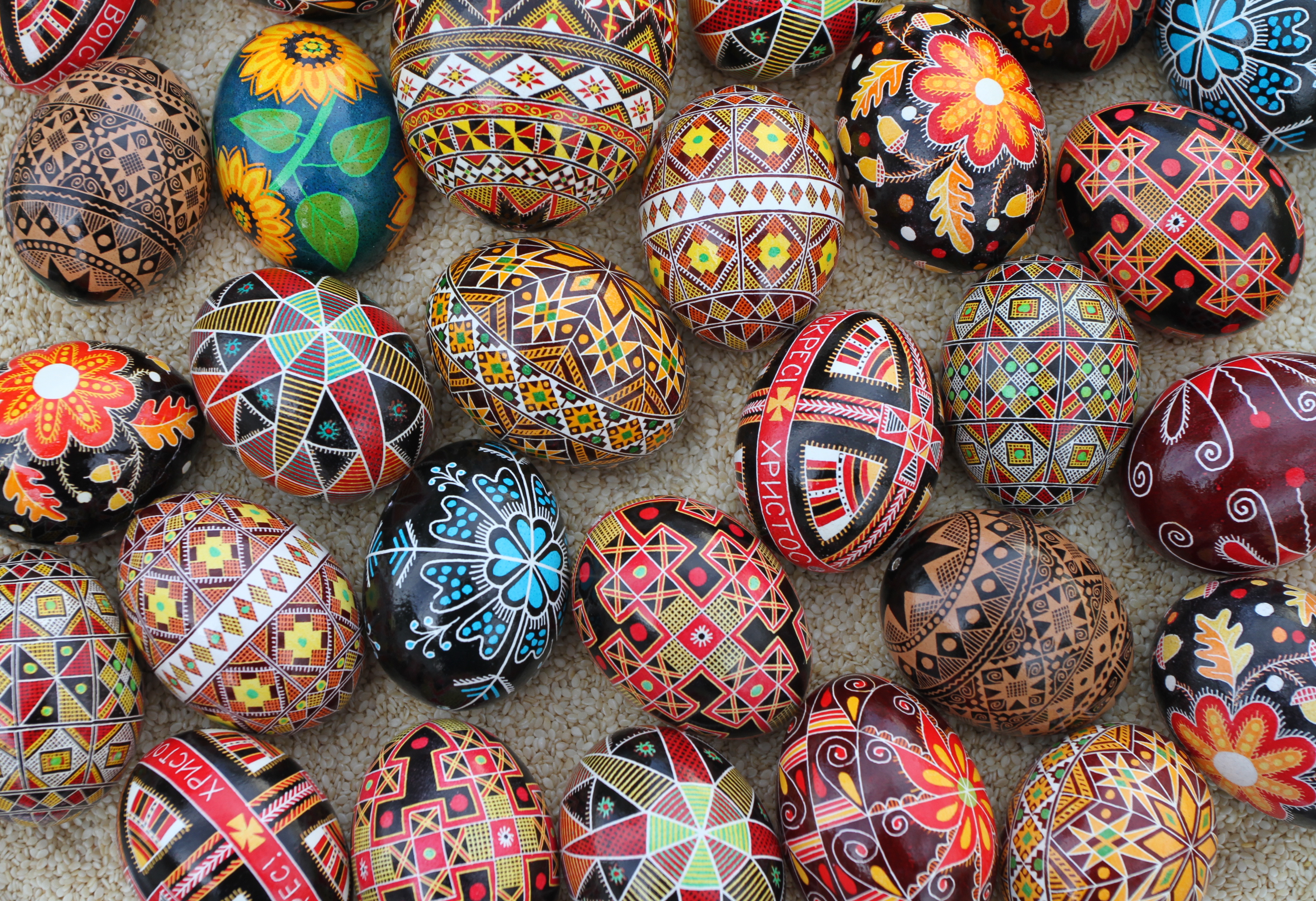
Ukrainian Easter eggs

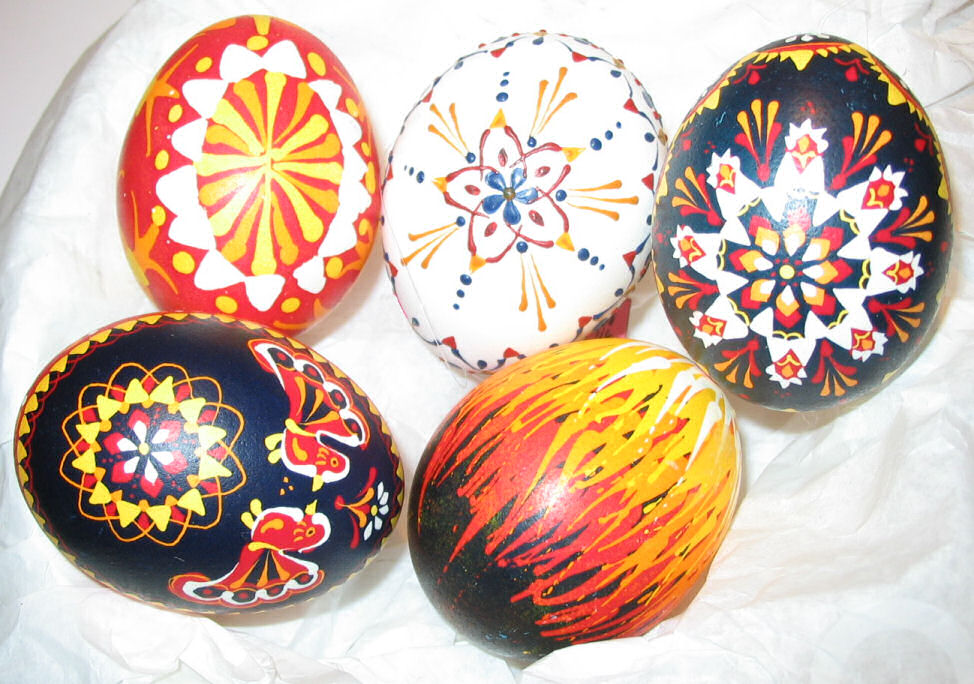
Easter eggs from Sorbs

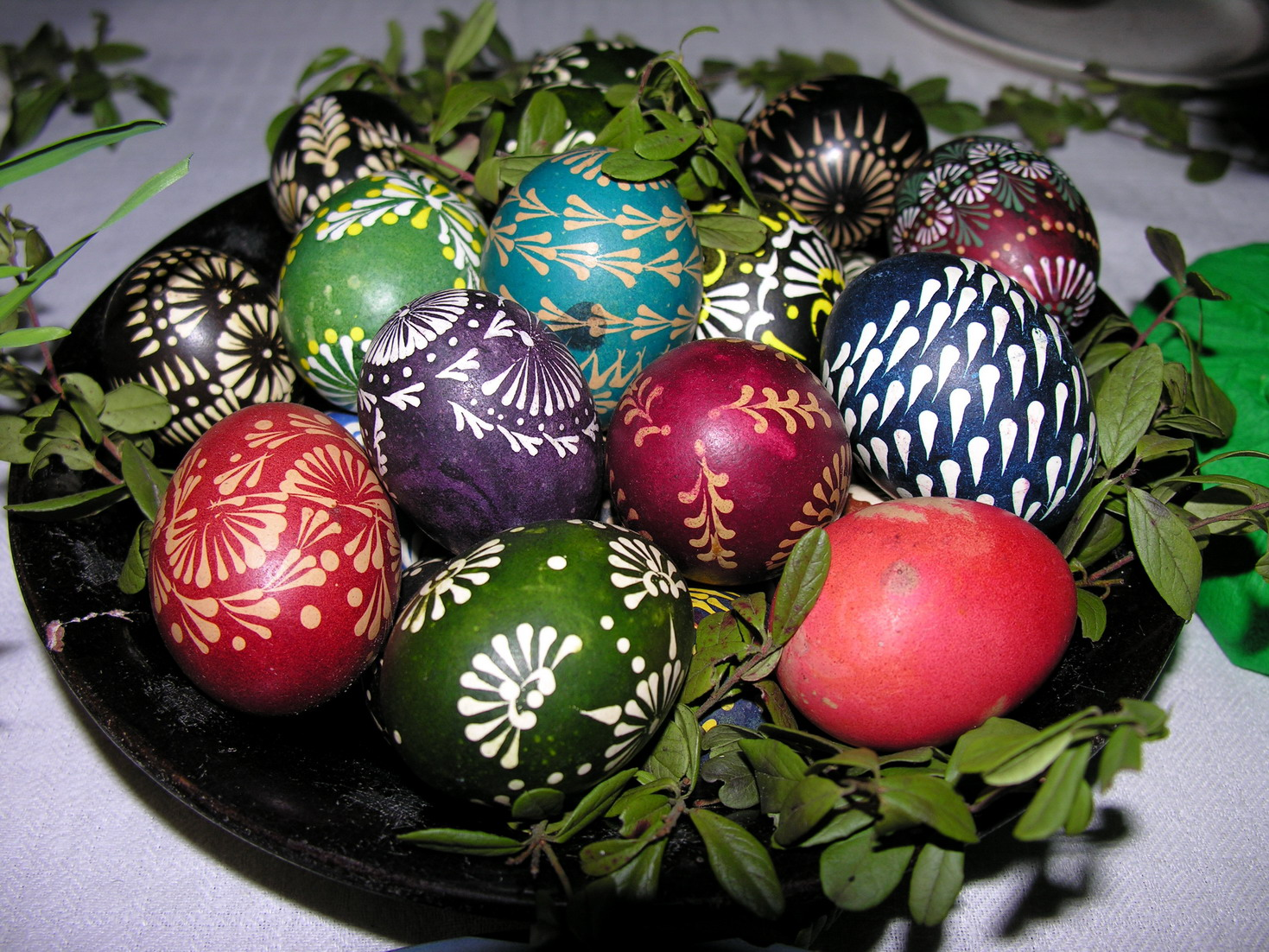
Easter eggs from Lithuania

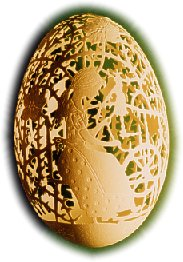
Perforated egg from Germany, Sleeping Beauty

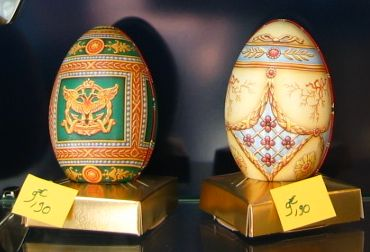
Norwegian Easter eggs

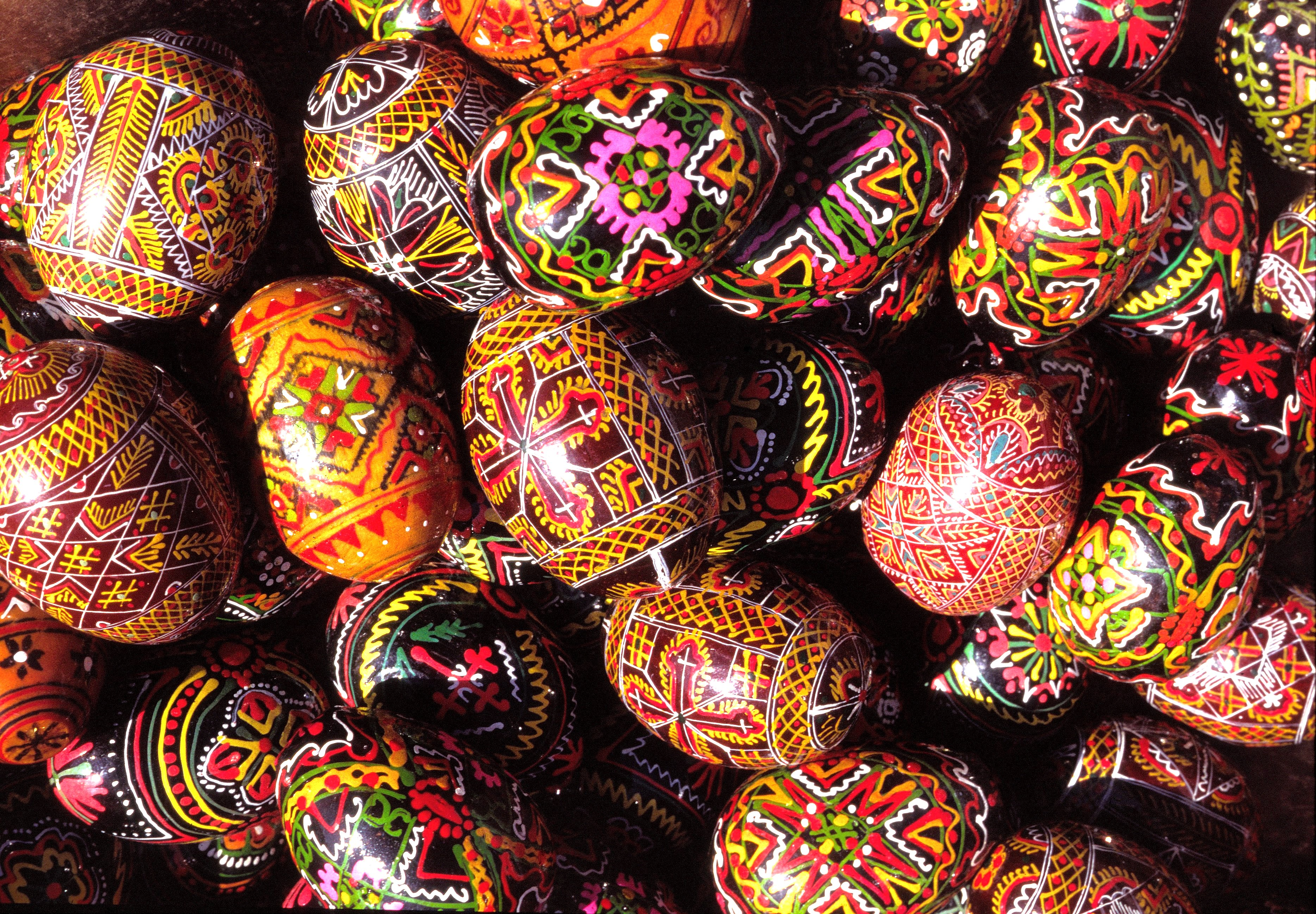
Easter eggs from Greece

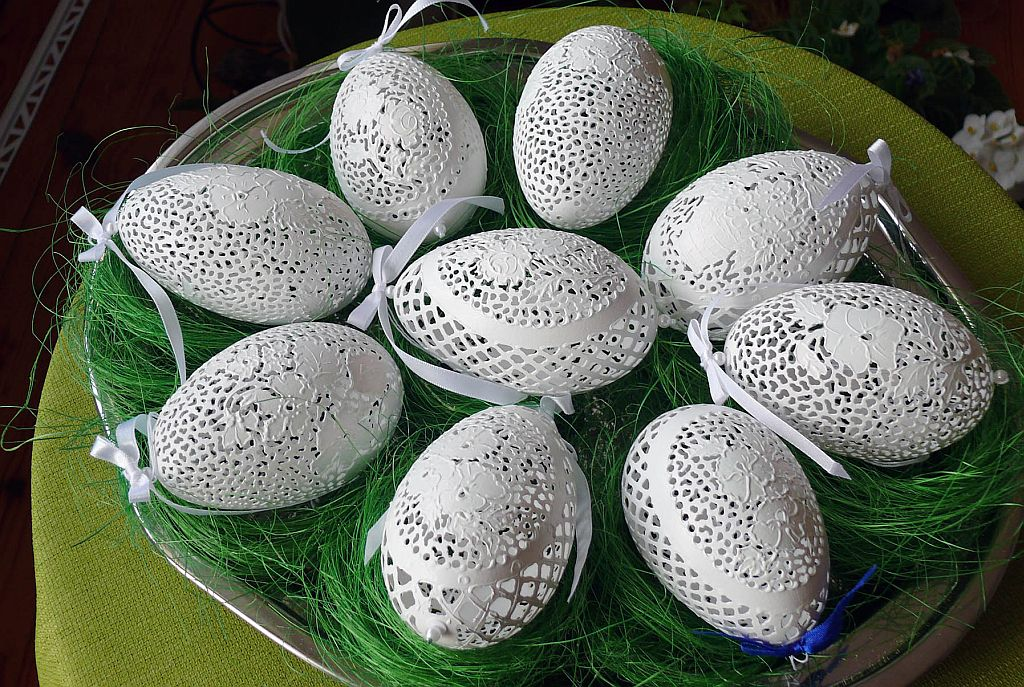
Perforated eggs

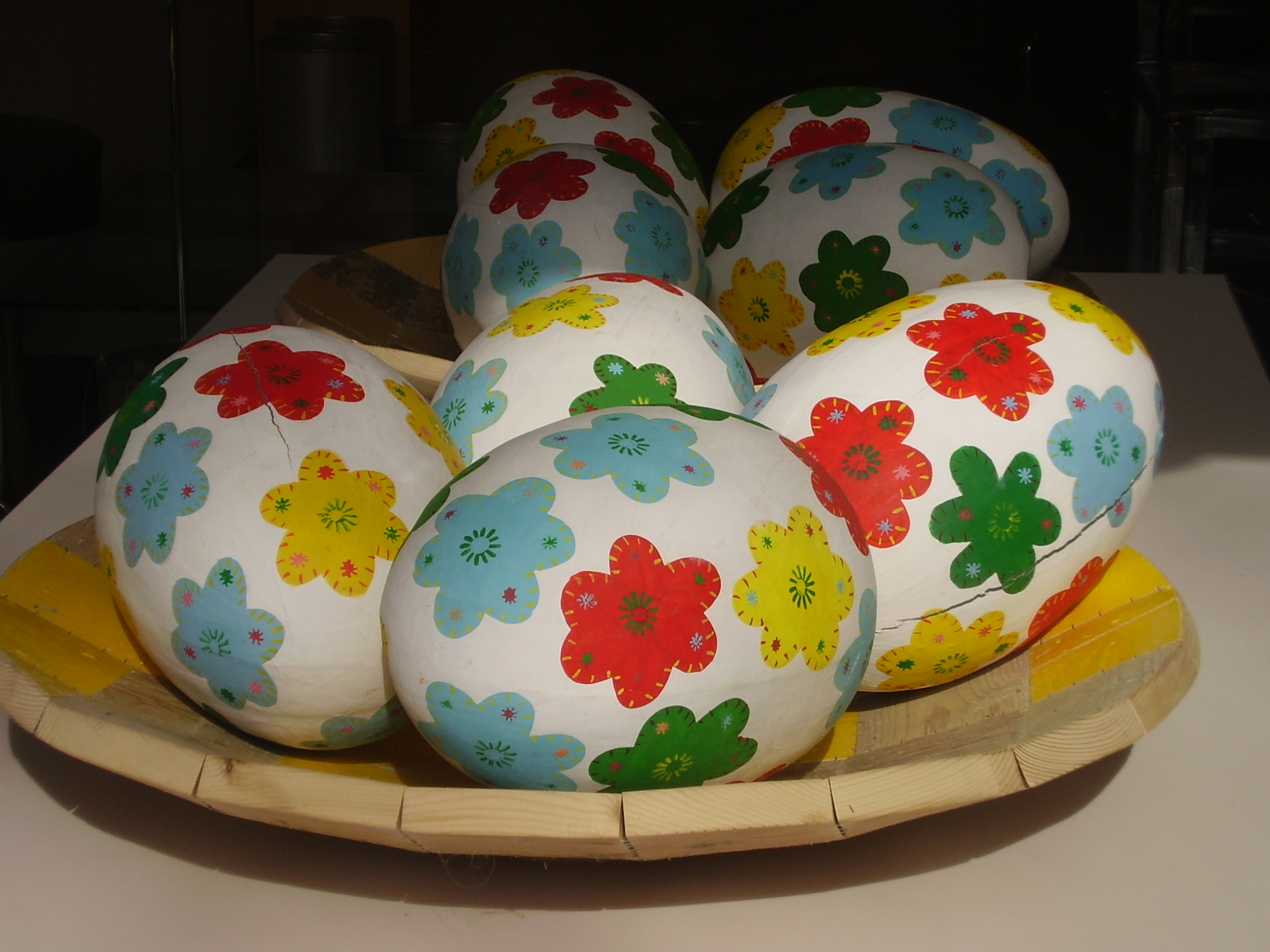
Easter eggs from France

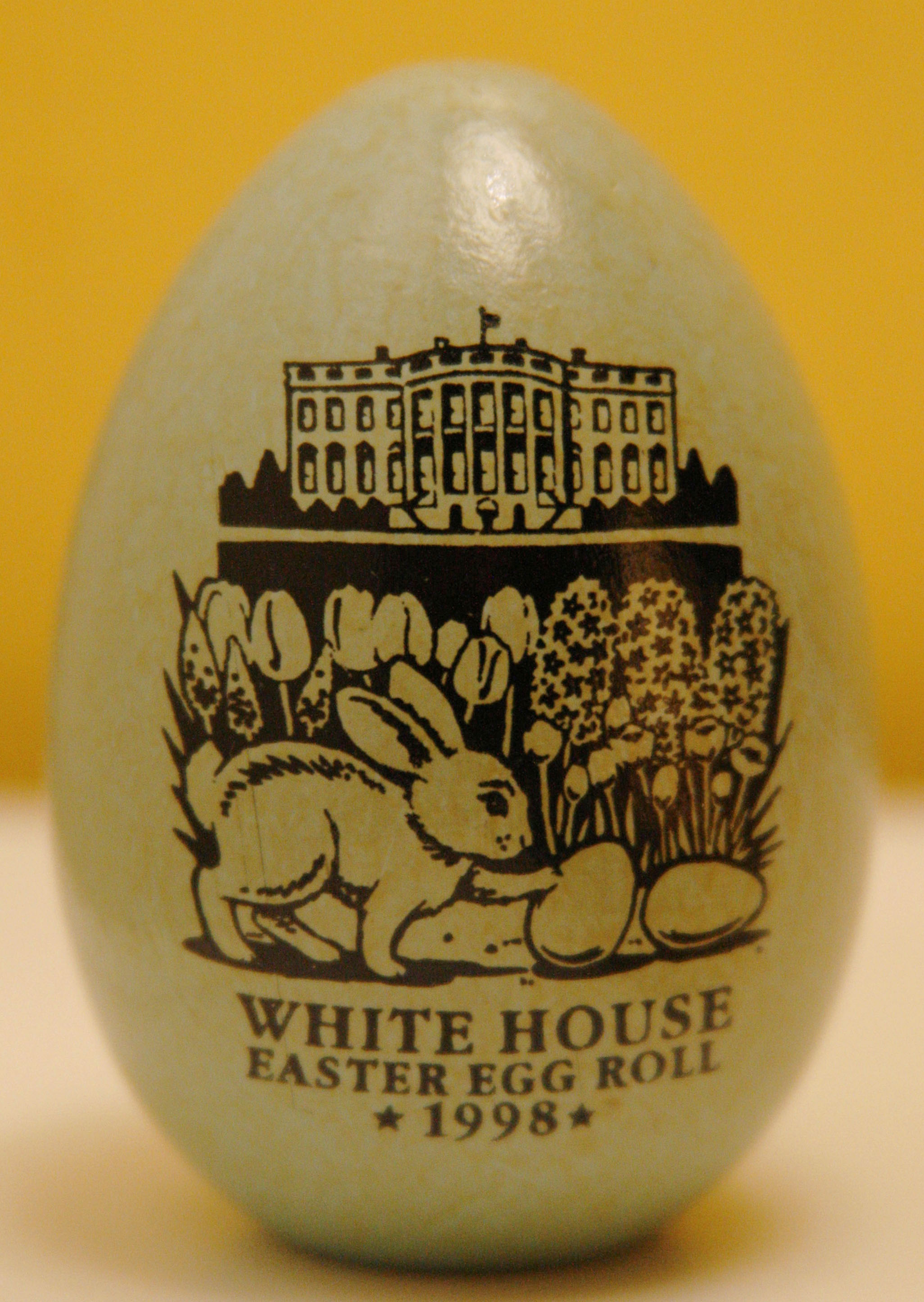
American Easter egg from the White House Washington, D.C.

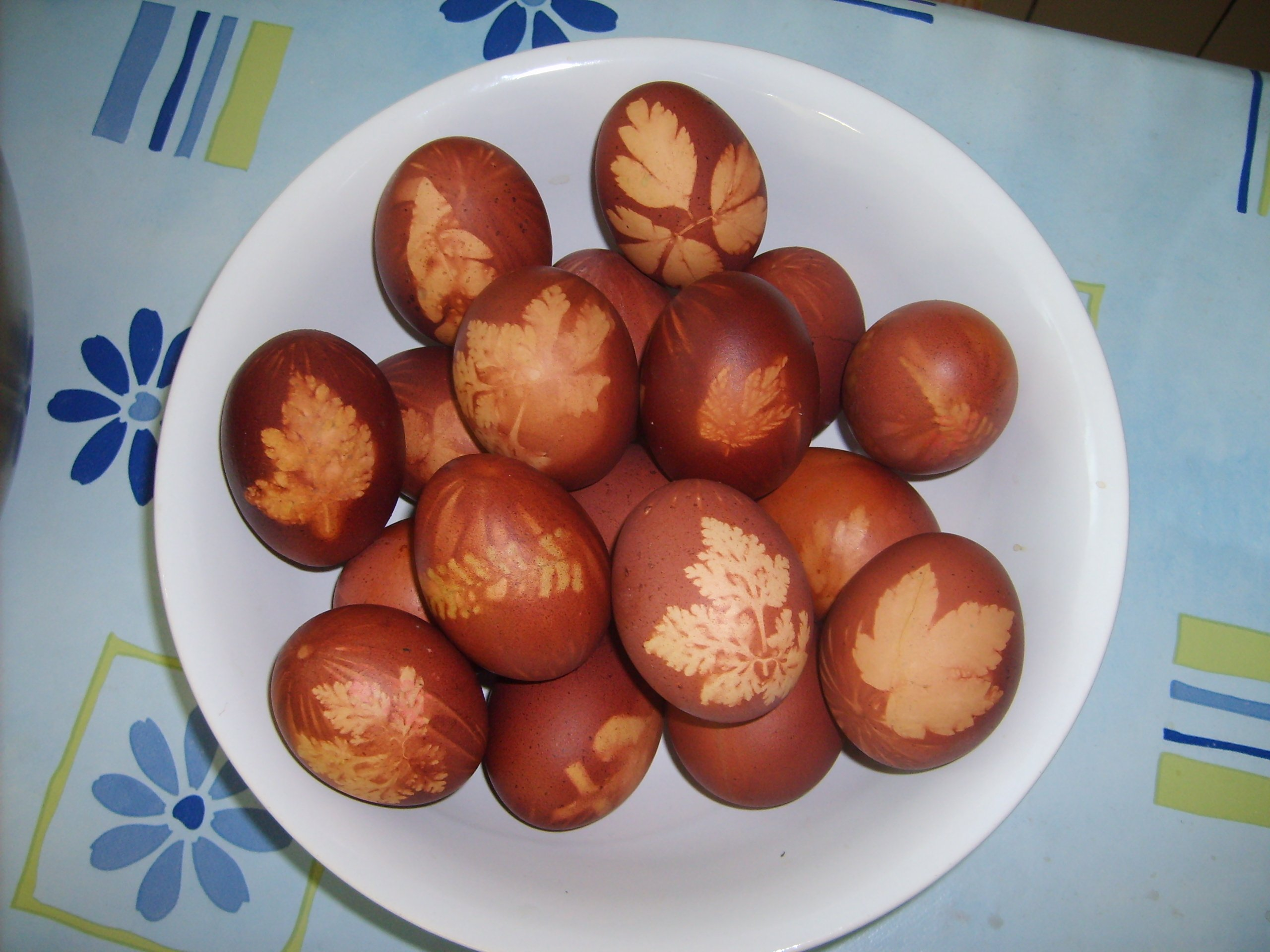
Pace eggs boiled with onion skins and leaf patterns.

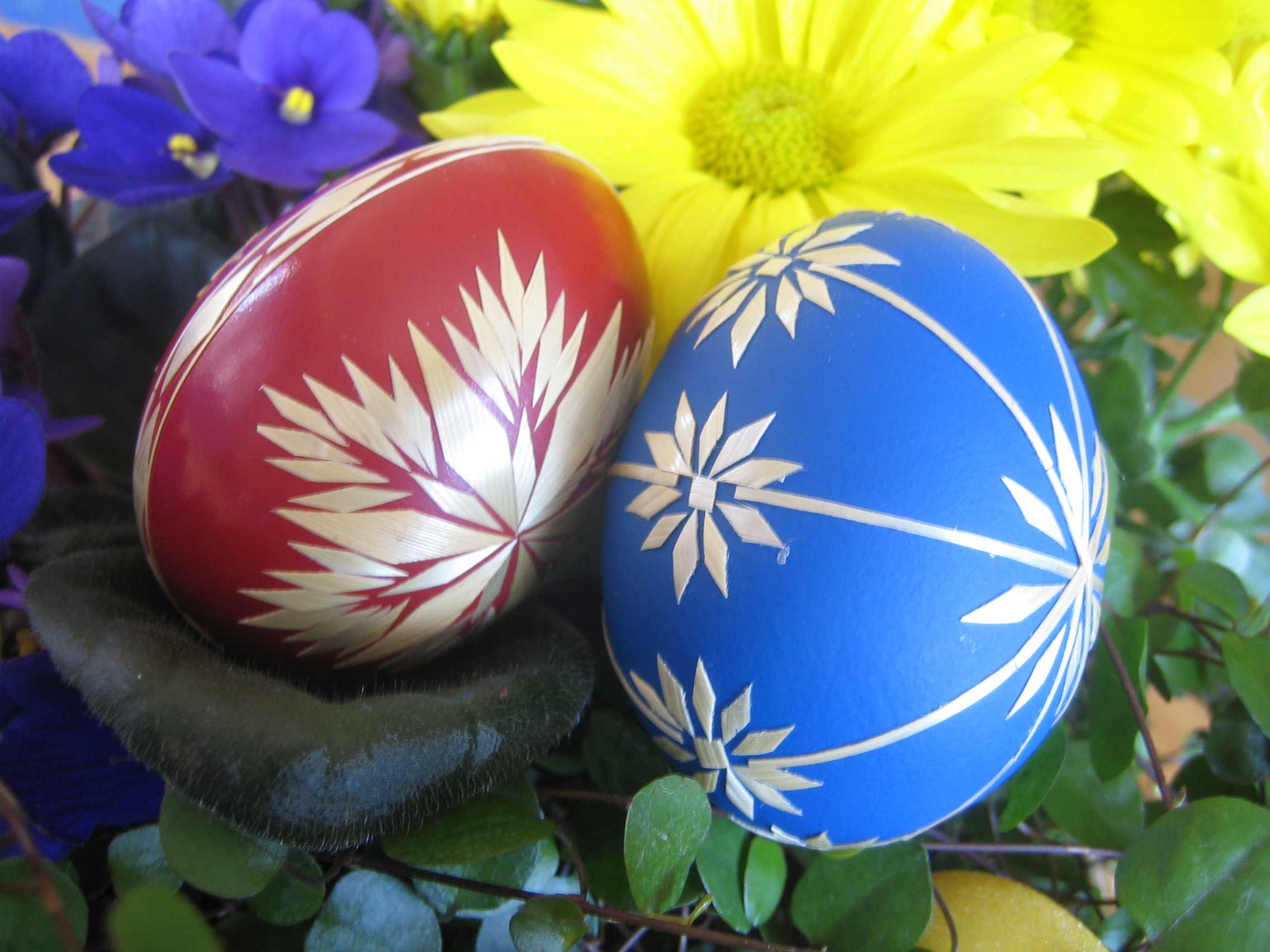
Easter eggs decorated with straw

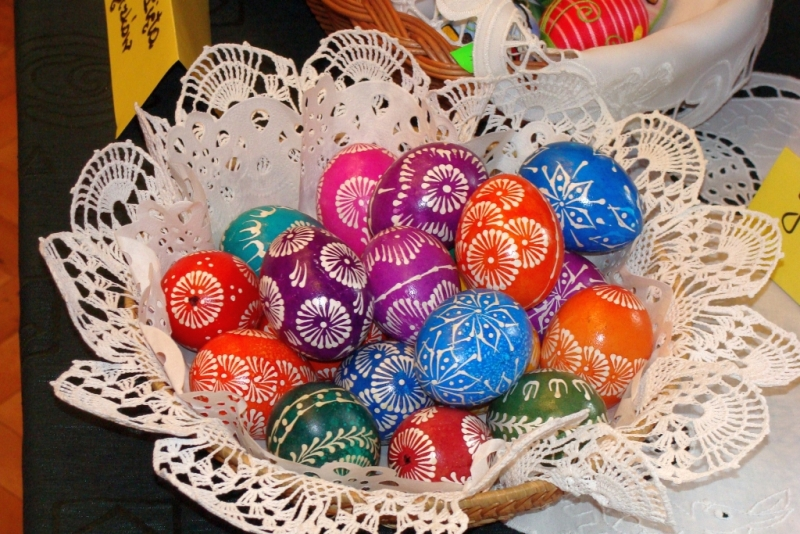
Easter egg from Poland

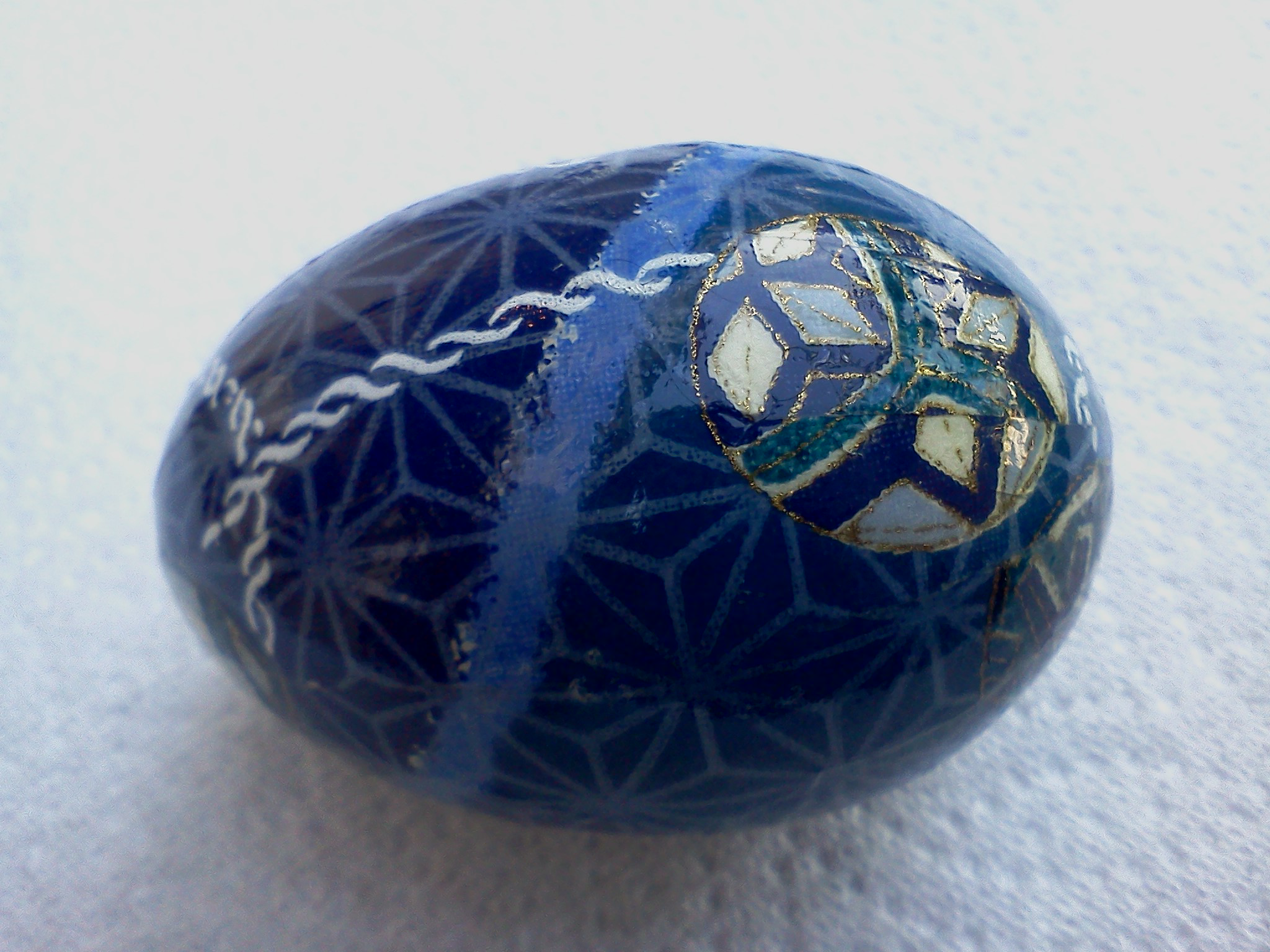
Washi egg from Japan

== Easter egg games ==
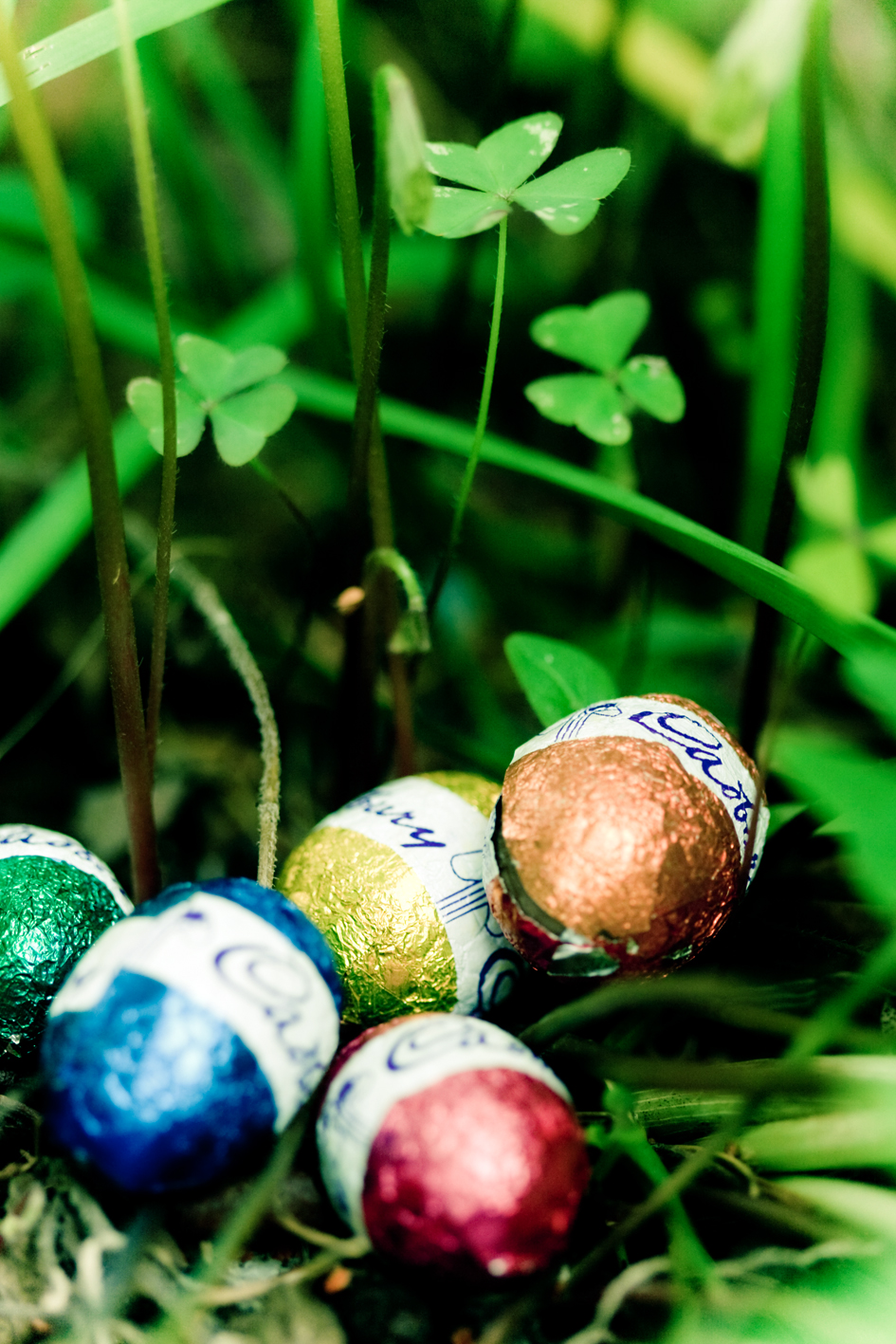
Eggs hidden for an Easter egg hunt

=== Egg hunts ===
An egg hunt is a game in which decorated eggs, which may be hard-boiled chicken eggs, chocolate eggs, or artificial eggs containing candies, are hidden for children to find. The eggs often vary in size, and may be hidden both indoors and outdoors. When the hunt is over, prizes may be given for the largest number of eggs collected, or for the largest or the smallest egg.

Some Central European nations (Czechs, Slovaks, etc.) have a tradition of men gathering eggs from women in return for whipping them with an easter whip and splashing them with water. The ritual is traditionally believed to preserve the women's health and beauty.

Cascarones, a Latin American tradition now shared by many US States with high Hispanic demographics, are emptied and dried chicken eggs stuffed with confetti and sealed with a piece of tissue paper. The eggs are hidden in a similar tradition to the American Easter egg hunt and when found the children (and adults) break them over each other's heads.

In order to enable children to take part in egg hunts despite visual impairment, eggs have been created that emit various clicks, beeps, noises, or music so that visually impaired children can easily hunt for Easter eggs.

=== Egg rolling ===
Egg rolling is also a traditional Easter Egg game played with eggs at Easter. In the United Kingdom, Germany, and other countries children traditionally rolled eggs down hillsides at Easter. This tradition was taken to the New World by European settlers, and continues to this day each Easter with an Easter egg roll on the White House lawn. Rutherford B. Hayes started the tradition of the Easter Egg Roll at the White House. The Easter Monday Egg Roll was normally held at the United States Capitol, however, by the mid-1870s, Congress passed a law forbidding the Capitol's grounds to be used for the activity due to the toll it was taking on the landscape. The law was enforced in 1877, but the rain that year canceled all outdoor activities. In 1878, Hayes was approached by many young Easter Egg rollers who asked for the event to be held at the White House. He invited any children who wanted to roll eggs to come to the White House in order to do so. The tradition still occurs every year on the South Lawn of the White House. Now, there are many other games and activities that take place such as "Egg Picking" and "Egg Ball". Different nations have different versions of the Easter Egg roll game.

=== Egg tapping ===
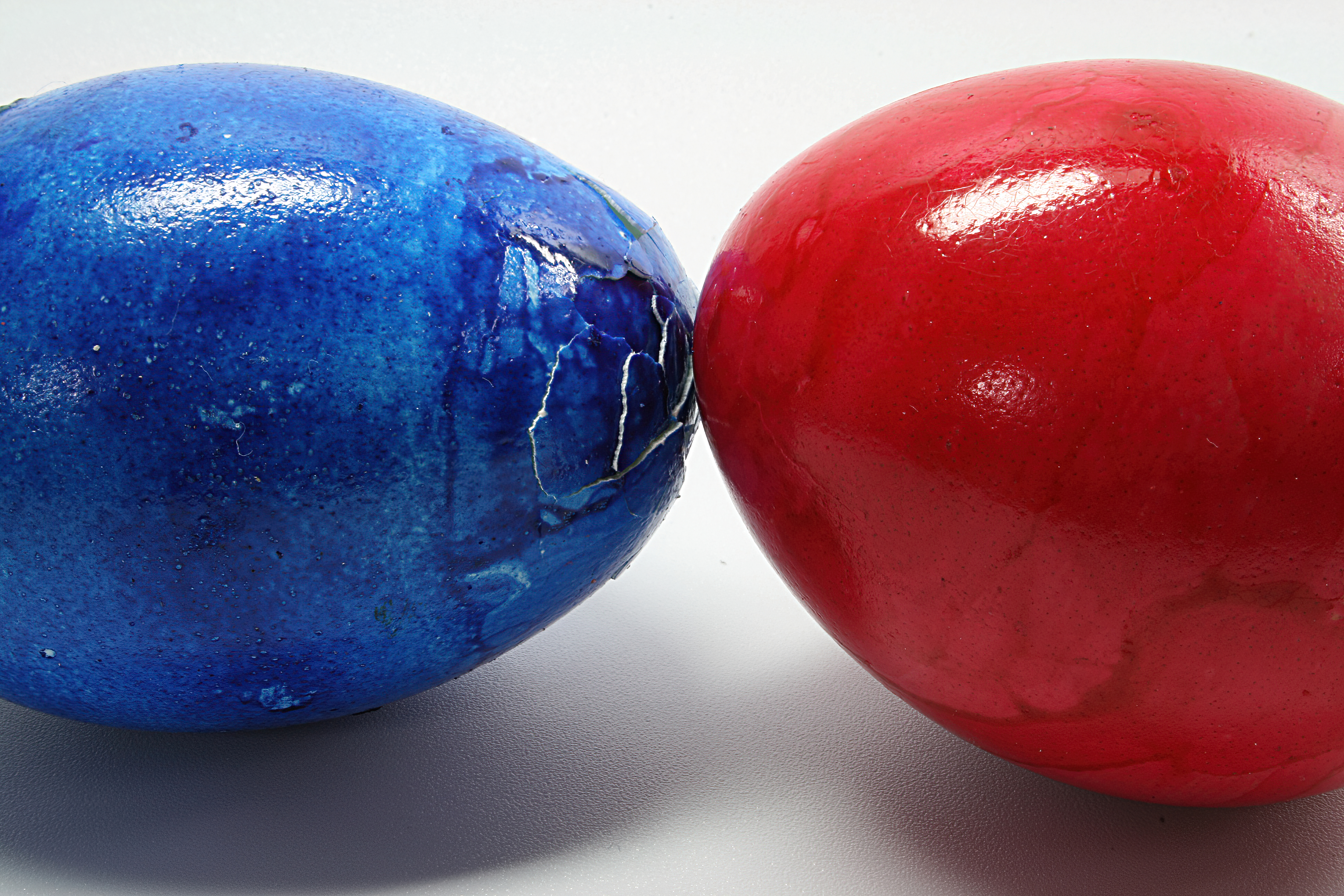
Eggs after an egg tapping competition (red wins)

In the North of England, during Eastertide, a traditional game is played where hard boiled pace eggs are distributed and each player hits the other player's egg with their own. This is known as "egg tapping", "egg dumping", or "egg jarping". The winner is the holder of the last intact egg. The annual egg jarping world championship is held every year over Easter in Peterlee, Durham.

It is also practiced in Italy (where it is called scuccetta), Poland, Belarus, Bulgaria, Hungary, Croatia, Latvia, Lithuania, Lebanon, North Macedonia, Romania, Serbia, Slovenia (where it is called turčanje or trkanje), Ukraine, Russia, and other countries. In parts of Austria, Bavaria and German-speaking Switzerland it is called Ostereiertitschen or Eierpecken. In parts of Europe it is also called epper, presumably from the German name Opfer, meaning "offering" and in Greece it is known as tsougrisma. In South Louisiana, this practice is called pocking eggs and is slightly different. The Louisiana Creoles hold that the winner eats the eggs of the losers in each round.

In the Greek Orthodox tradition, red eggs are also cracked together when people exchange Easter greetings.

=== Egg dance ===
Egg dance is a traditional Easter game in which eggs are laid on the ground or floor and the goal is to dance among them without damaging any eggs which originated in Germany.

=== Pace egg plays ===
The Pace Egg plays are traditional village plays, with a rebirth theme. The drama takes the form of a combat between the hero and villain, in which the hero is killed and brought back to life. The plays take place in England during Easter.

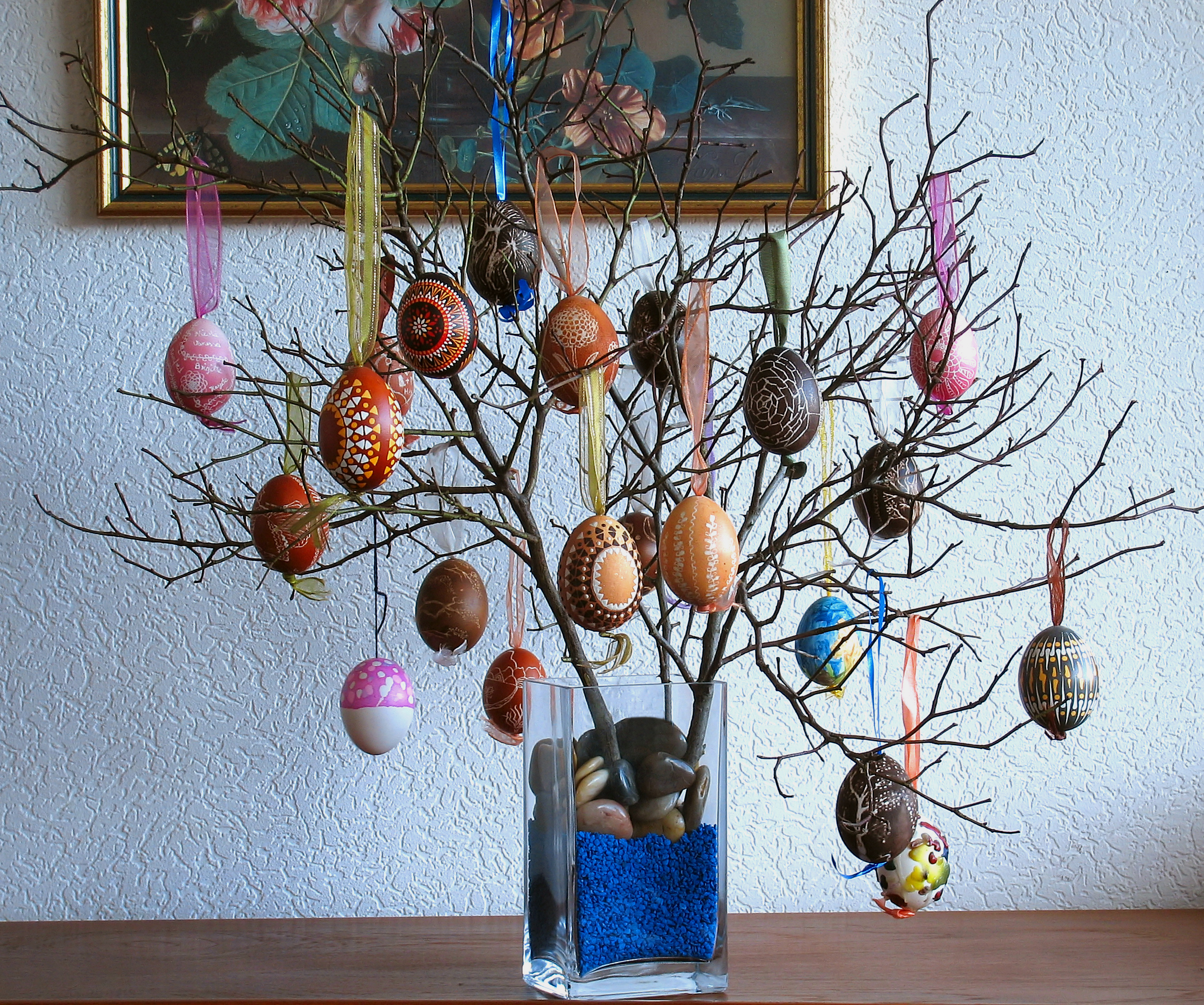
In some countries like Sweden, Norway, Poland, Slovakia and Germany eggs are used as a table decoration hanging on a tree-branch.

== Variants ==
=== Chocolate ===
Chocolate eggs first appeared at the court of Louis XIV in Versailles and in 1725 the widow Giambone in Turin started producing chocolate eggs by filling empty chicken egg shells with molten chocolate. In 1873, J.S. Fry & Sons produced the first hollow chocolate egg making a smooth paste that could be poured into egg moulds. Manufacturing their first Easter egg in 1875, Cadbury created the modern chocolate Easter egg after developing a pure cocoa butter that could be moulded into smooth shapes.

In Western cultures, the giving of chocolate eggs is now commonplace, with 80 million Easter eggs sold in the UK alone. Formerly, the containers Easter eggs were sold in contained large amounts of plastic, although in the United Kingdom this has gradually been replaced with recyclable paper and cardboard.

In Brazil, Argentina, Chile, Uruguay and Paraguay, hollow chocolate eggs known as Ovos de Páscoa or Huevos de Páscua (Easter eggs) are popular and are commonly sold around Easter in supermarkets. Variations of this dessert containing fillings such as pistachio cream, hazelnut cream, furrundu or doce de leite, are known as Ovos de Páscoa de colher (Spoon Easter eggs) or Ovos de colher (Spoon eggs).

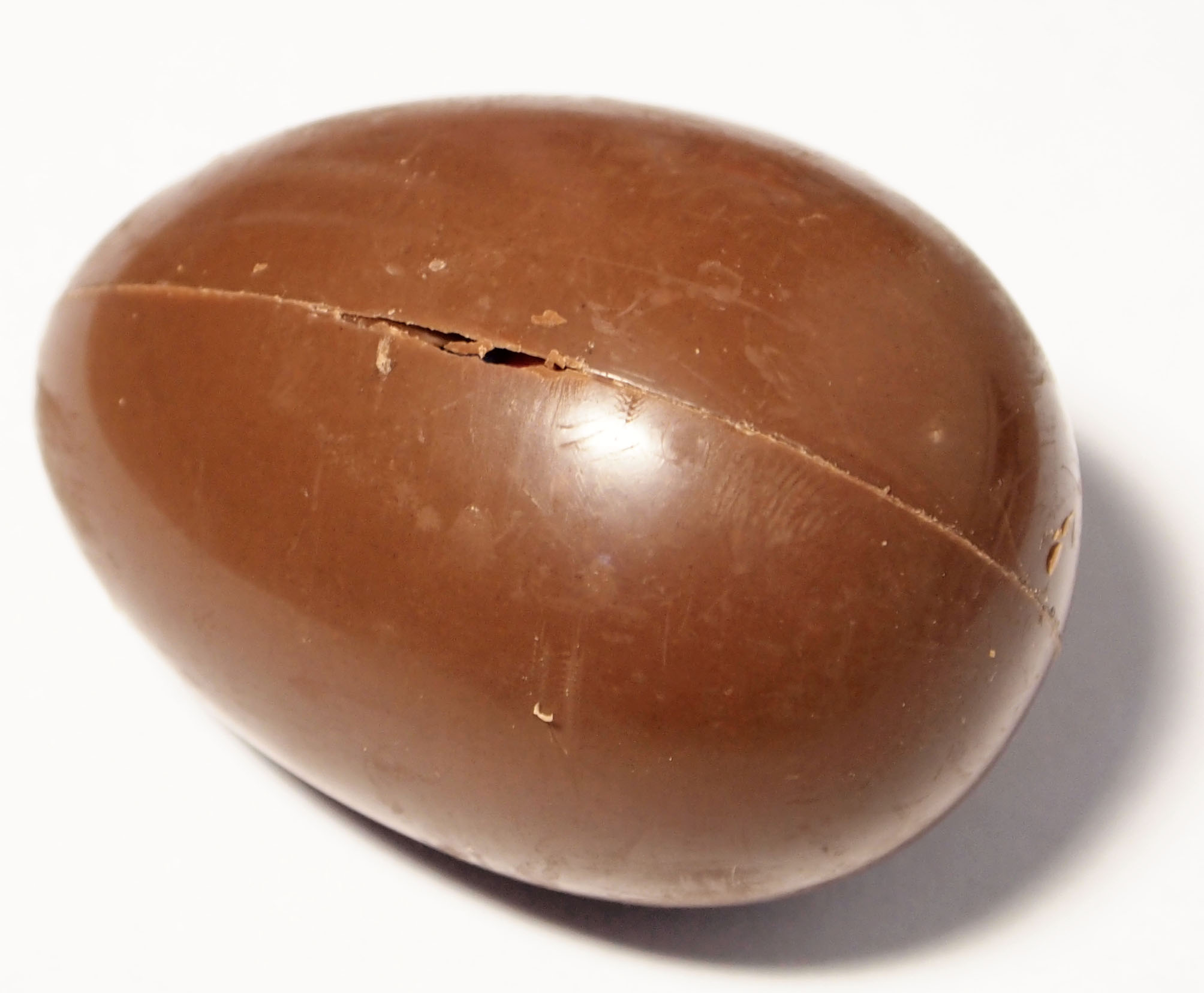
Hollow chocolate Easter egg

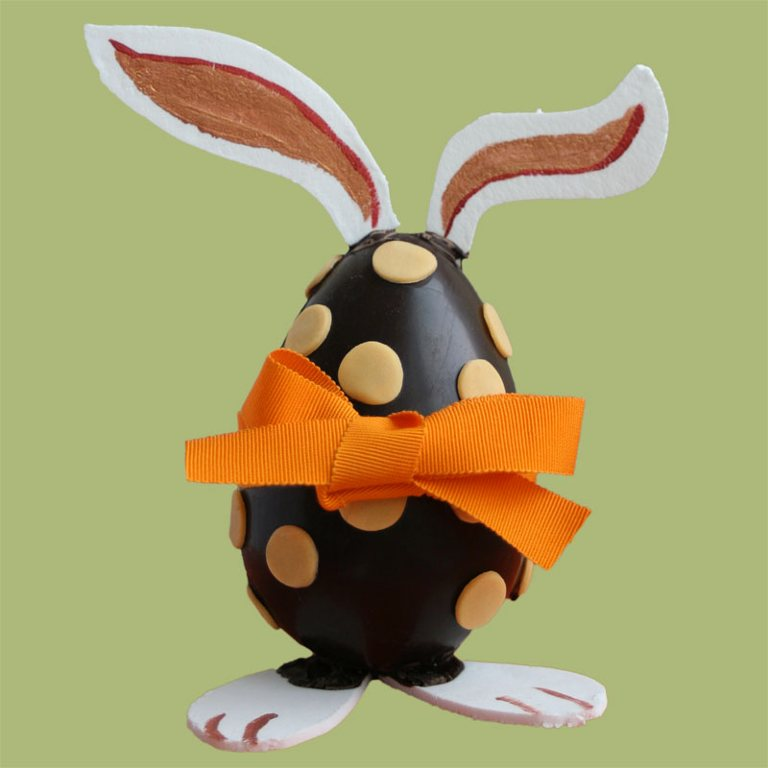
Chocolate Easter egg bunny

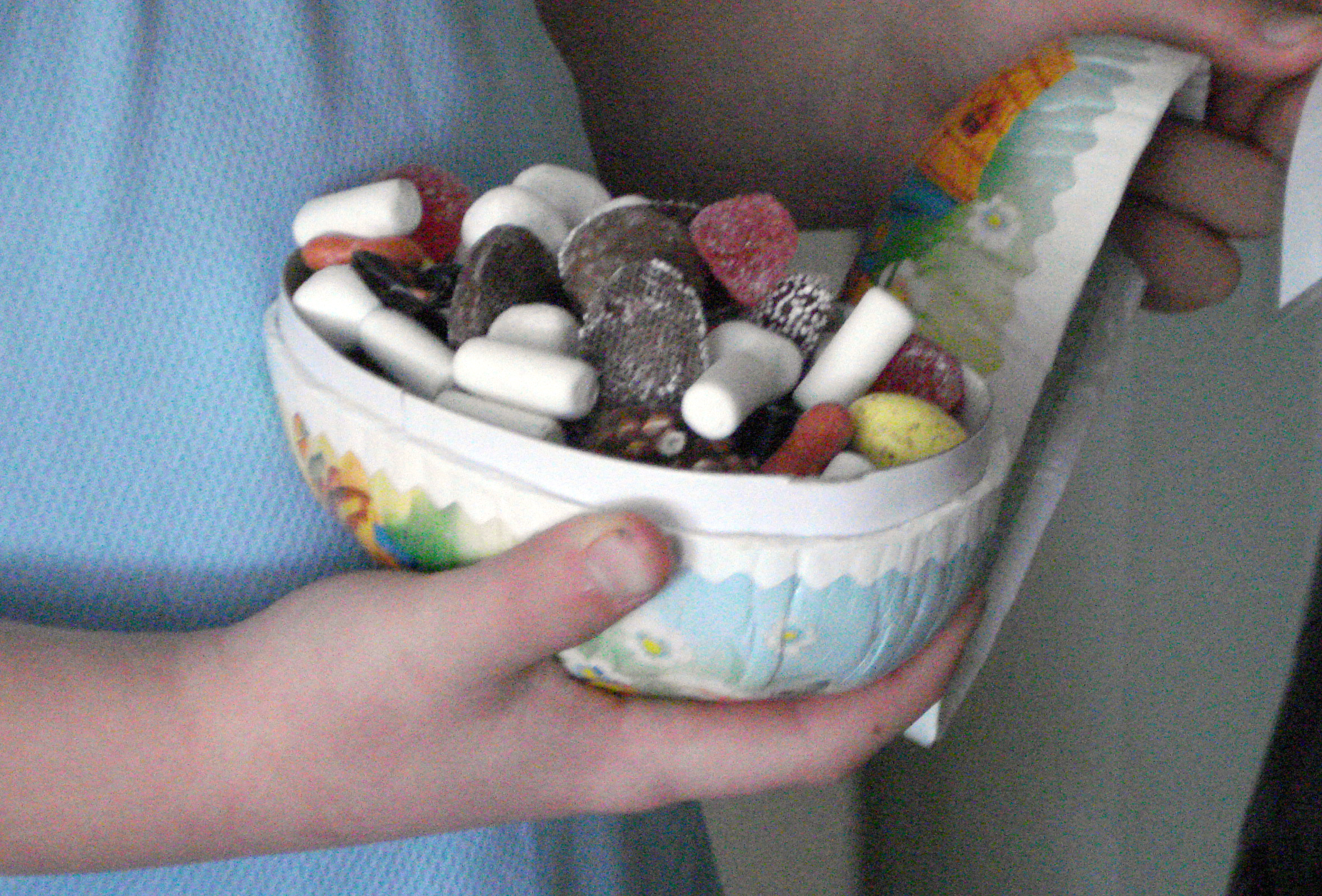
Easter egg with candy

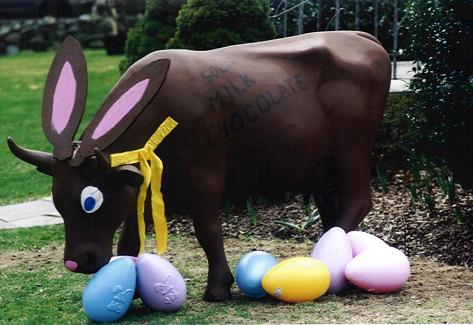
Gladys as a Chocolate Easter Bunny with Easter eggs

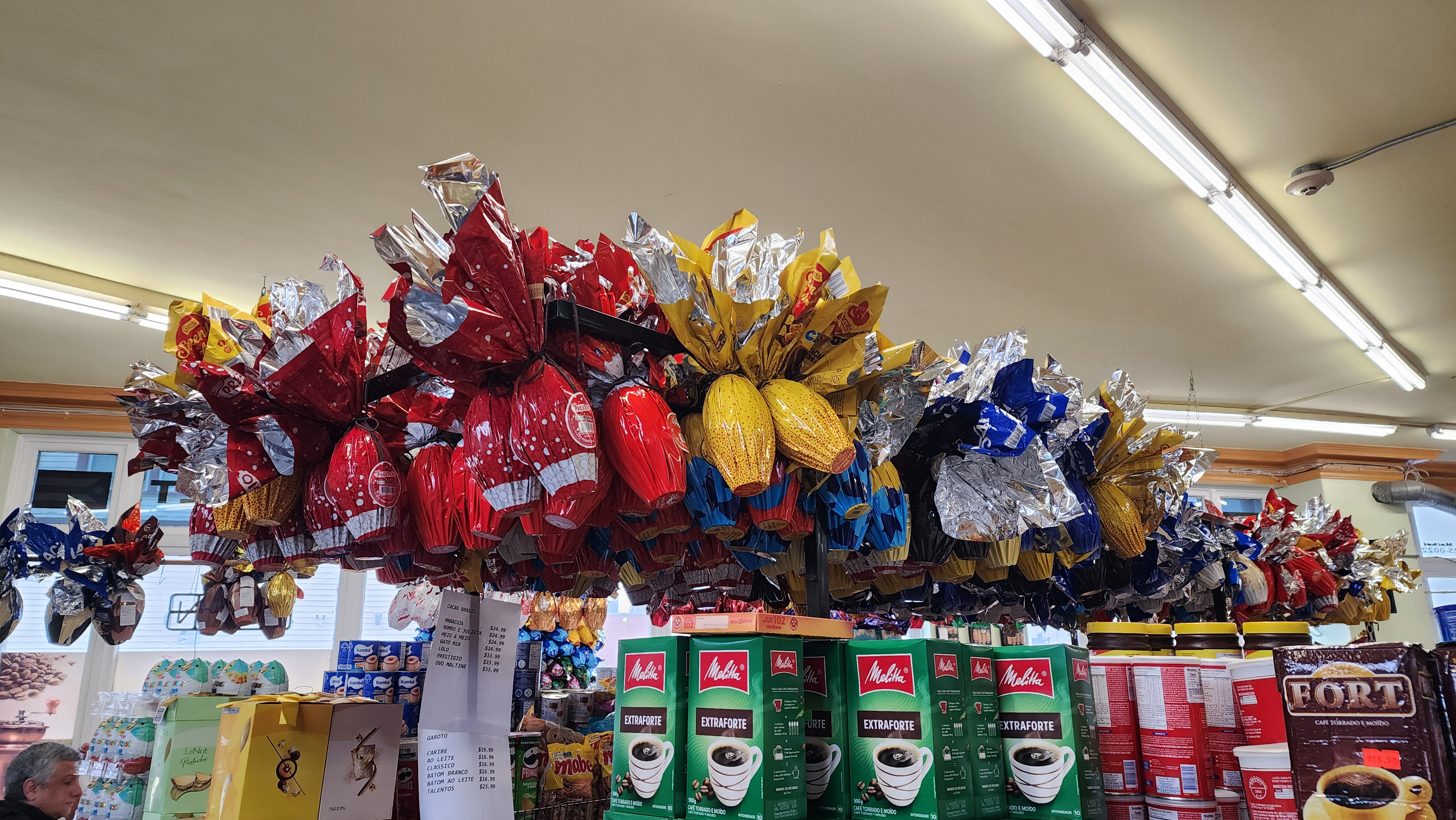
Brazilian Ovos de Páscoa for sale in a supermarket

=== Marzipan eggs ===
In the Indian state of Goa, the Goan Catholic version of marzipan is used to make easter eggs. In the Philippines, mazapán de pili (Spanish for "pili marzipan") is made from pili nuts.

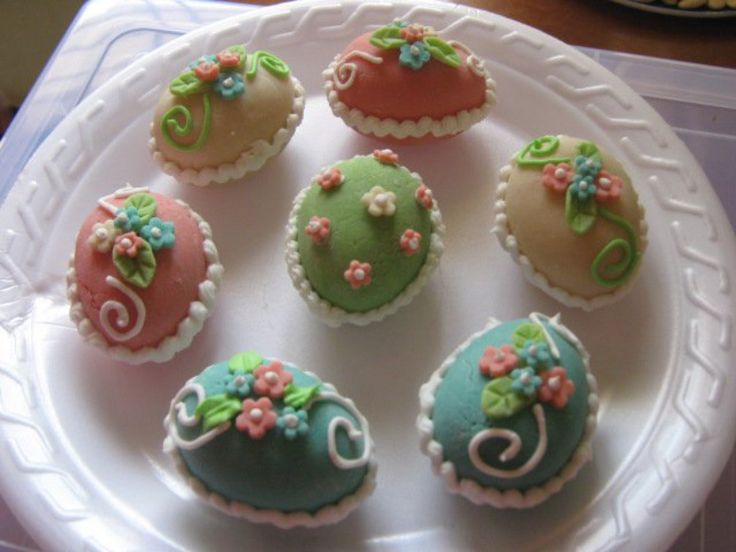
Marzipan easter eggs

=== Artificial eggs ===
The jewelled Easter eggs made by the Fabergé firm for the two last Russian Tsars are regarded as masterpieces of decorative arts. Most of these creations themselves contained hidden surprises such as clock-work birds, or miniature ships.

In Bulgaria, Poland, Romania, Russia, Ukraine, and other Central European countries' folk traditions, Easter eggs are carved from wood and hand-painted, and making artificial eggs out of porcelain for ladies is common.

Easter eggs are frequently depicted in sculpture, including a 8-metre (27 ft) sculpture of a pysanka standing in Vegreville, Alberta.

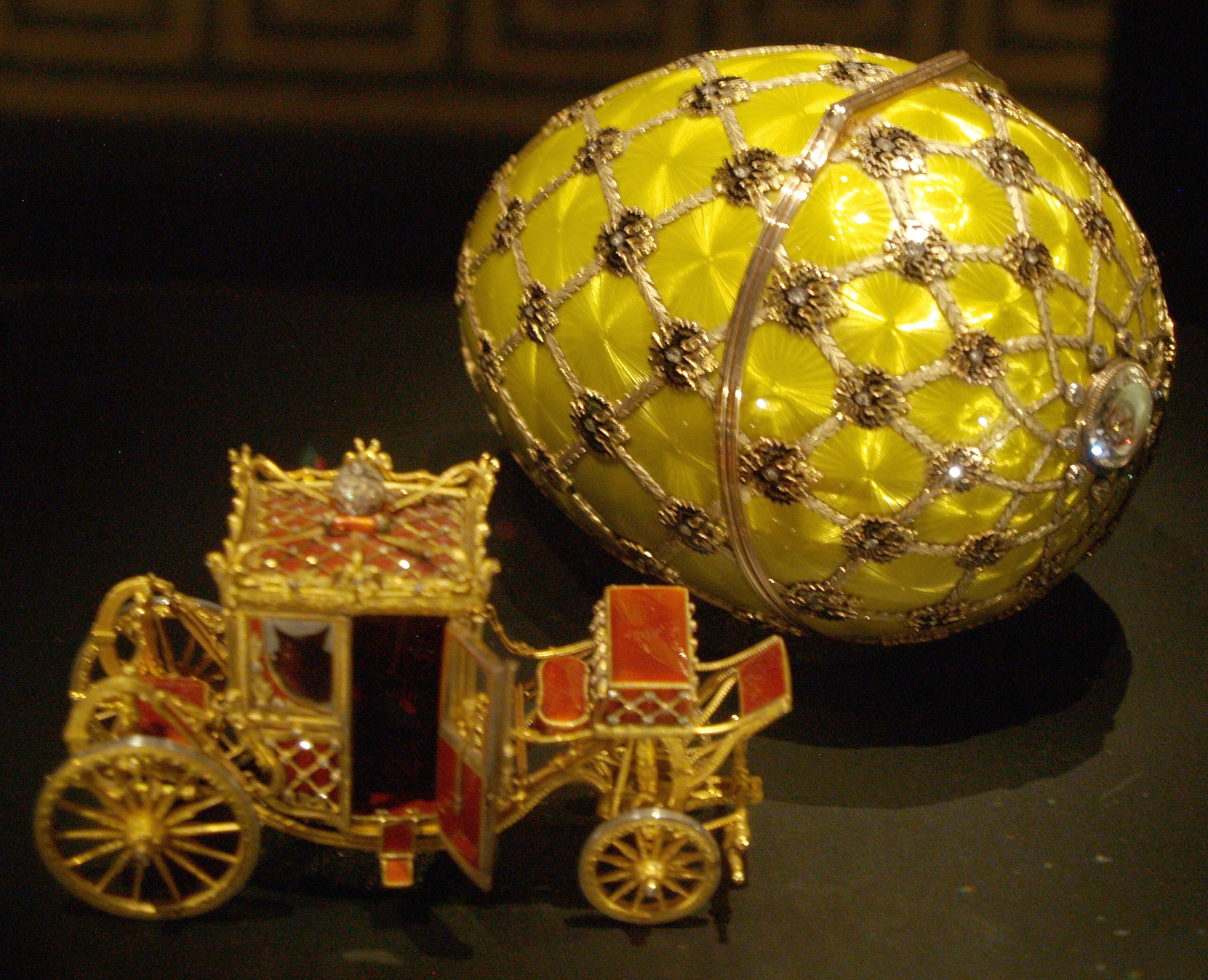
Fabergé egg

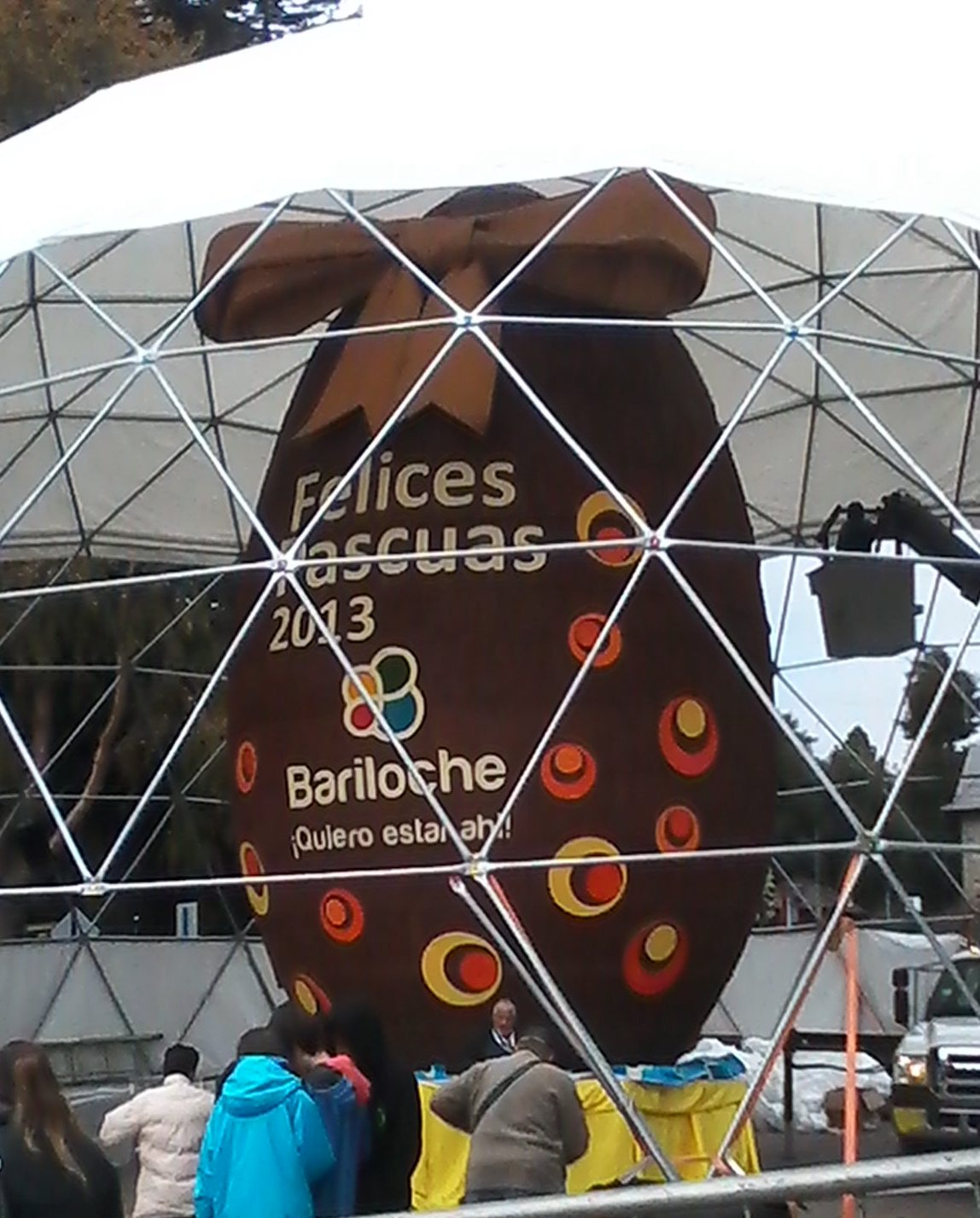
Giant easter egg, Bariloche, Argentina

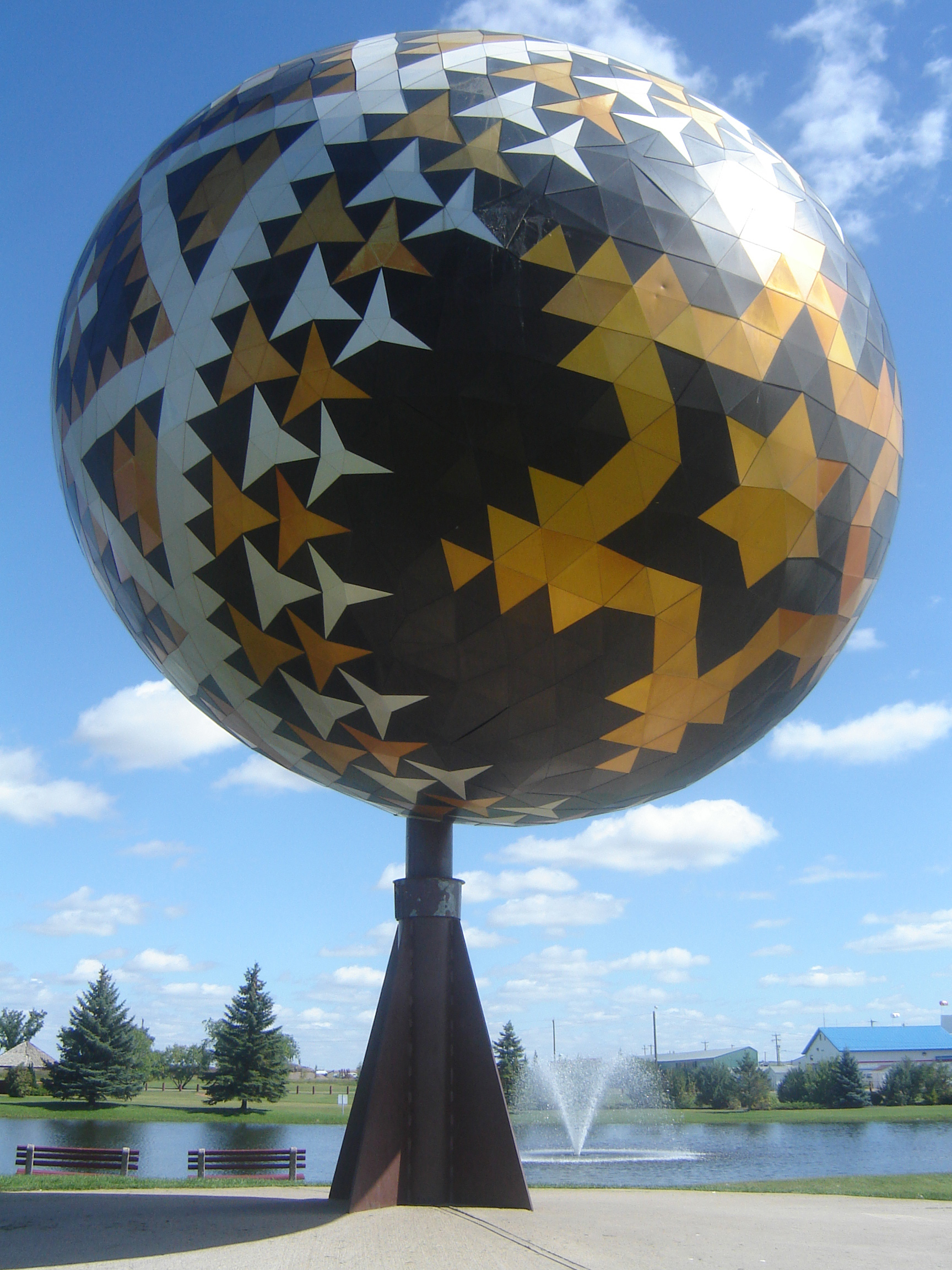
Giant pysanka from Vegreville, Alberta, Canada

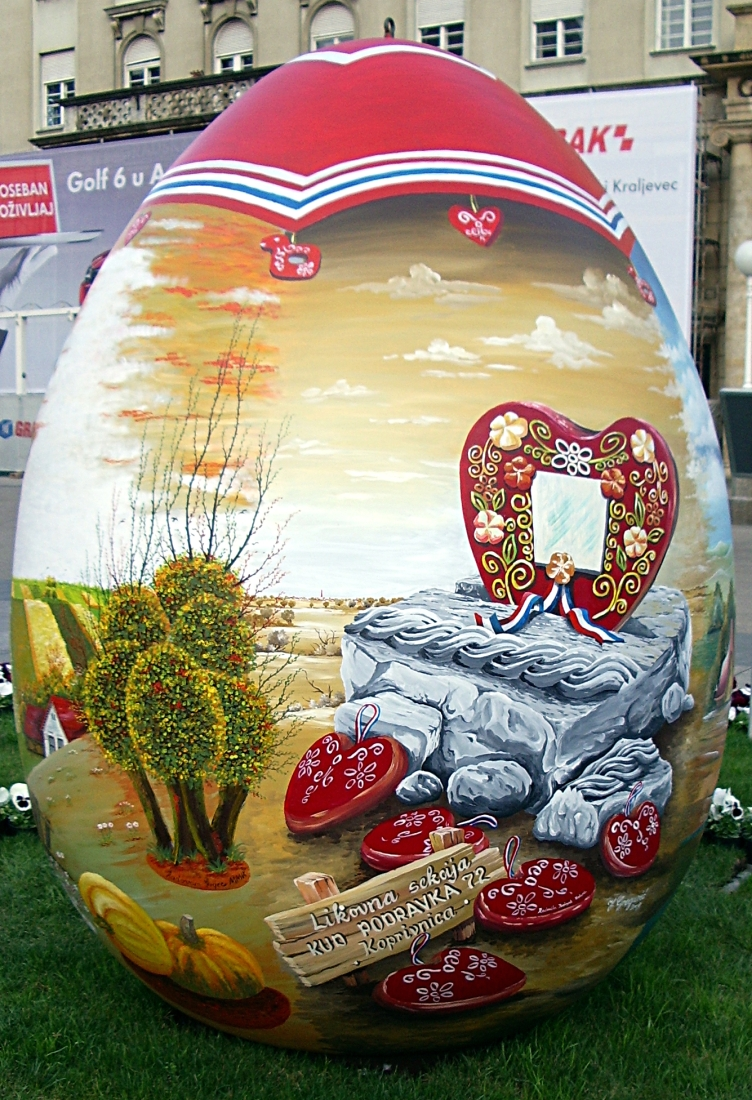
Giant easter egg or pisanica in Zagreb, Croatia

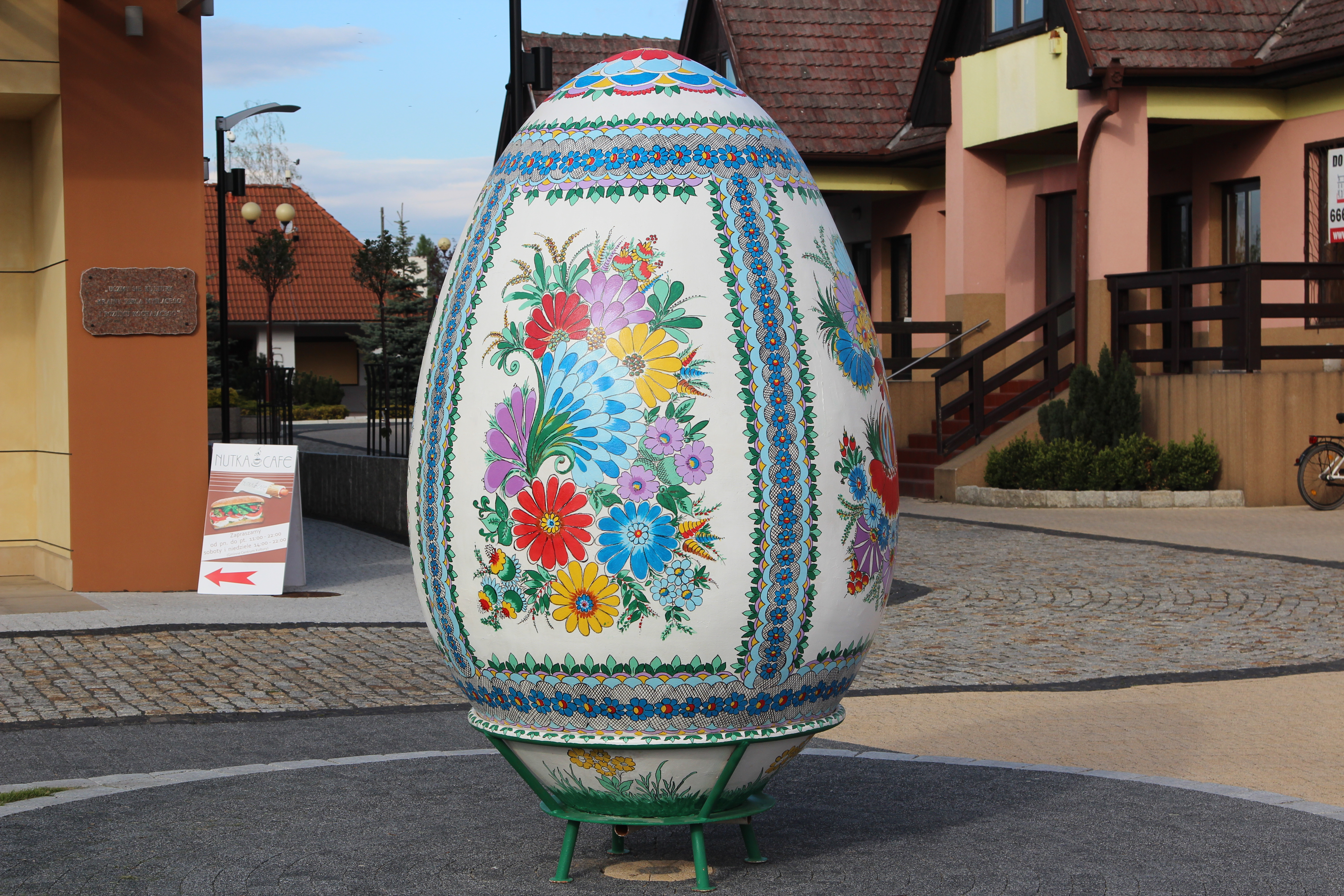
Easter egg sculpture in Gogolin, Poland

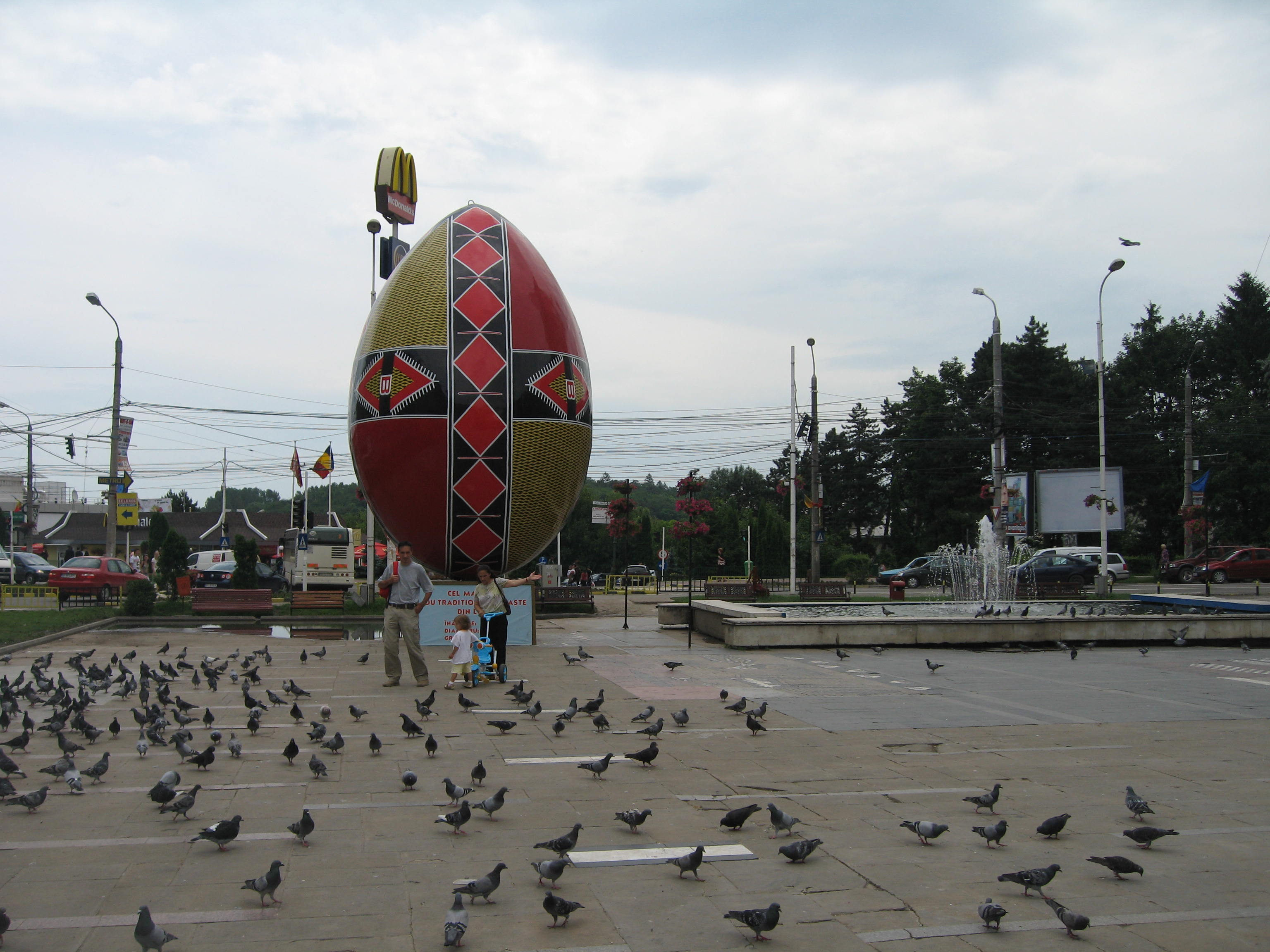
Giant easter egg in Suceava, Romania

== Legends ==
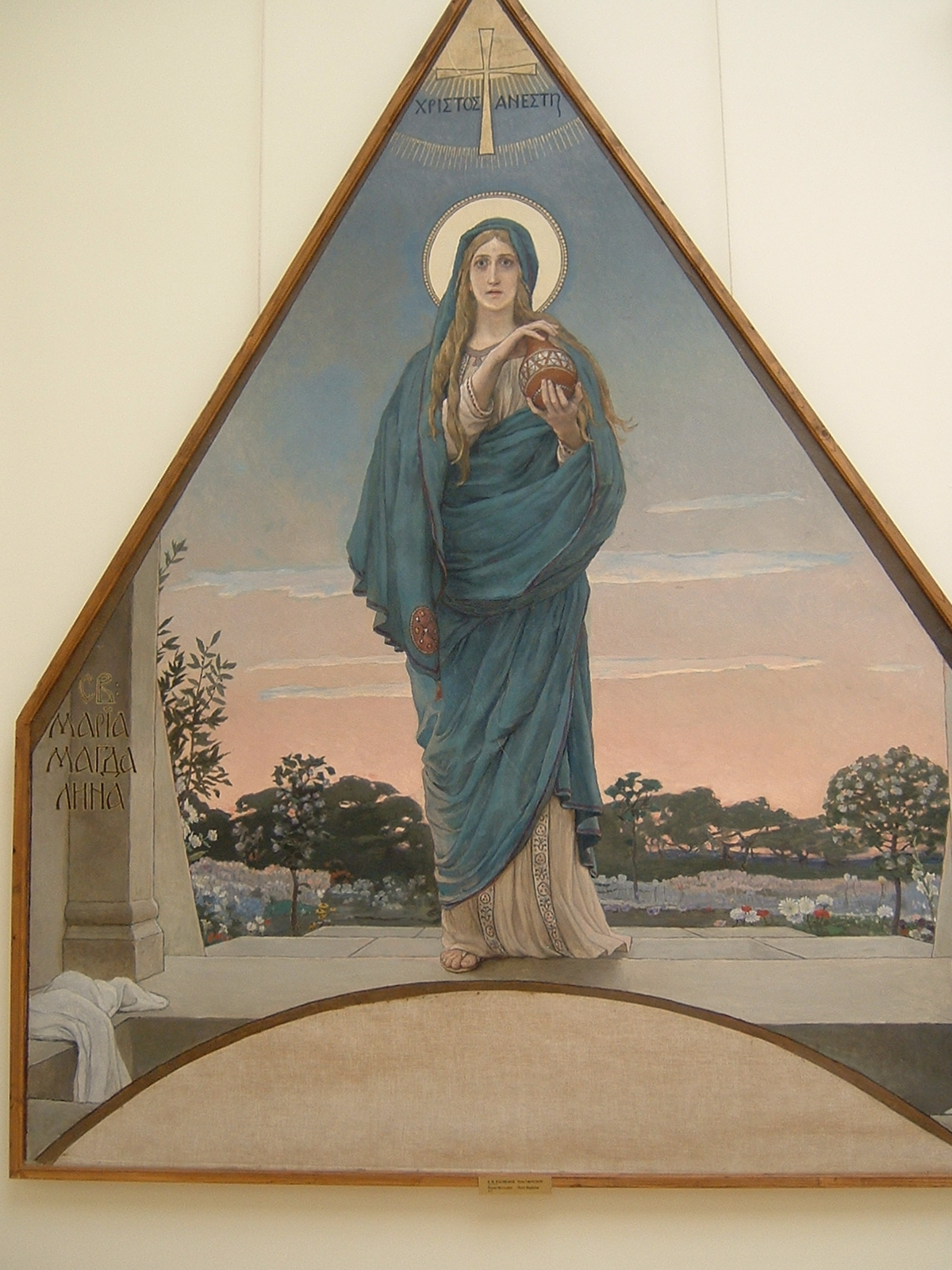
Maria Magdalene, 1899 by Viktor M. Vasnetsov, depicted as one of the Myrrhbearers

=== Christian traditions ===
While the origin of Easter eggs can be explained in the symbolic terms described above, among followers of Eastern Christianity the legend says that Mary Magdalene was bringing cooked eggs to share with the other women at the tomb of Jesus, and the eggs in her basket miraculously turned bright red when she saw the risen Christ.

A different, but not necessarily conflicting legend concerns Mary Magdalene's efforts to spread the Gospel. According to this tradition, after the Ascension of Jesus, Mary went to the Emperor of Rome and greeted him with "Christ has risen," whereupon he pointed to an egg on his table and stated, "Christ has no more risen than that egg is red." After making this statement it is said the egg immediately turned blood red.

Red Easter eggs, known as kokkina avga (κόκκινα αυγά) in Greece and krashanky in Ukraine, are an Easter tradition and a distinct type of Easter egg prepared by various Orthodox Christian peoples. The red eggs are part of Easter custom in many areas and often accompany other traditional Easter foods. Passover haminados are prepared with similar methods. Dark red eggs are a tradition in Greece and represent the blood of Christ shed on the cross. The practice dates to the early Christian church in Mesopotamia. In Greece, superstitions of the past included the custom of placing the first-dyed red egg at the home's iconostasis (place where icons are displayed) to ward off evil. The heads and backs of small lambs were also marked with the red dye to protect them.

=== Parallels in other faiths ===
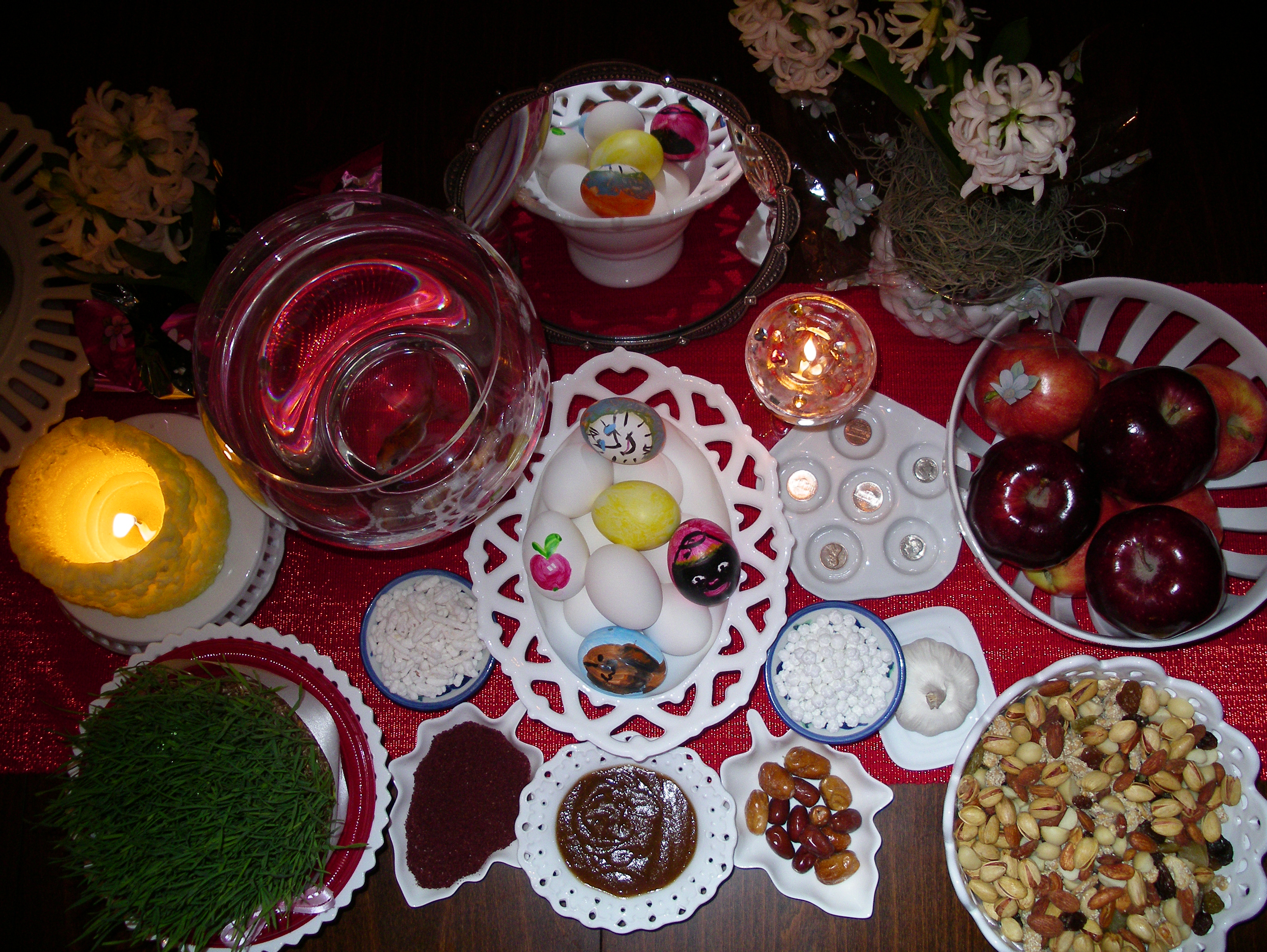
Eggs at the Iranian Nowruz

The egg is widely used as a symbol of the start of new life, just as new life emerges from an egg when the chick hatches out.

Painted eggs are used at the Iranian spring holidays, the Nowruz that marks the first day of spring or Equinox, and the beginning of the year in the Persian calendar. It is celebrated on the day of the astronomical Northward equinox, which usually occurs on 21 March or the previous/following day depending on where it is observed. The painted eggs symbolize fertility and are displayed on the Nowruz table, called Haft-Seen together with various other symbolic objects. There are sometimes one egg for each member of the family. The ancient Zoroastrians painted eggs for Nowruz, their New Year celebration, which falls on the Spring equinox. The tradition continues among Persians of Islamic, Zoroastrian, and other faiths today. The Nowruz tradition has existed for at least 2,500 years. The sculptures on the walls of Persepolis show people carrying eggs for Nowruz to the king.

The Neopagan holiday of Ostara occurs at roughly the same time as Easter. While it is often claimed that the use of painted eggs is an ancient, pre-Christian component of the celebration of Ostara, there are no historical accounts that ancient celebrations included this practice, apart from the Old High German lullaby which is believed by most to be a modern fabrication. Rather, the use of painted eggs has been adopted under the assumption that it might be a pre-Christian survival. In fact, modern scholarship has been unable to trace any association between eggs and a supposed goddess named Ostara before the 19th century, when early folklorists began to speculate about the possibility.

There are good grounds for the association between hares (later termed Easter Bunnies) and bird eggs, through folklore confusion between hares' forms (where they raise their young) and plovers' nests.

In Judaism, a hard-boiled egg is an element of the Passover Seder, representing festival sacrifice. The children's game of hunting for the afikomen (a half-piece of matzo) has similarities to the Easter egg hunt tradition, by which the child who finds the hidden matzah will be awarded a prize. In other homes, the children hide the afikoman and a parent must look for it; when the parents give up, the children demand a prize for revealing its location.

== See also ==
- Balut
- Century egg
- Chinese red eggs
- Cascarón
- Easter Bilby
- Egg decorating in Slavic culture
- Festum Ovorum
- Kinder Surprise
- List of egg dishes
- List of foods with religious symbolism
- Resurrection of Jesus
- Salted duck egg
- Sham El Nessim
- Smoked egg
- Tea egg
- Vegreville egg
- Washi eggs
