= Festum Ovorum =

Saturday before Ash Wednesday

- Also called: Egg Saturday, Egg Feast,
- Date: Saturday before Ash Wednesday
- Frequency: annual

Egg Saturday, Egg Feast, or Festum Ovorum is the Saturday before Ash Wednesday.

At the University of Oxford, pasch eggs have been provided to students on that day.
