= Furrundu =

Brazilian papaya confectionary

- Alternative names: Furrundum, Furrundú
- Type: Confectionary
- Place of origin: Brazil
- Region or state: Mato Grosso
- Main ingredients: Green papaya and melted rapadura

Furrundu is a spreadable Brazilian confectionery that is traditional to the Baixada Cuiabana and Pantanal regions of Mato Grosso. Made of either green papaya or papaya tree bark and melted rapadura, it can be seasoned with various spices such as ginger, cloves, and cinnamon.

According to historian Aníbal Alencastro, furrundu was developed during the Paraguayan War when the borders of Mato Grosso were closed and naval shipments traveling up the Paraguay River were halted. A lack of foreign ingredients forced the citizens of Mato Grosso to develop dishes using solely local ingredients.

In 2018, a furrundu-flavored artisanal Brazilian beer produced in Cuiabá won 3rd place in the American Stout category at the Copa Cervezas de América.
