= Easter traditions =

Traditions of the Easter holiday

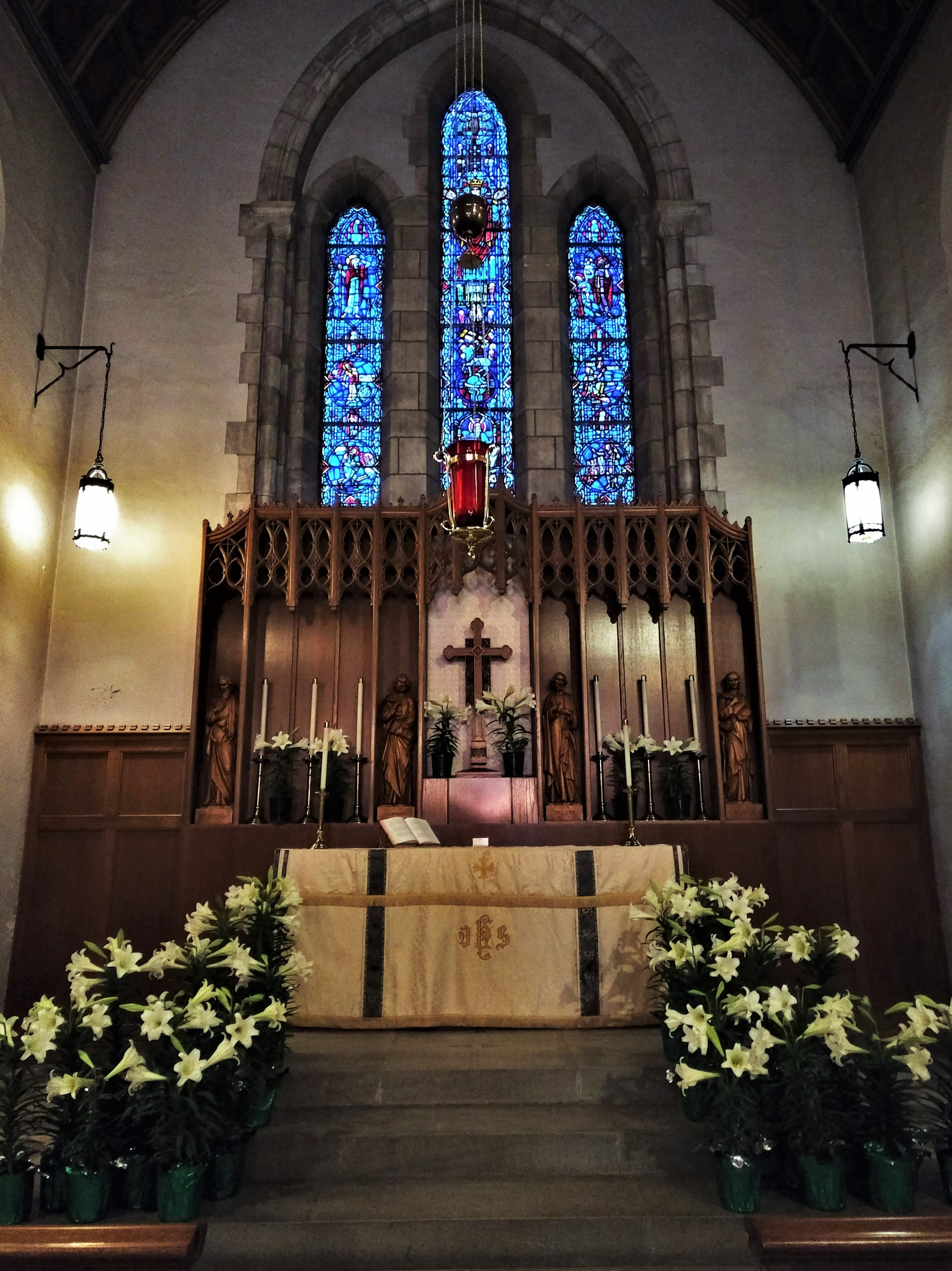
Easter lilies, a symbol of the resurrection, adorning the chancel in a Lutheran church in Baltimore

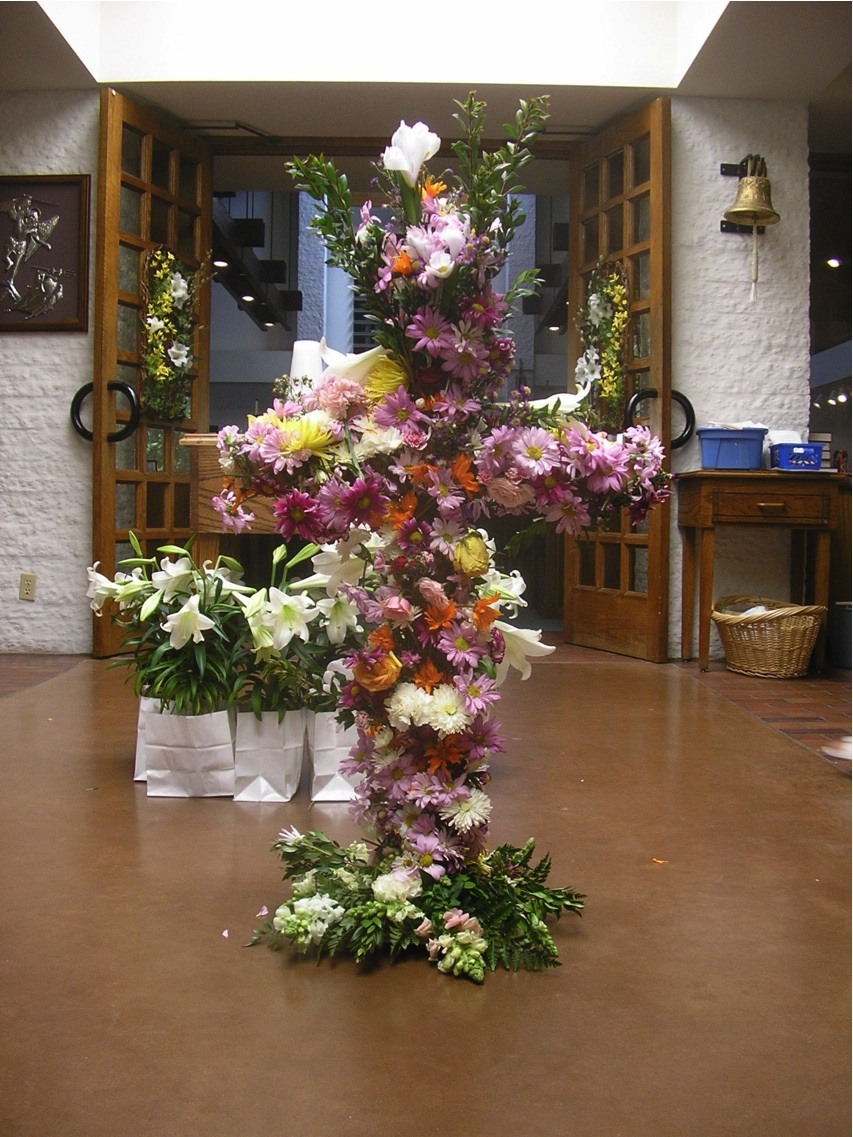
Flowered cross prepared for Easter Sunday

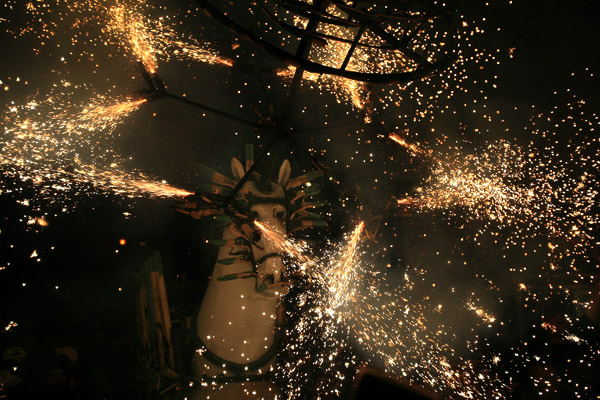
The Cavallo di fuoco in Ripatransone, Abruzzo, Italy, in action

Easter traditions (also known as Paschal traditions) are customs and practices that are followed in various cultures and communities around the world to celebrate Easter (also known as Pascha or Resurrection Sunday), which is the central feast in Christianity, commemorating the resurrection of Jesus. The Easter season is seen as a time of celebration and feasting, in contrast to the antecedent season of Lent, which is a time of penitence and fasting.

Easter traditions include sunrise services or late-night vigils, exclamations and exchanges of Paschal greetings, flowering the cross, the wearing of Easter bonnets by women, clipping the church, and the decoration and the communal breaking of Easter eggs (a symbol of the empty tomb). The Easter lily, a symbol of the resurrection in Christianity, traditionally decorates the chancel area of churches on this day and for the rest of Eastertide. There are also traditional Easter foods that vary by region and culture. Many traditional Easter games and customs developed, such as egg rolling, egg tapping, and cascarones or confetti eggs. Egg hunting, originating in the idea of searching for the empty tomb, is an activity that remains popular among children. Today Easter is commercially important, seeing wide sales of greeting cards and confectionery such as chocolate Easter eggs.

== Games ==
There are a large number of traditional Easter games and customs in the Christian world. Many of these games incorporate Easter eggs, a symbol of the empty tomb. Of these the most well known, widespread and popular until the modern times are the egg rolling, egg hunt, egg tapping, and egg dance. Their rules may vary in different cultures and localities. At the same time, there exist less known peculiar customs. Nowadays child entertainers and kindergartens invent various new Easter games, often adapting well-known games to Easter topics, such as word puzzles involving Easter-related words.

=== Egg games ===
- The rules of egg rolling may vary significantly, with the basic idea being an egg race. The eggs are either rolled down a steep hill or pushed across a lawn with sticks.
- Egg hunt is a kind of treasure hunt game: children have to collect as many hidden eggs as possible.
- Egg tapping is a contest for the hardest egg: the contestants tap each other's eggs with egg tips and optionally with other parts: "butts" or sides.
- Egg dance requires dancing among eggs while keeping them undamaged. In some traditions the egg dancer may be blindfolded.
- Egg tossing or egg throwing is a game associated with Easter. Various types of such games exist, common ones involve throwing an egg so that it lands on the ground without breaking.

== Food ==
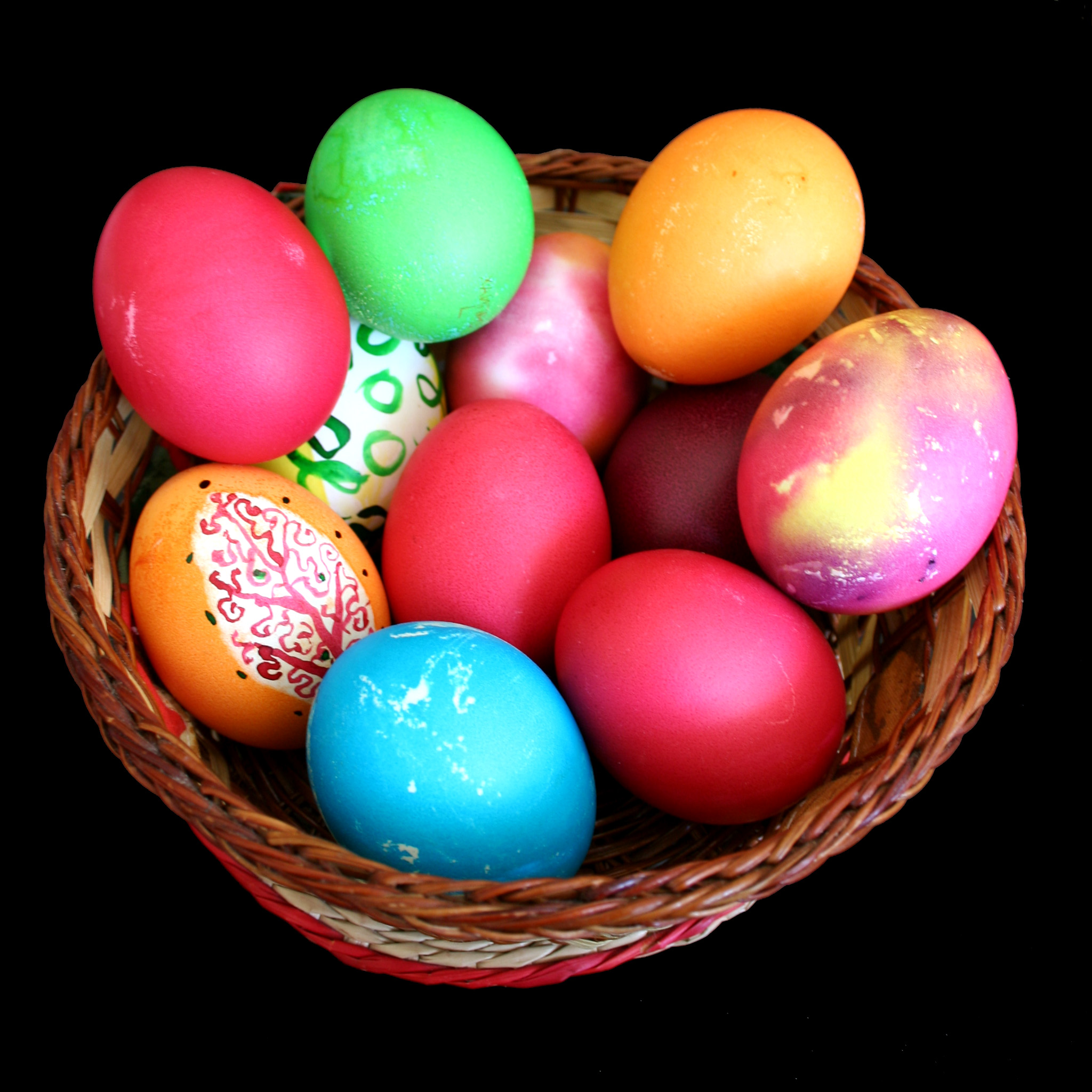
Decorated Easter eggs

The holiday of Easter is associated with various Easter foods (food traditions that vary regionally). Preparing, coloring, and decorating Easter eggs is one such popular tradition. Lamb is eaten in many countries, mirroring the Jewish Passover meal. Eating lamb at Easter has a religious meaning. The Paschal Lamb of the New Testament is in fact, for Christianity, the son of God Jesus Christ. The Paschal Lamb, in particular, represents the sacrifice of Jesus Christ for the sins of humanity. Eating lamb at Easter therefore commemorates the Death and Resurrection of Jesus.

The egg is an ancient symbol of new life and rebirth. In Christianity it became associated with Jesus's crucifixion and resurrection. The custom of the Easter egg originated in the early Christian community of Mesopotamia, who stained eggs red in memory of the blood of Christ, shed at his crucifixion. As such, for Christians, the Easter egg is a symbol of the empty tomb. The oldest tradition is to use dyed chicken eggs.

== Africa ==
=== Ethiopia and Eritrea ===
Easter, known as Fasika (Ge'ez: ፋሲካ, sometimes transcribed as Fasica; from Greek Pascha), also called Tensae (Ge'ez: ትንሣኤ, "to rise") is celebrated among Ethiopian and Eritrean Christians.

In Ethiopia, the most prominent and longstanding religion has been the Ethiopian Orthodox Tewahedo Church (then including the Eritrean Orthodox Tewahedo Church) since the times of Frumentius. Ethiopian (Ethio-Eritrean, Eastern) Easter, or Fasika, however, takes place in all the Christian Churches throughout the country, whether it be Orthodox, Catholic, or Protestant, and follows the eastern method of calculating Easter (see Computus for details), thus tending to fall after Easter in the Western calendar (some years both fall on the same date). Fasika is a much more important festival than Christmas, since the Death and Resurrection of Jesus is more significant in Orthodox and Ethiopian Evangelical theology than his birth. Jesus' crucifixion which led to his death on a Friday, according to Orthodox thought was for the purpose of fulfilling the word of God, and led to the conquest of death and Jesus' resurrection from the tomb after three days, the third day being the Sunday when Ethiopian Easter is celebrated.

Fasika is a climactic celebration. Fasting becomes more intense over the 55-day period of Lent for Orthodox Christians, Catholics and optionally for some Protestant denominations, when no meat or animal products of any kind, including milk and butter, are eaten. Good Friday starts off by church going, and is a day of preparation for the breaking of this long fasting period.

The Orthodox Christians prostrate themselves in church, bowing down and rising up until they get tired. The main religious service takes place with the Paschal Vigil on Saturday night. It is a somber, sacred occasion with music and dancing until the early hours of the morning. At 3:00 a.m. everyone returns home to break their fast, and a chicken is slaughtered at midnight for the symbolic occasion. In the morning, after a rest, a sheep is slaughtered to start the feasting on Easter Sunday. While Catholics and Protestant denominations have special Easter Services/Masses bringing in people from various smaller community churches together to participate in an Easter sermon and celebration.

In Ethiopian-Eritrean Orthodox Christianity or the Tewahedo faith, it is believed the near-sacrifice of Abraham's loved son Isaac (Genesis 22), which was a test of faith from God to Abraham, was interrupted by a voice of an angel from the heavens, and the sending of a Lamb for the sacrifice instead. This Old Testament story is said to be a prophetic foreshadowing of God sending his only beloved son for the world as a sacrifice and the fulfilling of Abraham's promise.

Easter in Ethiopia, Eritrea, and its diaspora communities, is a day when people celebrate; there is a release of enjoyment after the long build-up of suffering which has taken place, to represent Christ's fasting for forty days and forty nights. People often have food and for most Orthodox Christians locally brewed alcohol from fresh honey (tej, tella and katikalla), while to a certain extent Ethiopian-Eritrean Protestantism generally discourages heavy alcohol.

Ethiopians and Eritreans in the West especially those of the Catholic and Protestant denominations celebrate Easter on both the Eastern and Western days. While most Ethiopian-Eritrean Orthodox Christians in the West refrain from doing so because celebrating the Western Easter celebration would interfere with the Orthodox Eastern Fasting Season. In most cases the Catholic Western Fasting Season ends earlier than the Orthodox Eastern Fasting Season as can be seen in the difference between when the Eastern and Western Churches celebrate Easter (Fasika).

=== Nigeria ===
Since the arrival of Christianity in Nigeria with the missionaries that came to the country from the early 1800s, Easter has been observed among the Christian population.

=== Ghana ===
Easter is a significant Christian festival celebrated with zeal and fervour in Ghana. The festival is usually held over four days, from Good Friday to Easter Monday.Good Friday is usually observed as a solemn day of reflection and repentance in Ghana. Many Christians attend church services to reflect on Jesus Christ’s crucifixion and sacrifice for humanity’s sins. Some people fast on this day, going without food and drink until the evening.

== Asia ==
=== Malaysia ===
Despite Malaysia being a Muslim majority country, Easter is celebrated in the states of Sabah and Sarawak in East Malaysia as there is a significant Christian indigenous population in both states.

== The Americas ==
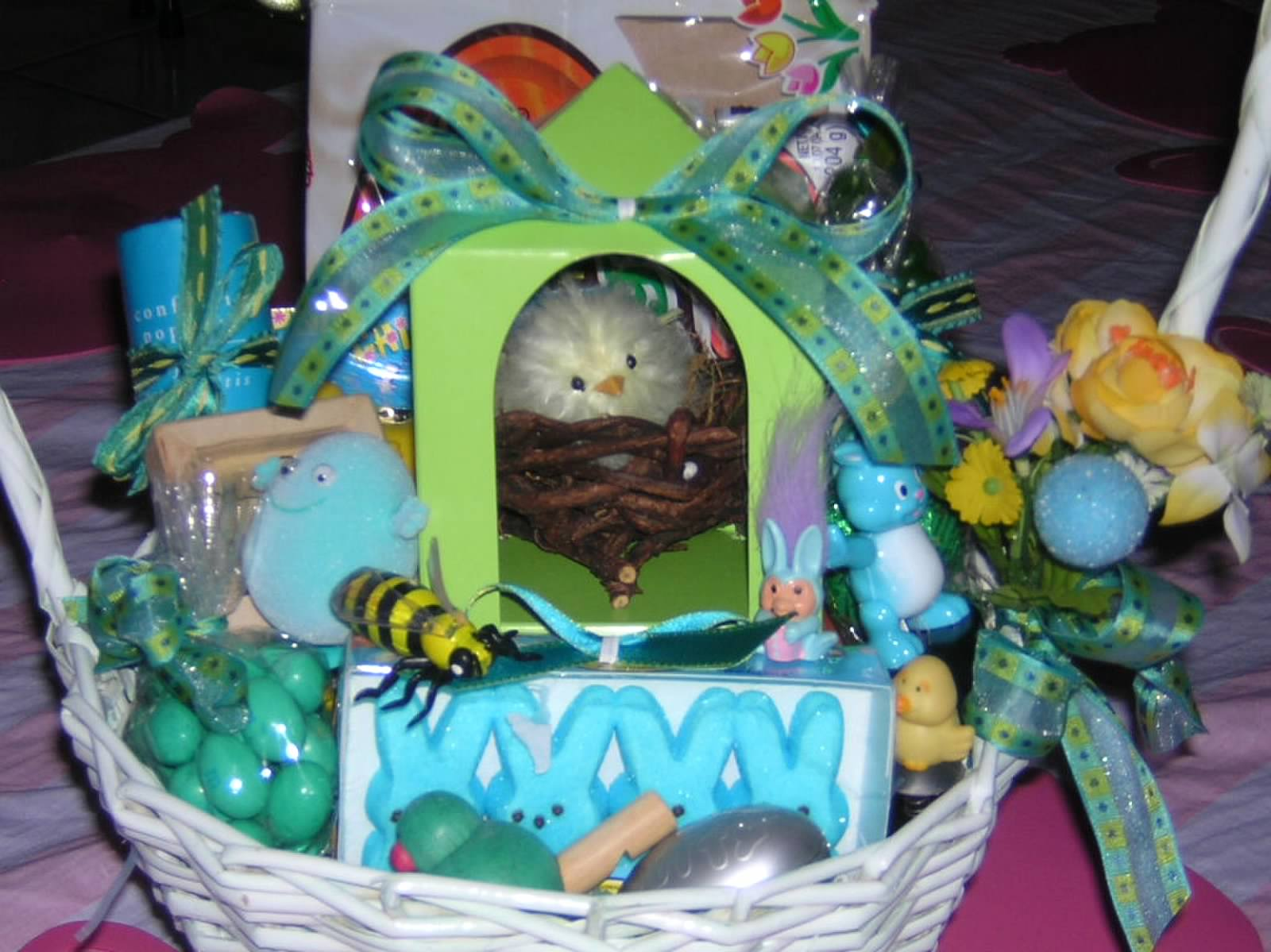
Marshmallow bunnies and candy eggs in an Easter basket. In many cultures rabbits, which represent fertility, are a symbol of Easter.

=== Bermuda ===
In the British Overseas Territory of Bermuda, historically famous for growing and exporting the Easter lily, the most notable feature of the Easter celebration is the flying of kites to symbolize Christ's ascent. Traditional Bermuda kites are constructed by Bermudians of all ages as Easter approaches, and are normally only flown at Easter. In addition to hot cross buns and Easter eggs, fish cakes are traditionally eaten in Bermuda at this time.

=== Jamaica ===
In Jamaica, eating bun and cheese is a highly anticipated custom by Jamaican nationals all over the world. The Jamaica Easter Buns are spiced and have raisins, and baked in a loaf tin. The buns are sliced and eaten with a slice of cheese. It is a common practice for employers to make gifts of bun and cheese or a single loaf of bun to staff members. According to the Jamaica Gleaner, "The basic Easter bun recipe requires wheat flour, brown sugar, molasses, baking powder or yeast and dried fruits." Easter egg traditions and the Easter Bunny activities are not widespread in Jamaica. Also, Jamaican traditions sometimes include throwing garlic onto the floor as a sign of good luck during Easter dinner.

=== United States ===
In Louisiana, USA, egg tapping is known as egg-knocking. Marksville, Louisiana claims to host the oldest egg-knocking competition in the US, dating back to the 1950s. Competitors pair up on the steps of the courthouse on Easter Sunday and knock the tips of two eggs together. If a participant's egg shell cracks they have to forfeit it, a process that continues until just one egg remains. Venetia Newall describes egg eating competitions in western Germany and among German emigrants to Pennsylvania, United States.

== Europe ==
=== Cyprus ===
As well as the common painted easter egg hunt, in Cyprus it is customary for people to light great fires (Greek: λαμπρατζια) in schools or church yards. The fires are made up of scrap wood, gathered usually by enthusiastic young boys which scour their neighbourhoods for them, in order to make their fire as great as it can be (and bigger than the neighbouring one). More than often this competition leads to fights happening over scraps of wood and the police or fire department being called to put out the fires that have gone out of control. It is customary for a small doll representing Judas Iscariot to be burnt. The same thing happens on Crete, but it is non-competitive, and the fire is called "founara" which means "big fire" in Cretan Greek. The founara burns coupled with the detonation of small dynamites called "plakatzikia" in plural, and with gunshots in the air.

=== Eastern Europe ===
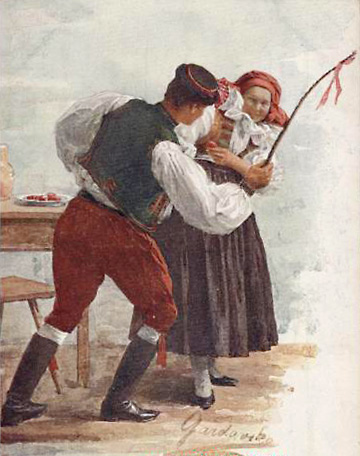
Ritual whipping of girls in Moravia (1910)

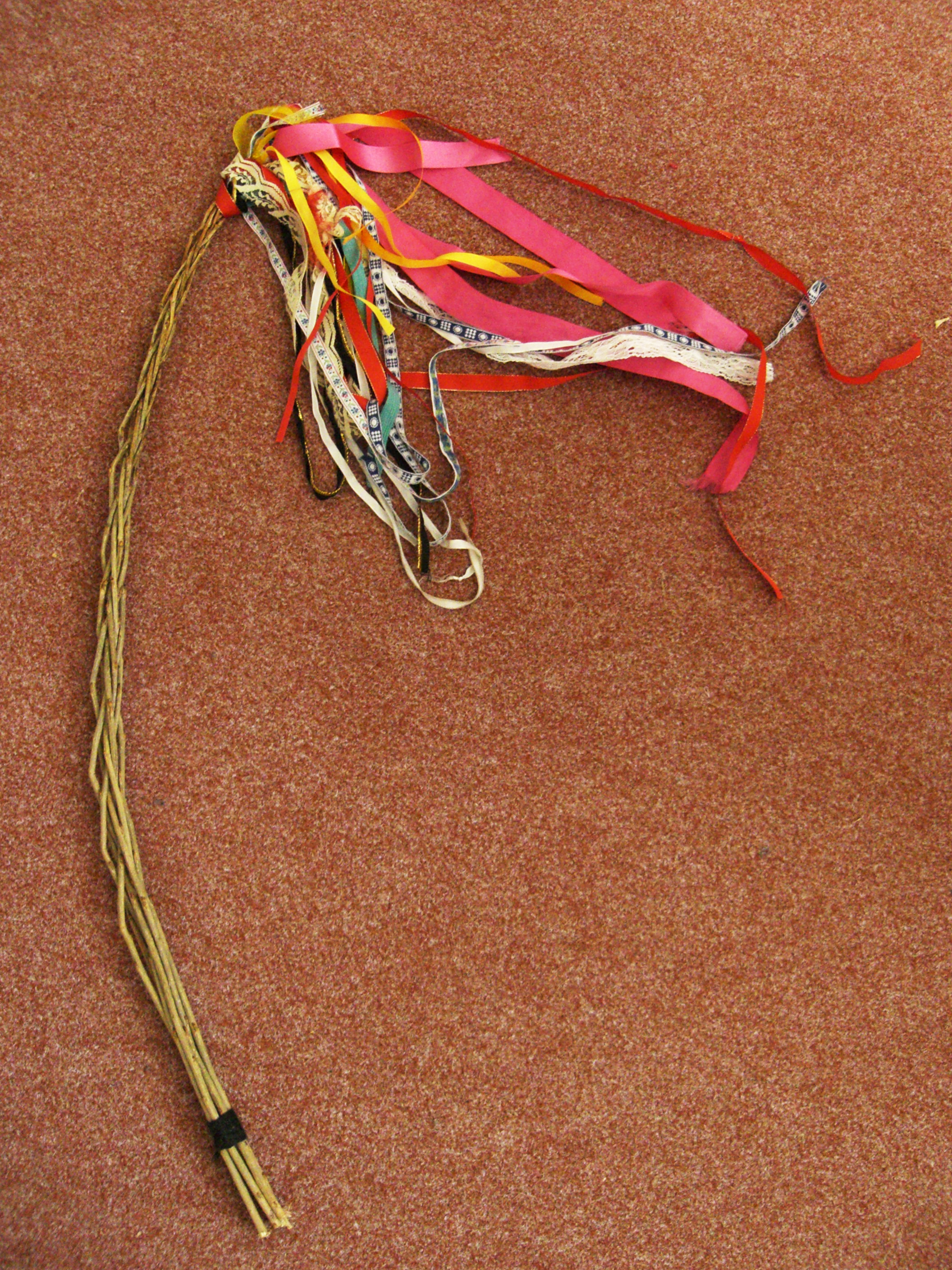
Slovak korbáč (a special handmade whip)

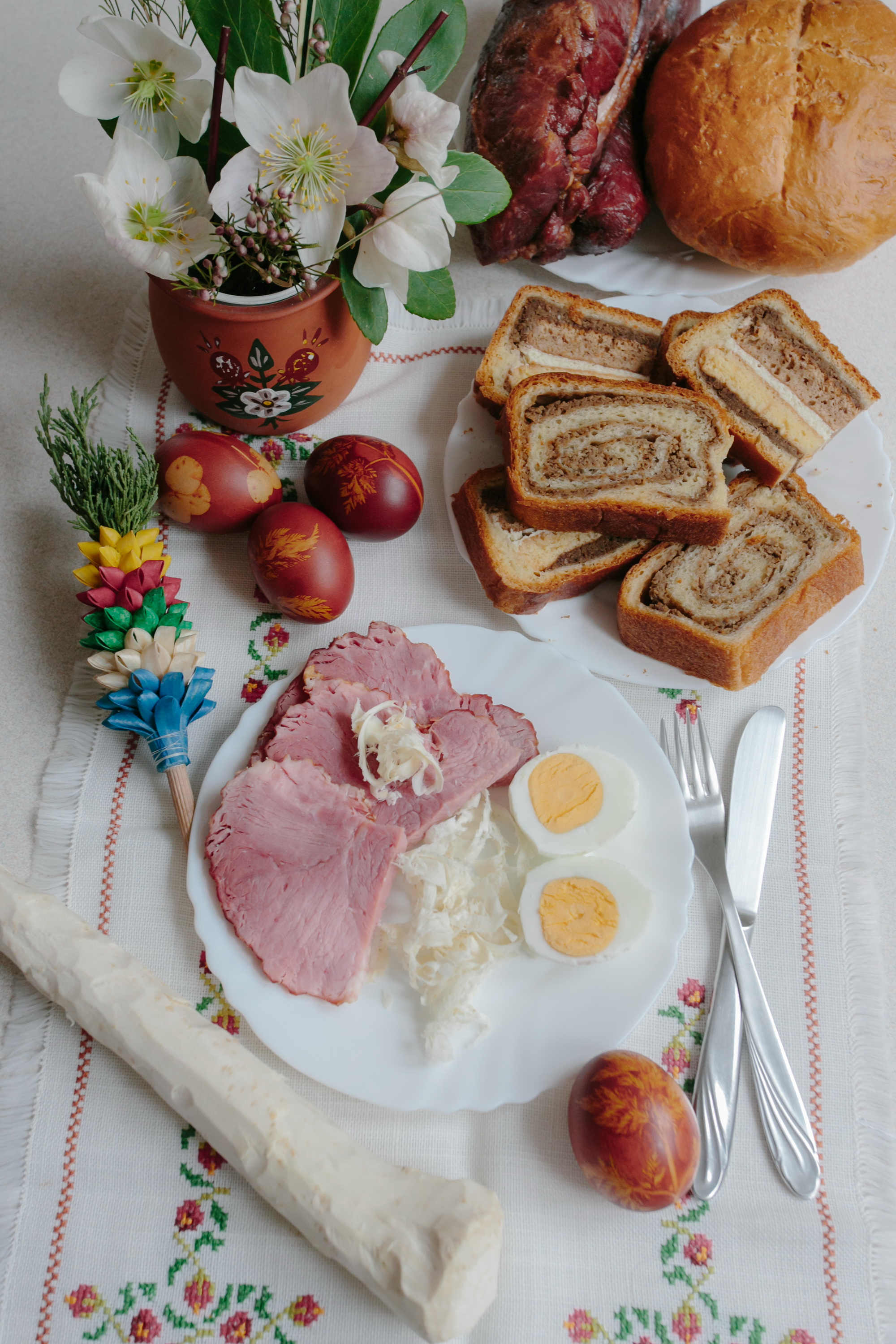
Traditional Slovenian Easter breakfast with eggs, ham with horseradish, and potica

Many central and eastern European ethnic groups, including the Albanians, Armenians, Belarusians, Bulgarians, Croats, Czechs, Estonians, Georgians, Hungarians, Latvians, Lithuanians, Macedonians, Poles, Romanians, Russians, Serbs, Slovaks, Slovenes, and Ukrainians, decorate eggs for Easter.

In Bulgaria, the Easter eggs are decorated on Thursday or Saturday before Easter. Widespread tradition is to fight with eggs by pair, and the one whose egg is the last surviving is called borak (Bulgarian: борак or борец, fighter). The tradition is to display the decorated eggs on the Easter table together with the Easter dinner consisting of roasted lamb, a salad called Easter salad (lettuce with cucumbers), and a sweet bread called kozunak.

In the Czech Republic, Slovakia, and some parts of Hungary, a tradition of spanking or whipping is carried out on Easter Monday. In the morning, men spank women with a special handmade whip called "Easter switches" called a pomlázka (in Czech) or korbáč (in Slovak); in eastern regions of former Czechoslovakia Moravia and Slovakia they also pour cold water on them. The pomlázka/korbáč consists of 8, 12 or even 24 withies (willow rods), is usually from half a metre to two meters long and decorated with coloured ribbons at the end. In some regions it might be replaced by a stick of a juniper tree. The spanking may be painful, but it's not intended to cause suffering. A legend says that women should be spanked with a whip in order to keep their health, beauty, and fertility during the whole next year.

An additional purpose may be for men to display their attraction to women; women who receive no visitors may even feel offended. Teenage girls would often brag about how many visitors they had the next day or so. Traditionally, the spanked woman gives a coloured egg (kraslice) they've prepared by themselves as invitations to eat and drink and as a sign of her thanks to the man. If the visitor is a small boy, he is usually provided with sweets and a small amount of money.

In some regions, the women can get revenge in the afternoon or the following day when they can pour a bucket of cold water on any man. The habit slightly varies across Slovakia and the Czech Republic. A similar tradition existed in Poland (where it is called Dyngus Day), but it is now little more than an all-day water fight.

In Bosnia and Herzegovina, Croatia, and Slovenia, a basket of food is prepared, covered with a handmade cloth, and brought to the church to be blessed. A typical Easter basket includes bread, colored eggs, ham, horseradish, and a type of nut cake called "potica".

In Bosnia and Herzegovina, Montenegro, Serbia and Kosovo, jumping over flames (Serbian Cyrillic: Крљавештице, romanized: Krljaveštice) is a customary requirement to jump over fire.

=== Germany ===
In northern Germany, Easter Fires (in German: Osterfeuer,) are lit around sunset on Holy Saturday. Each of the federal states have their own regulations for allowing and/or the way of staging Easter Fires: While in the city and state of Hamburg, private persons are allowed to have an Easter Fire of any size on their own premises, in Schleswig-Holstein, for example, only the widespread voluntary fire brigades are allowed to organize and stage them on open fields. Over the past years, Easter Fires themselves have become larger and developed to smaller versions of Volksfests with some snack stands selling Bratwurst, steak in bread rolls, beer, wine, and soft drinks as well as maybe one or two rides for the children. Usually, Easter Fires are kept burning over hours until dawn (roughly around 6 o'clock) and cause therefore a special atmosphere during the whole Easter Night with their bright lights in the dark and the omnipresent smell of smoke.

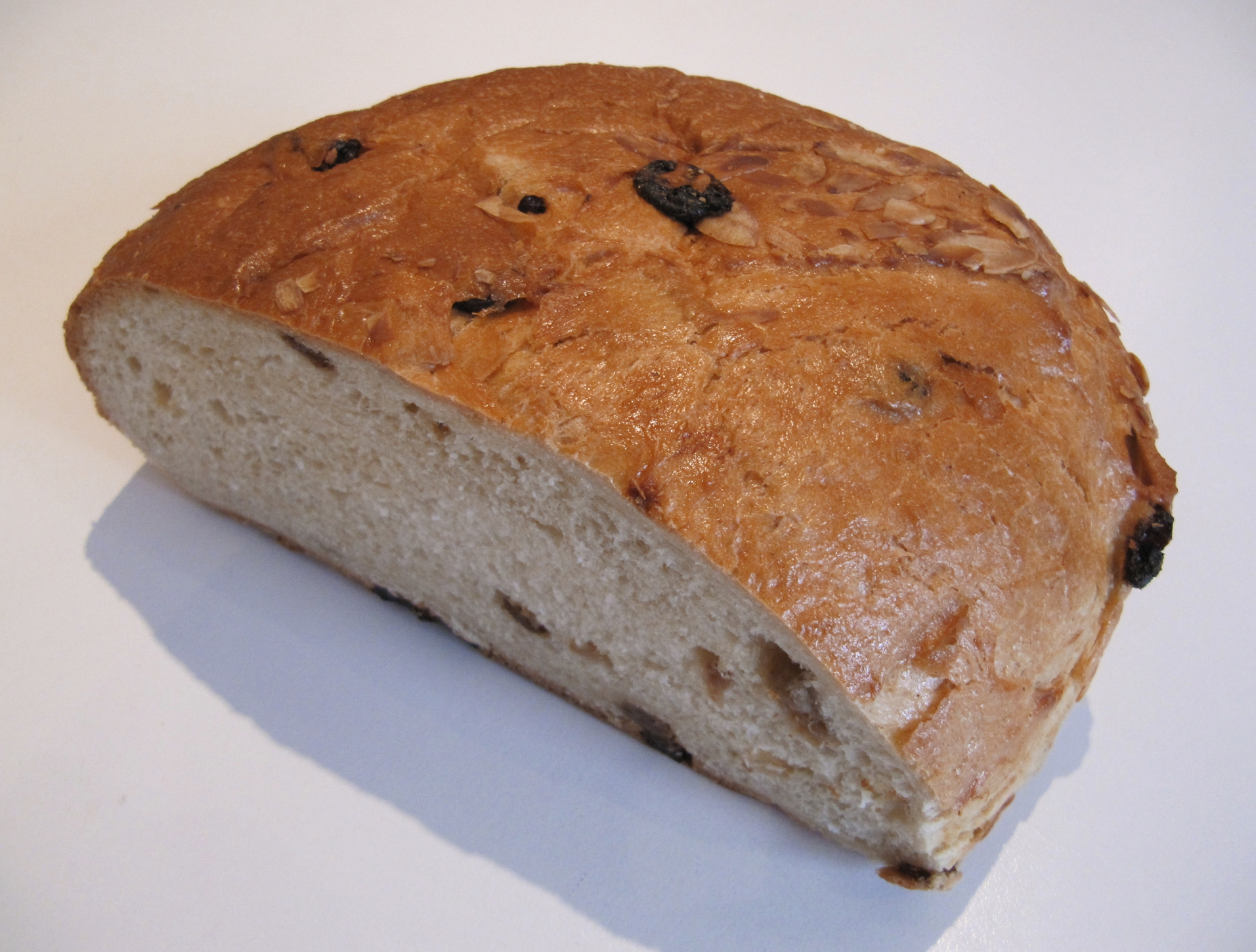
Typical German Easter bread

During the weeks before Easter, special Easter bread is sold (in German: Osterbrot). This is made with yeast dough, raisins, and almond splinters. Usually, it is cut in slices and spread with butter. People enjoy it either for breakfast or for tea time (in German: Kaffee und Kuchen, literally ″coffee and cake″).

In many parts of Germany a popular Easter pastime is egg throwing. In this "game" there are no winners or losers, nor any apparent aim. Participants throw a painted and decorated hard boiled egg as far as they can across the fields. This is repeated until eventually the egg bursts apart, an event that takes a sometimes surprising number of throws. In other versions it is a competitive event when pairs throw a raw egg to each other while moving further and further apart.

=== Hungary and neighbouring countries ===
In Hungary, Transylvania, Southern Slovakia, Kárpátalja, Northern Serbia - Vojvodina, and other territories with Hungarian-speaking communities, the day following Easter is called Locsoló Hétfő, "Watering Monday". Men usually visit families with girls and women. Water, perfume or perfumed water is sprinkled on the women and girls of the house by the visiting men, who are given in exchange an Easter egg. Traditionally Easter ham, colored boiled eggs and horseradish sauce are consumed on Sunday morning. In the Eastern part of the country, an Easter specialty known as sárgatúró (literally "yellow curd cheese") is made for the occasion.

=== Ireland ===
Easter was traditionally the most important date in the Christian calendar in Ireland, with a large feast marking the end of lent on Easter Sunday. Among the food commonly eaten were lamb, veal, and chicken, with a meal of corned beef, cabbage, and floury potatoes was a popular meal. It was traditional for farmers to share the meat from a slaughtered bullock or lamb with neighbours and or the less fortunate. Another tradition was that if a beggar called to a house, they would be given roasted potatoes. At this time of year, eggs were plentiful, and would be eaten at each meal.

Eggs were dyed for good luck, using a variety of methods such as boiling them with certain lichens and plants. The coloured eggshells would be kept to decorate the May bush. A tradition among children was to collect their own food for a feast, including eggs and potatoes, which they would cook outdoors using a fire. They would also eat buttered bread, sweet cakes, with milk of homemade cordial. The place the children's feast was held would be known as a clúdóg. As a game on Easter Sunday, it was a custom to roll hard boiled eggs down a hill. There are records of Easter Sunday being referred to as Easter Egg Day as far back as 1827, recounting the consumption of eggs.

Easter is a day of remembrance for the men and women who died in the Easter Rising which began on Easter Monday 1916. Until 1966, there was a parade of veterans, past the headquarters of the Irish Volunteers at the General Post Office (GPO) on O'Connell Street, Dublin, and a reading of the Proclamation of the Irish Republic. It is usually celebrated on Easter Monday.

=== Italy ===
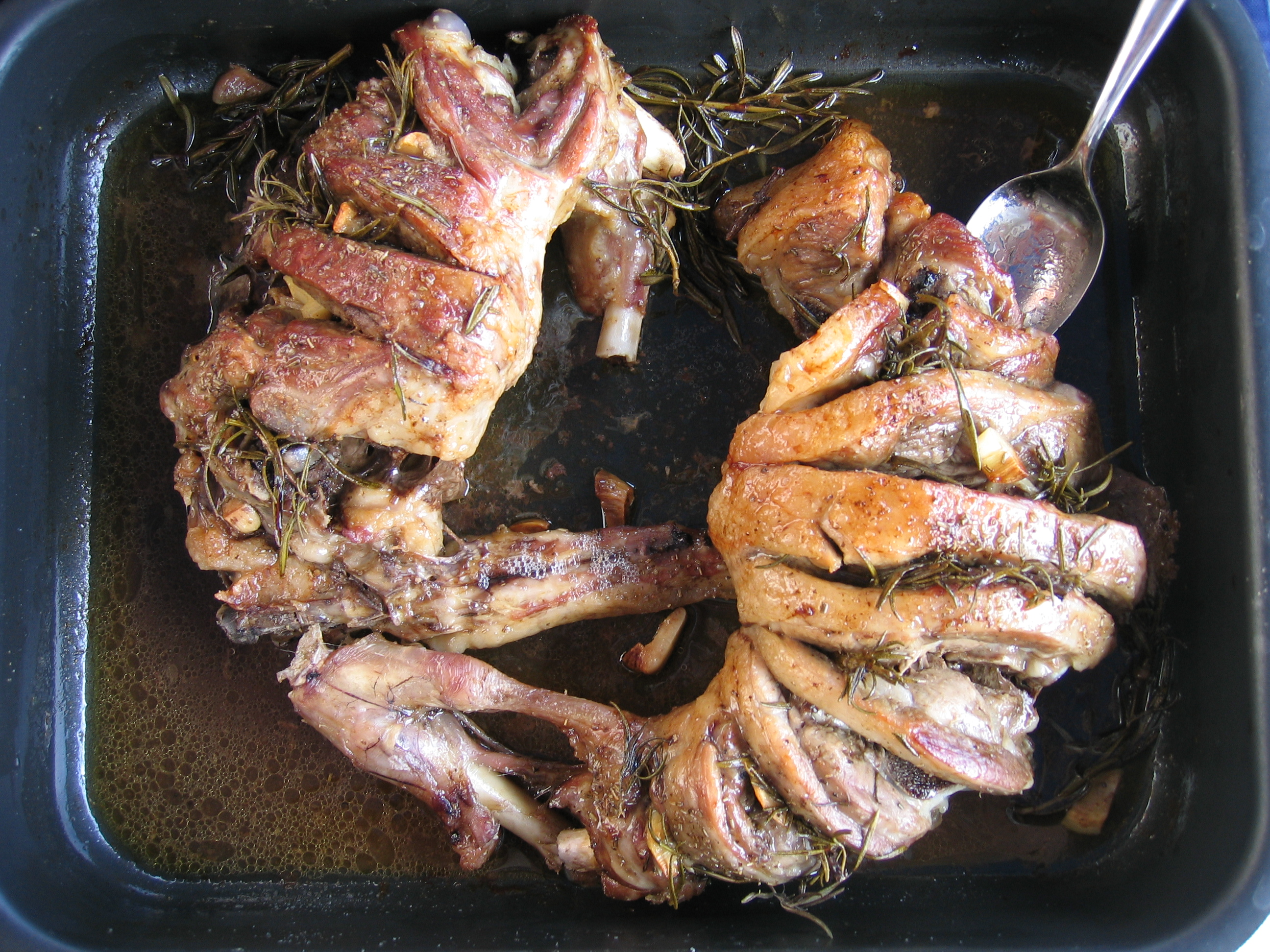
Abbacchio, an Italian preparation of lamb

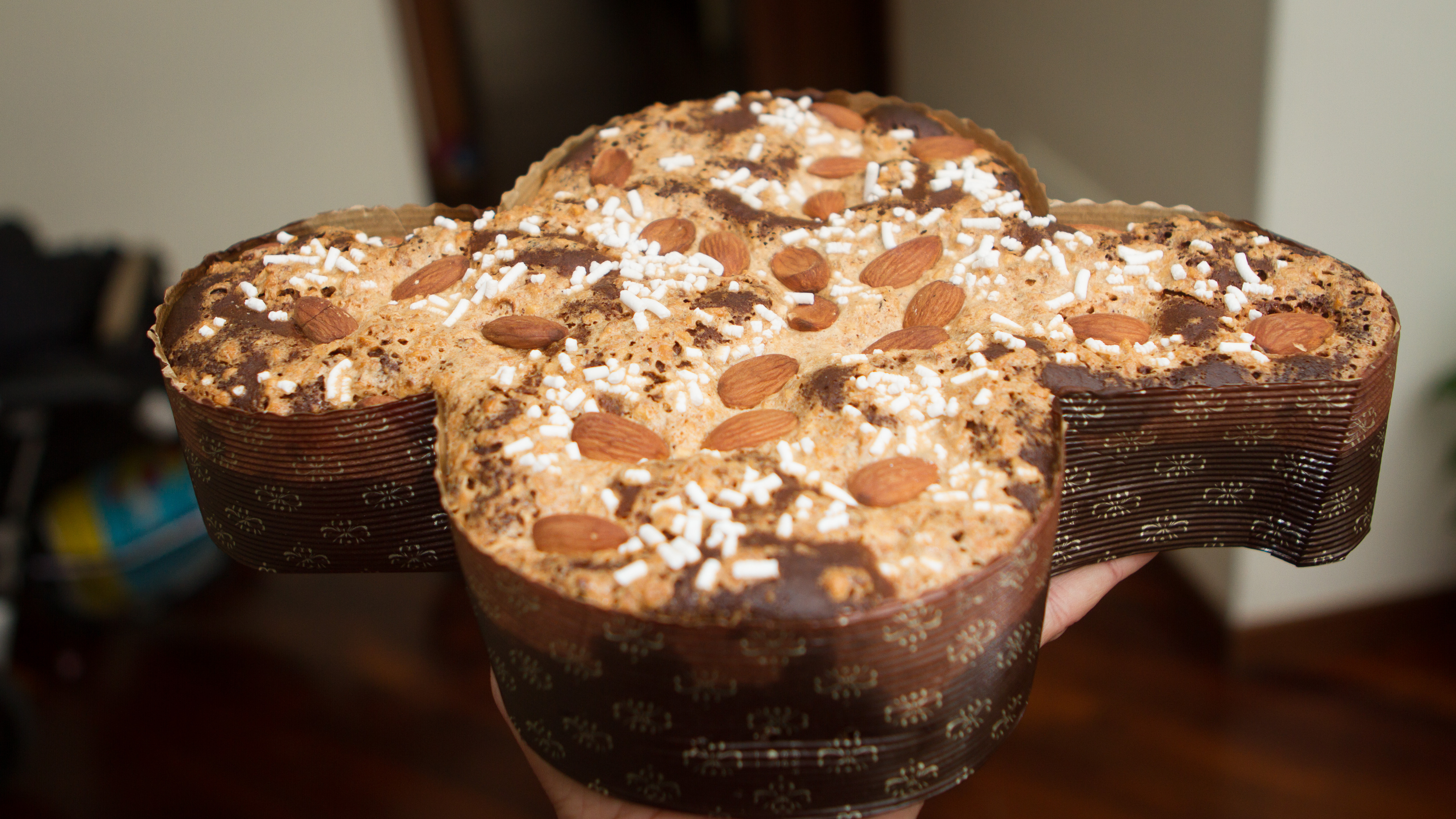
Italian Easter bread originating from Milan, the Colomba di Pasqua. It is the Easter counterpart of the two well-known Italian Christmas desserts, panettone and pandoro

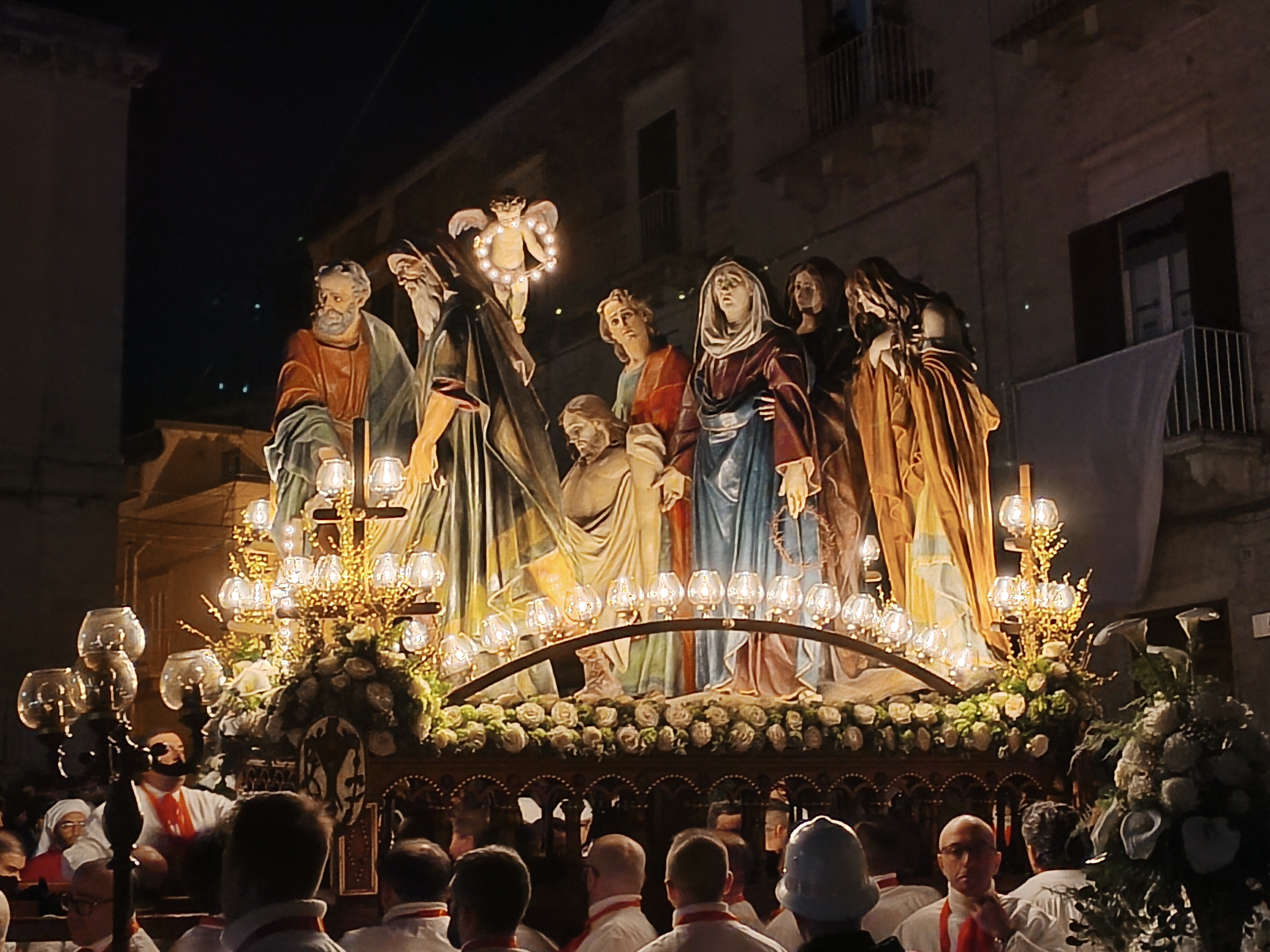
Holy Week in Ruvo di Puglia, Apulia

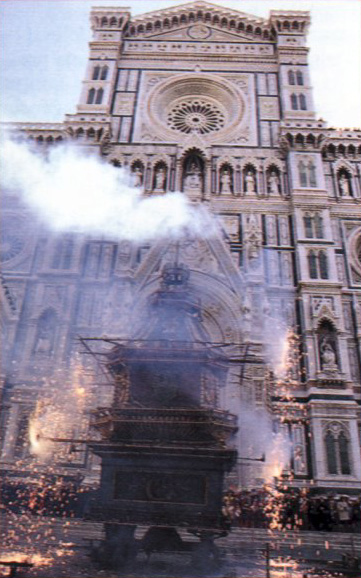
Scoppio del carro at Florence Cathedral, Tuscany, on Easter Sunday

Easter in Italy (Italian: Pasqua) is one of the country's major holidays. In Italy, there are many traditions related to Easter. The Holy Weeks worthy of note in Italy are the Processione dei Misteri di Trapani, the Holy Week in Barcellona Pozzo di Gotto and the Holy Week in Ruvo di Puglia. Traditional Italian dishes for the Easter period are abbacchio, cappello del prete, casatiello, Colomba di Pasqua, pastiera, penia, pizza di Pasqua and pizzelle. Abbacchio is an Italian preparation of lamb typical of the Roman cuisine. It is a product protected by the European Union with the PGI mark. Eating lamb at Easter has a religious meaning. The Paschal Lamb of the New Testament is in fact, for Christianity, the son of God Jesus Christ. The Paschal Lamb, in particular, represents the sacrifice of Jesus Christ for the sins of humanity. Eating lamb at Easter therefore commemorates the Death and Resurrection of Jesus. Colomba di Pasqua (English: "Easter Dove") is an Italian traditional Easter bread, the Easter counterpart of the two well-known Italian Christmas desserts, panettone and pandoro.

Abbacchio is an Italian preparation of lamb typical of the Roman cuisine. It is a product protected by the European Union with the PGI mark. In Romanesco dialect, the offspring of the sheep who is still suckling or recently weaned is called abbacchio, while the offspring of the sheep almost a year old who has already been shorn twice is called agnello ("lamb"). This distinction exists only in the Romanesco dialect. In Italy at Easter, abbacchio is cooked in different ways, with recipes that vary from region to region. In Rome it is roasted, in Apulia in the oven, in Naples it is cooked with peas and eggs, in Sardinia it is cooked in the oven with potatoes, artichokes and myrtle and in Tuscany it is cooked in cacciatore style. Other local preparations include frying and stewing. Eating lamb at Easter has a symbolic meaning. The Paschal Lamb of the New Testament is in fact, for Christianity, the son of God Jesus Christ. The Paschal Lamb, in particular, represents the sacrifice of Jesus Christ for the sins of humanity. Eating lamb at Easter therefore commemorates the Death and Resurrection of Jesus.

In Versilia, as a sign of forgiveness, but this time towards Jesus, the women of the sailors kiss the earth, saying: "Terra bacio e terra sono - Gesù mio, chiedo perdono" ("I kiss the earth and earth I am - my Jesus, I ask for forgiveness"). In Abruzzo, however, it is the custom of farmers during Easter to add holy water to food. Holy water is also used in Julian March, where half a glass is drunk on an empty stomach, before eating two hard-boiled eggs and a focaccia washed down with white wine.

Another symbol used during the Easter period is fire. In particular, in Coriano, in the province of Rimini, bonfires are lit on Easter Eve. At the same time, the blessed fire is brought to the countryside in the autonomous province of Bolzano. Bonfires are also lit in San Marco in Lamis, this time lit on a wheeled cart.

In Florence, the use of sacred fire has changed over time: before the year one thousand candles were in fact brought into the houses which were lit by a candle which was, in turn, lit through a lens or a flint; at the beginning of the 14th century, instead, three pieces of flint were used that according to tradition came from the Holy Sepulcher of Jerusalem. These pieces of flint were donated to the Pazzi family by Godfrey of Bouillon. Later, the use of the sacred fire in Florence materialized in a chariot full of fireworks (Scoppio del carro).

The Cavallo di fuoco is an historical reconstruction which takes place in the city of Ripatransone in the Province of Ascoli Piceno. It is a fireworks show, which traditionally occurs eight days after Easter. The show goes back to 1682 when, on the occasion of celebrations in honor of the Virgin Mary, the local dwellers hire a pyrotechnician who, once the spectacle was over, took all his remaining fireworks and shot riding his horse. This extemporized action struck the citizens who began to recall it yearly. In the 18th century a mock steed replaced the animal and the fireworks were assembled upon it. Originally it was made of wood, and until 1932 it was carried on the shoulders of the most robust of citizens. Later it was considered more convenient to equip it with wheels and a rudder and have it towed by volunteers equipped with protective clothing and accessories. In 1994 a new sheet iron horse, built on the model of the previous one, took the place of the wooden one.

In Italy, during Palm Sunday, palm leaves are used along with small olive branches, readily available in the Mediterranean climate. These are placed at house entrances (for instance, hanging above the door) to last until the following year's Palm Sunday. For this reason, usually palm leaves are not used whole, due to their size; instead, leaf strips are braided into smaller shapes. Small olive branches are also often used to decorate traditional Easter cakes, along with other symbols of birth, like eggs. In Italy, Easter Monday is an official public holiday and is called “Lunedì dell'Angelo” (“Monday of the Angel”), “Lunedì in Albis” or more commonly “Pasquetta”. It is customary to hold a family picnic in the countryside or barbecues with friends.

=== The Netherlands, Belgium and France ===
Church bells are silent as a sign of mourning for one or more days before Easter in The Netherlands, Belgium and France. This has led to an Easter tradition that says the bells fly out of their steeples to go to Rome (explaining their silence), and return on Easter morning bringing both colored eggs and hollow chocolate shaped like eggs or rabbits.

In both The Netherlands and Dutch-speaking Belgium, many more modern traditions exist alongside the Easter Bell story. The bells ("de Paasklokken") leave for Rome on Holy Saturday, called "Stille Zaterdag" (literally "Silent Saturday") in Dutch. In the northern and eastern parts of the Netherlands (Twente and Achterhoek), Easter Fires (in Dutch: Paasvuur) are lit at sunset on Easter Day.

In French-speaking Belgium and France the same story of Easter Bells ("les cloches de Pâques") bringing eggs from Rome is told, but church bells are silent beginning Maundy Thursday, the beginning of the Paschal Triduum.

=== Nordic countries ===
In Norway, in addition to staying at mountain cabins, cross-country skiing and painting eggs, a contemporary tradition is to read or watch murder mysteries at Easter. All the major television channels run crime and detective stories (such as Agatha Christie's Poirot), magazines print stories where the readers can try to figure out "Whodunnit", and new detective novels are scheduled for publishing before Easter. Even the milk cartons are altered for a couple of weeks. Each Easter a new short mystery story is printed on their sides. Stores and businesses close for five straight days at Easter, with the exception of grocery stores, which re-open for a single day on the Saturday before Easter Sunday.

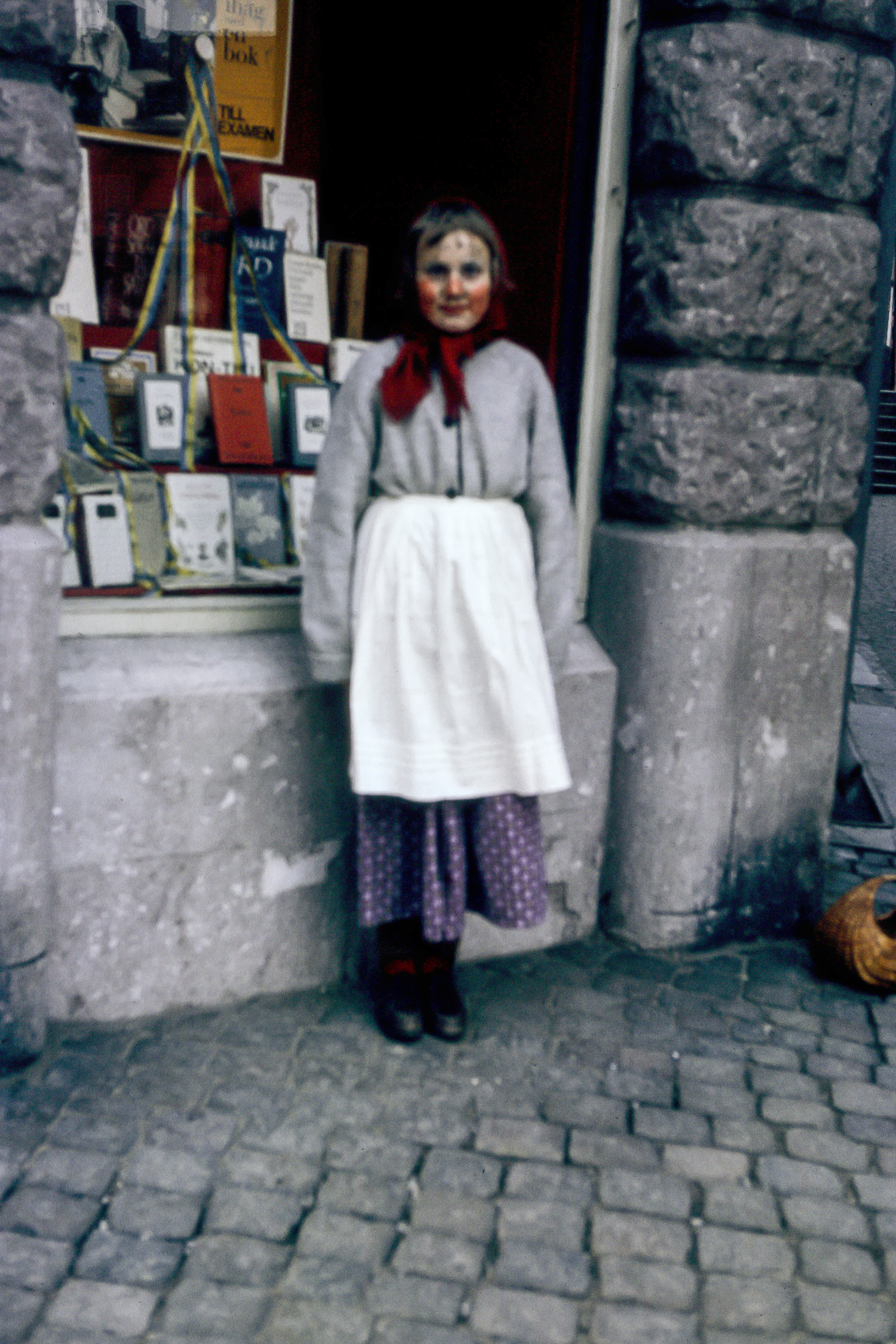
A girl dressed up as an Easter witch

In Sweden and Finland, traditions include egg painting and small children dressed as Easter witches (påskkärring or in Finland påskhäxa, typically dressed as old folks) collecting candy door-to-door, in exchange for decorated hand-made greetings such as cards or pussy willows, called virvonta in Finland, which is a result of the mixing of an old Orthodox tradition (blessing houses with willow branches) and the Swedish Easter witch tradition. Brightly coloured feathers and little decorations are also attached to birch branches in a vase. In Finland, it is common to plant ryegrass in a pot as a symbol of spring and new life. After the grass has grown, many people put chick decorations on it. Children busy themselves painting eggs and making paper bunnies.

Denmark has the gækkebrev tradition of sending relatives and friends artful paper cuttings, often with a snowdrop, and a rhyme with the letters of the sender's name replaced by dots. If the recipient guesses who sent it, the sender owes them a chocolate egg; and vice versa if they can't. The decorated letter custom was originally a means of proposal or courtship, but is now considered mostly for children.

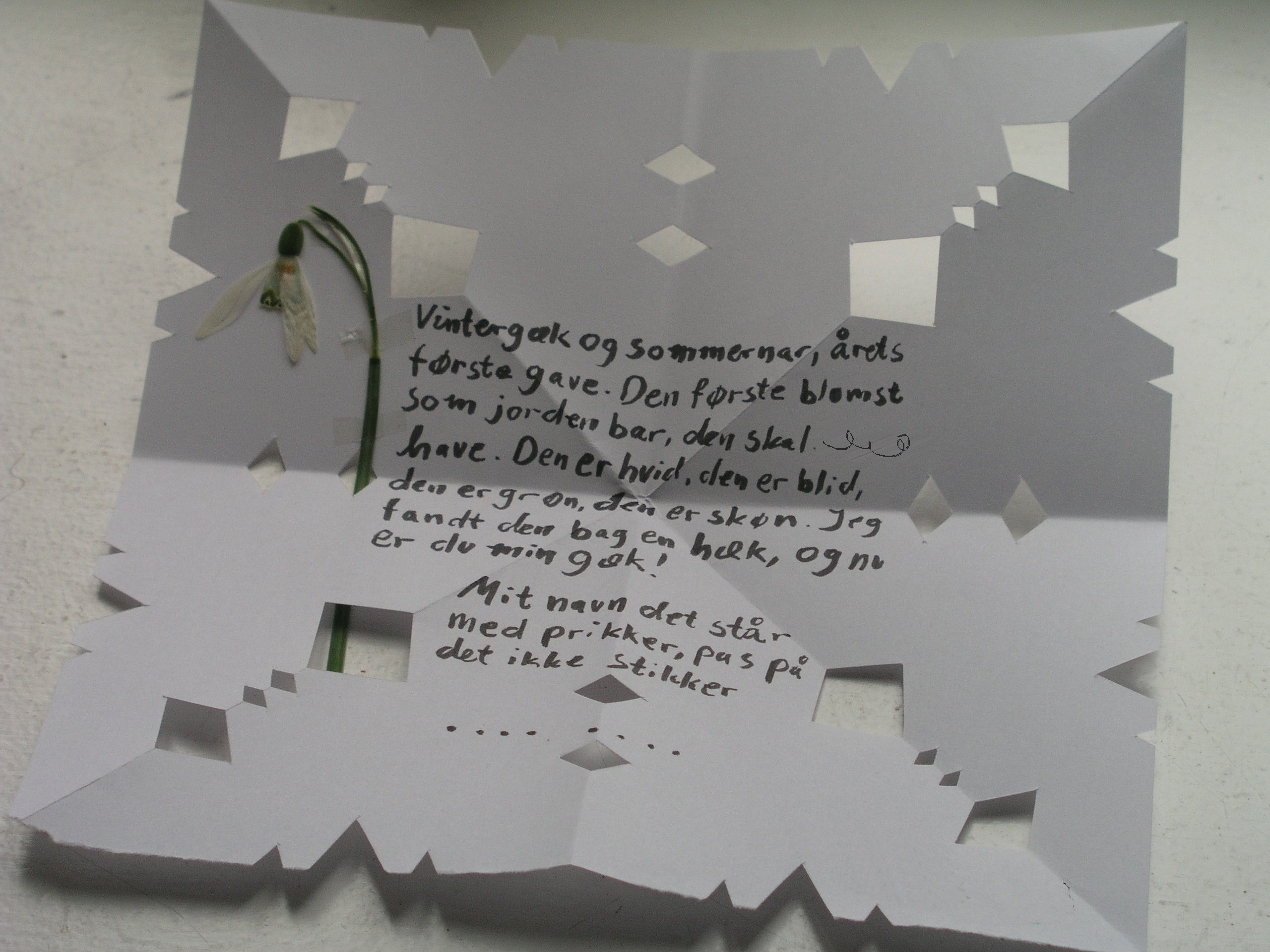
Gækkebrev, a Danish Easter letter

For lunch or dinner on Holy Saturday, families in Sweden and Denmark traditionally feast on a smörgåsbord of herring, salmon, potatoes, eggs, and other kinds of food. In Finland, it is common to eat roasted lamb with potatoes and other vegetables. In Finland, the Lutheran majority enjoys mämmi as another traditional Easter treat, while the Orthodox minority's traditions include eating pasha (also spelled paskha) instead.

In the western parts of Sweden and in Finnish Ostrobothnia, bonfires have at least since the 18th century been lit during Holy Saturday. This tradition is claimed to have its origin in Holland. During the last decades though, the bonfires have in many places been moved to Walpurgis Night, as this is the traditional date for bonfires in many other parts of the country.

=== Poland ===
In Poland, white sausage and mazurek are typical Easter breakfast dishes.

The butter lamb (Baranek wielkanocny) is a traditional addition to the Easter meal for many Polish Catholics. Butter is shaped into a lamb either by hand or in a lamb-shaped mold.

=== Ukraine ===
Preparations for Easter celebration in Ukraine begin weeks before the feast day, with Great Lent being part of it. The Ukrainian Easter eggs include pysanky, krashanky (edible, one-colour dyed eggs), driapanky (a design is scratched on the eggshell) etc. During the Easter Vigil a priest also blesses the parishioners' Easter baskets, which include Easter eggs, paska, butter, cheese, kovbasa, salt and a few other products. With this food, on their return home, people break their fast. The ritual is called 'rozhovyny'. People visit their relatives and neighbours exchanging Easter greetings. Celebration of Easter in Ukraine is filled with many other customs and rituals, most of which are centuries-old.

=== United Kingdom ===
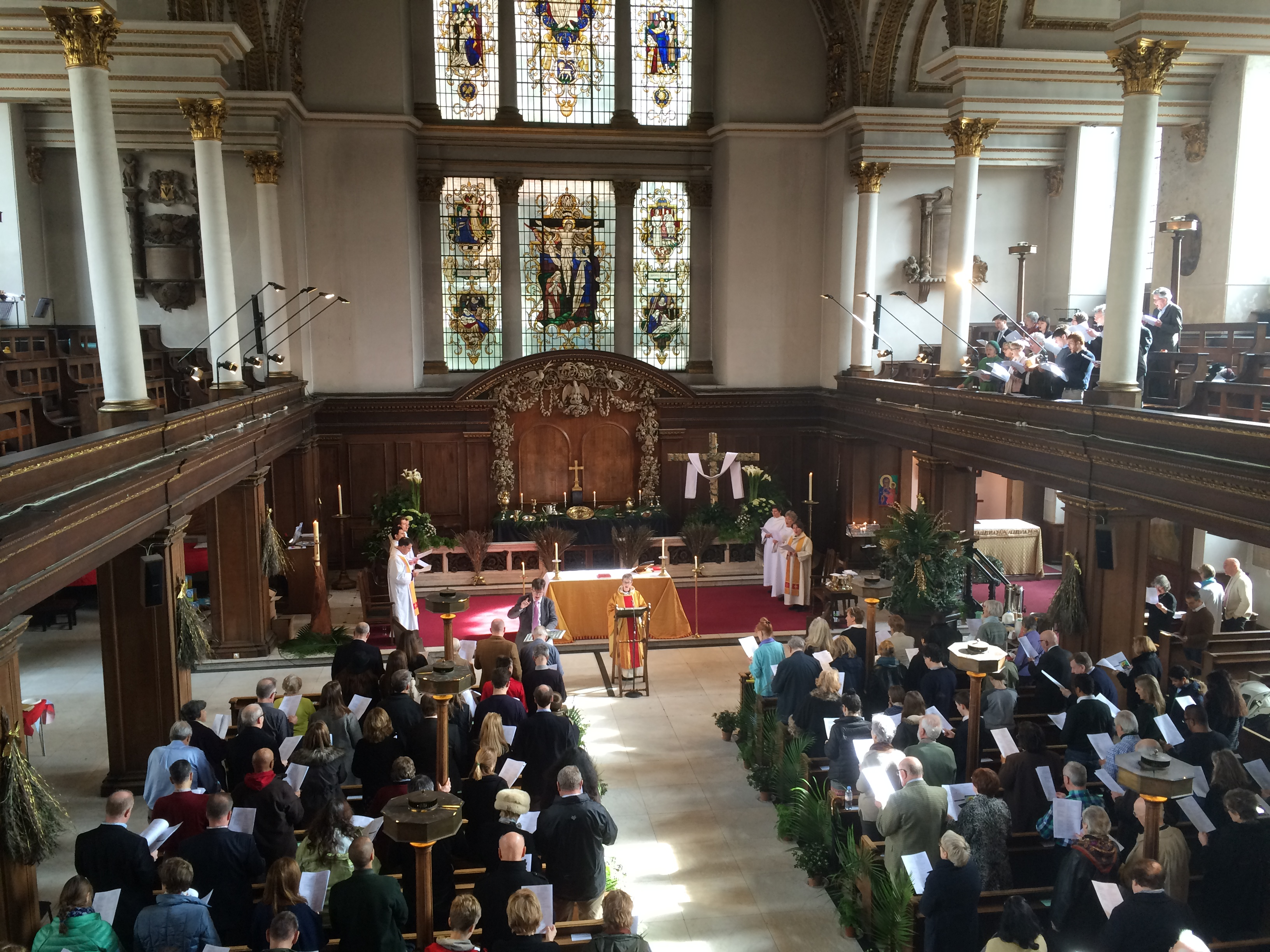
Christian worshippers attend an Easter Sunday church service at St James's Church in London; the cross in the chancel is draped with a white shroud, symbolizing the resurrection

In Scotland, the north of England, and Northern Ireland, the traditions of rolling decorated eggs down steep hills and pace egging are still adhered to.

Strutt and Hone in their 1867 book The Sports and Pastimes of the People of England describe an Easter tradition from the Isles of Scilly called goose dancing. For goose dancing the maidens dress up as young men and vice versa. In this disguise they visit neighbours for dancing and making joke stories.

== Oceania ==
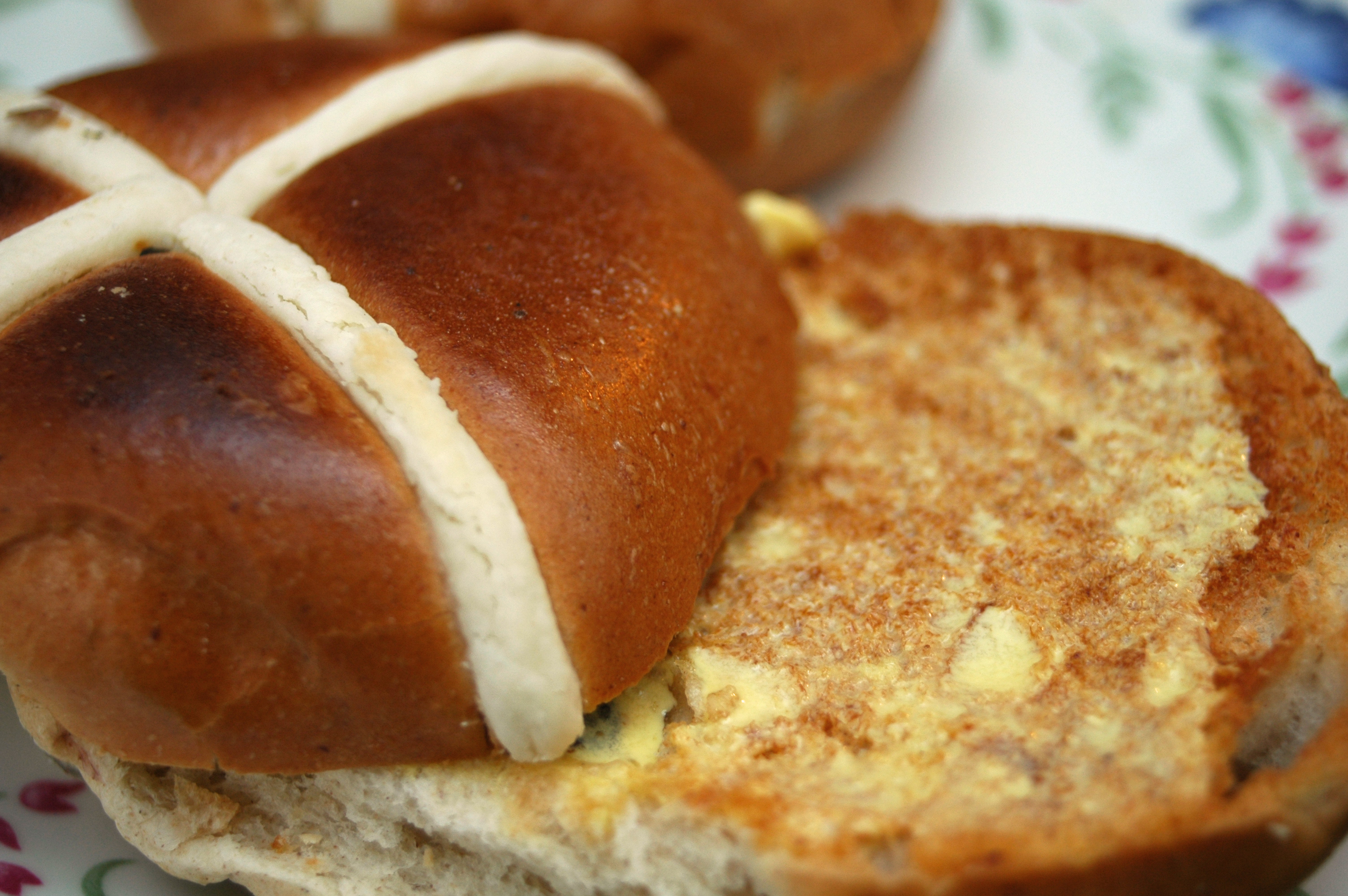
Hot cross buns

=== Australia ===
In Australia, Easter is celebrated with hot cross buns and Easter Bilbys. The Sydney Royal Easter Show is also an annual tradition.

=== New Zealand ===
In New Zealand, Easter is celebrated with hot cross buns and chocolate eggs. The Auckland Easter Show is also an annual tradition.

== See also ==
- Easter Bilby
- Easter egg
- Easter foods
- Egg decorating in Slavic culture
- Ēostre
- Paschal greeting
