= Egg rolling =

Traditional Easter game

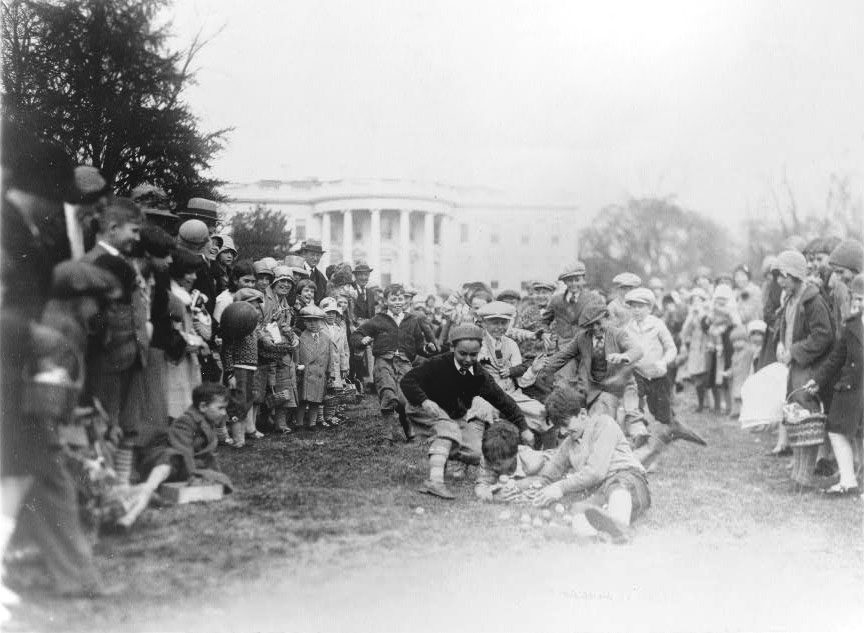
The egg roll on the South Lawn of the White House in 1929

Egg rolling, or an Easter egg roll, is a traditional game played with eggs at Easter. Different nations have different versions of the game, usually played with hard-boiled, decorated eggs.

== Rules ==
Rules vary by location. In general, players roll eggs on the ground, and the object is to roll one's egg farthest or fastest. Variations include games in which the object is for the rolled egg to either touch or crack other eggs.

== History ==
In Christianity, for the celebration of Eastertide, Easter eggs symbolize the empty tomb of Jesus, from which he was resurrected. Additionally, eggs carry a Trinitarian significance, with shell, yolk, and albumen being three parts of one egg. During Lent, the season of repentance that precedes Easter, eggs along with meat, dairy foods, and wine are traditionally abstained from, a practice that continues in Eastern Christianity and among certain Western Christian congregations that do the Daniel Fast.

After the forty-day Lenten season concludes and Eastertide begins, eggs may be consumed again, giving rise to traditions such as egg rolling, which also symbolizes the angel rolling away the stone at the entrance of the tomb.

== United Kingdom ==
In the United Kingdom the tradition of rolling decorated eggs down grassy hills goes back hundreds of years and is known as "pace-egging". The term originates from the Old English Pasch, taken from the Hebrew Pesach meaning Passover. In Lancashire there are annual egg rolling competitions at Holcombe Hill near Ramsbottom and Avenham Park in Preston. Egg rolling has been a tradition at Avenham Park for hundreds of years, but in recent years chocolate eggs have been used. Other traditional egg rolling sites are the castle moat at Penrith, Bunkers Hill in Derby, Arthur's Seat in Edinburgh, Hill 60 on the Beverley Westwood and on Penshaw Hill in Tyne and Wear at Penshaw Monument.

Traditionally, the eggs were wrapped in onion skins and boiled to give them a mottled, gold appearance (although today they usually are painted), and the children competed to see who could roll their egg the farthest. There is an old Lancashire legend that says the broken eggshells should be crushed carefully afterward, or these would be stolen and used as boats by witches. The eggs were eaten on Easter Sunday or given out to pace-eggers – fantastically dressed characters who processed through the streets singing traditional pace-egging songs and collecting money as a tribute before performing traditional mumming plays. At the Wordsworth Museum in Grasmere, there is a collection of highly decorated eggs made for the poet's children.

In Scotland, pace-eggin is traditional from Shetland to The Borders although the day varied with location. Pace-egg day variously was Holy Saturday, Easter Sunday, or Easter Monday. Paiss-braes, hills, were used or other grassy slopes or areas such as seaside links. There is some variation in the spelling and pronunciation of the term pace, including pash, peace and paste.

== United States ==
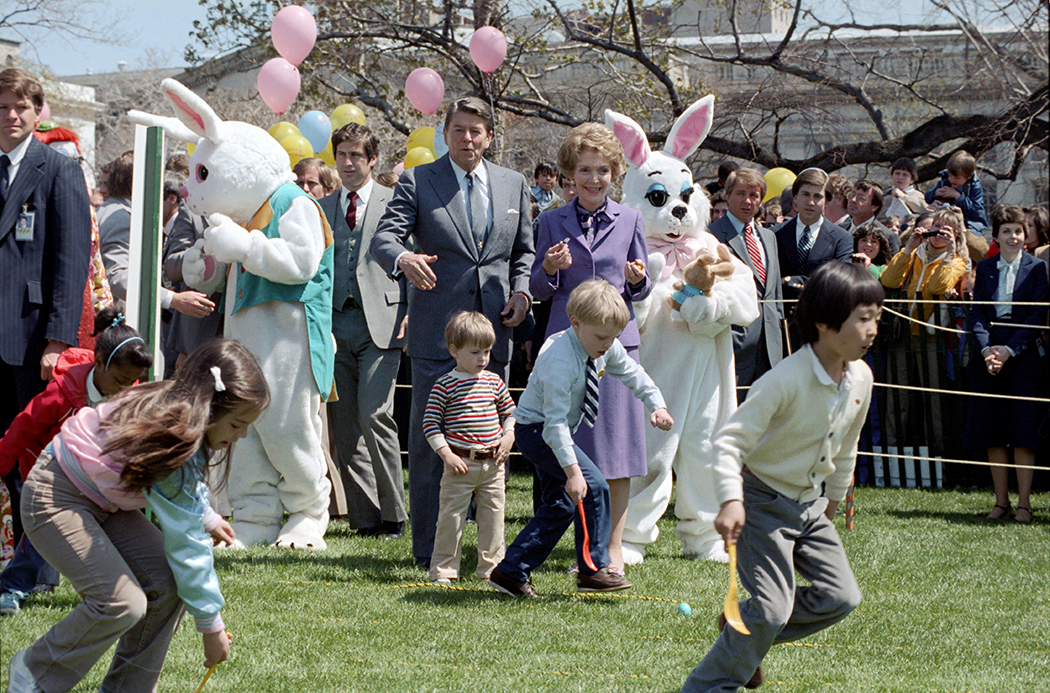
The Reagans at the 1982 White House Easter egg roll

In the United States, the Easter Egg Roll is held on the White House South Lawn each Easter Monday for children, age 13 and younger, and their parents. It is hosted by the president of the United States and the first lady of the United States.

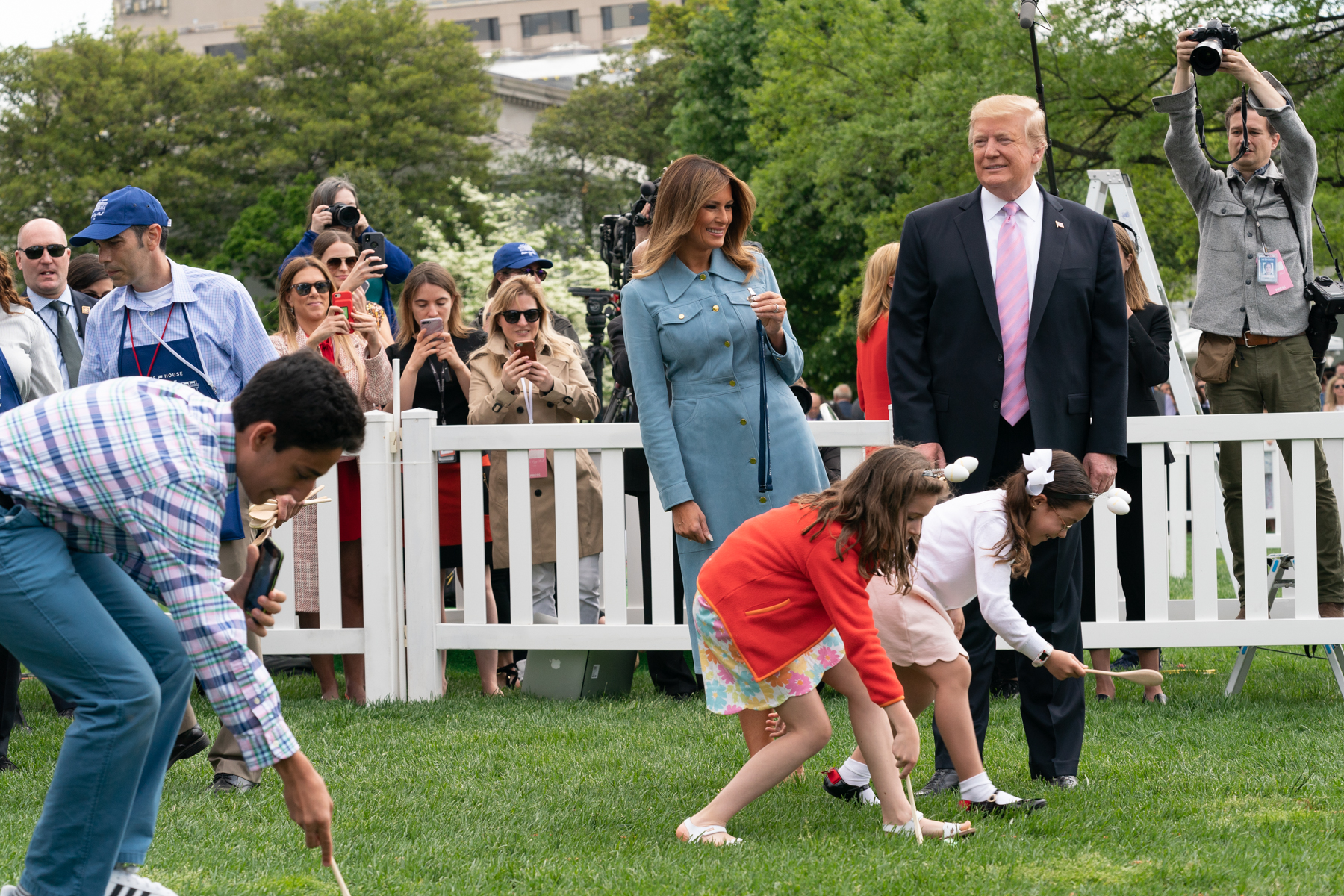
The Trumps at the 2019 White House Easter egg roll

The Egg Roll is a race where children push an egg through the grass with a long-handled spoon. Surrounding events include live entertainment, appearances by White House personalities in Easter Bunny costumes, speeches and book-reading by cabinet secretaries or celebrity guests, and exhibits of artistically decorated eggs. The event traditionally begins with a performance of the national anthem, followed by opening remarks by the President and the First Lady. Since 2017, the national anthem cannot be sung by a notable recording artist.

A legend claims that Dolley Madison, the wife of President James Madison, began the event in 1814. Rolling Easter eggs was a popular annual custom in Washington, D.C., and Alexandria, Virginia, as early as the 1850s. Children rolled eggs on Easter Monday (and sometimes Good Friday) at the Capitol, the White House, and other parks and open spaces. Easter eggs were rolled at the Capitol as early as 1855 and at the White House as early as 1860. By the 1870s, the Capitol had become the most popular place to roll eggs, although they were also rolled at the White House and other places.

In 1876, shortly after a particularly rambunctious Easter egg roll destroyed much of the lawn at the Capitol, Congress passed a law making it illegal to use the Capitol complex as a children's playground. Heavy rain prevented much egg rolling in 1877, so the ban was not tested until 1878.

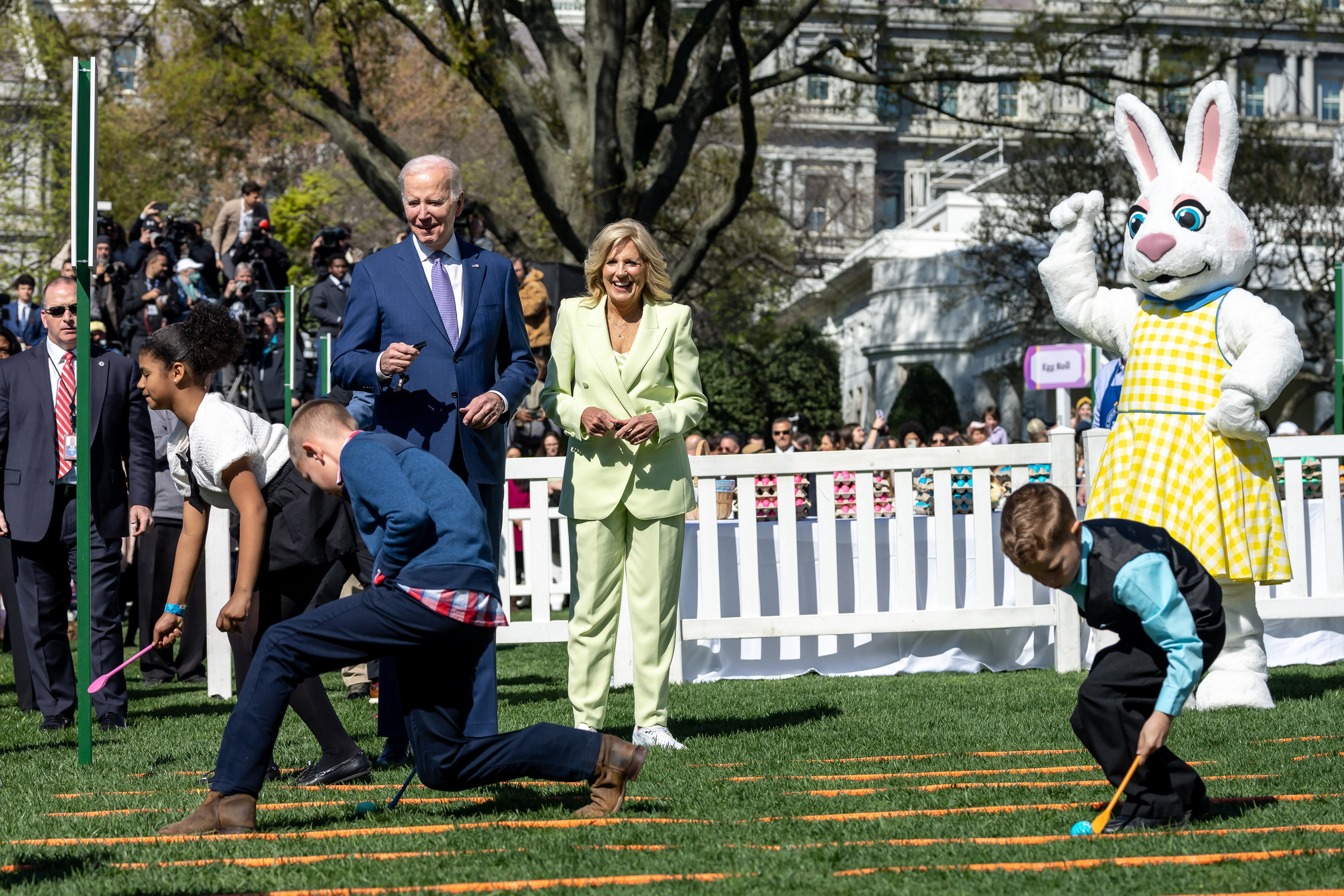
The Bidens at the 2023 White House Easter egg roll

At the request of a number of children, including his own, then president Rutherford B. Hayes and first lady Lucy Hayes brought the event to the White House lawns in 1878. From 1878 on, the egg roll was an annual White House event, with the exception of 1917 (moved to the Washington Monument), 1918–1920 (canceled due to food shortages and influenza concerns), 1942 (moved to the Capitol West Lawn), 1943–1945 (World War II), 1946–1947 (food conservation), 1948–1952 (restoration of the White House) and 2020–2021 (social distancing measures to mitigate the COVID-19 pandemic), then resumed in 2022.

In 1953, Mamie Eisenhower proposed that the event be opened to black children, who were allowed to participate starting in 1954. Since 1977, the American Egg Board has heavily supported the event.

The event was featured in the 2007 film National Treasure: Book of Secrets.

In 2025, the Trump administration announced that companies could sponsor the event with a $200,000 contribution. Big tech companies including Amazon and Meta helped sponsor the event.

== Other countries ==
In Germany, a prize is awarded to the contestant whose egg rolls the fastest down a track made of sticks. In Denmark, decorated eggs are rolled down slopes in grassland or forest, and the contestant whose egg rolls farthest is the winner, with unbroken eggs eaten after the game. The tradition is widespread around the town of Køge. In Lithuania, one collects those eggs touched by the one rolled.

In Egypt, children bowl red and yellow eggs toward another row of eggs, and whoever's egg cracks one egg may claim them all.

In eastern Europe, there are other traditions such as egg tapping and egg decorating.

== See also ==
- Egg dance
- Egg hunt
- Egg tapping
- Egg tossing
