= Koni-juj =

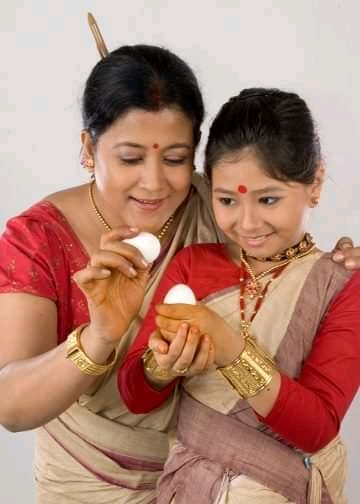

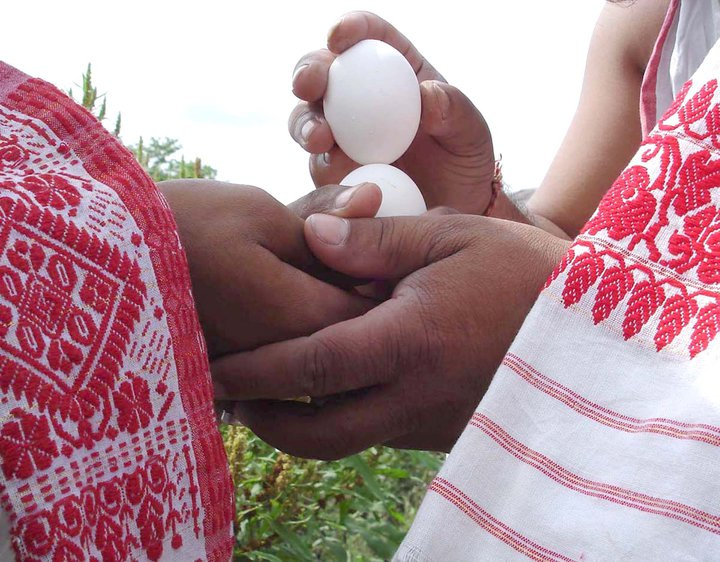

Koni-juj (Assamese: কণীযুঁজ) or Egg tapping or Egg fight is a festive game, played in Assam in India.

== Terminology ==
- Occasion: Koni-juj is played on the day of Garu Bihu of Rongali Bihu, in mid-April, after washing cattle people enjoy play various games along with koni-juj; and on the day of Bhogali Bihu, in mid-January, after the burning of the meji.
- Rules: The game is played by two people, one holding an egg vertically another tapping from top. The one whose egg breaks loses and the winner takes the broken egg as prize.
- How to choose a gaming egg: Players test the gaming egg from many eggs by knocking them with a coin and checking the sound, or by holding the egg against sunlight to check for the thickness of the shell.
- Origin: Assamese people generally depend on agriculture: the two Bihus fall before sowing (mid-April) and after harvesting (mid-January). Koni-juj on Bihu thus associated with the fertility of the land.
- Literature evidence: Many writers have written about this game. Assamese writer Hem Borgohain wrote descriptively about this game on his book Bihu Akou Aahil. Royals were very fond of this game just as the general citizens were. This game used to be played on Rongali and Bhogali Bihu along with kori khel, buffalo fight, elephant fight, archery, fencing etc.

== See also ==
- Culture of Assam
- Bihu
- Haat Bihu
