= Egg hunt =

Easter game

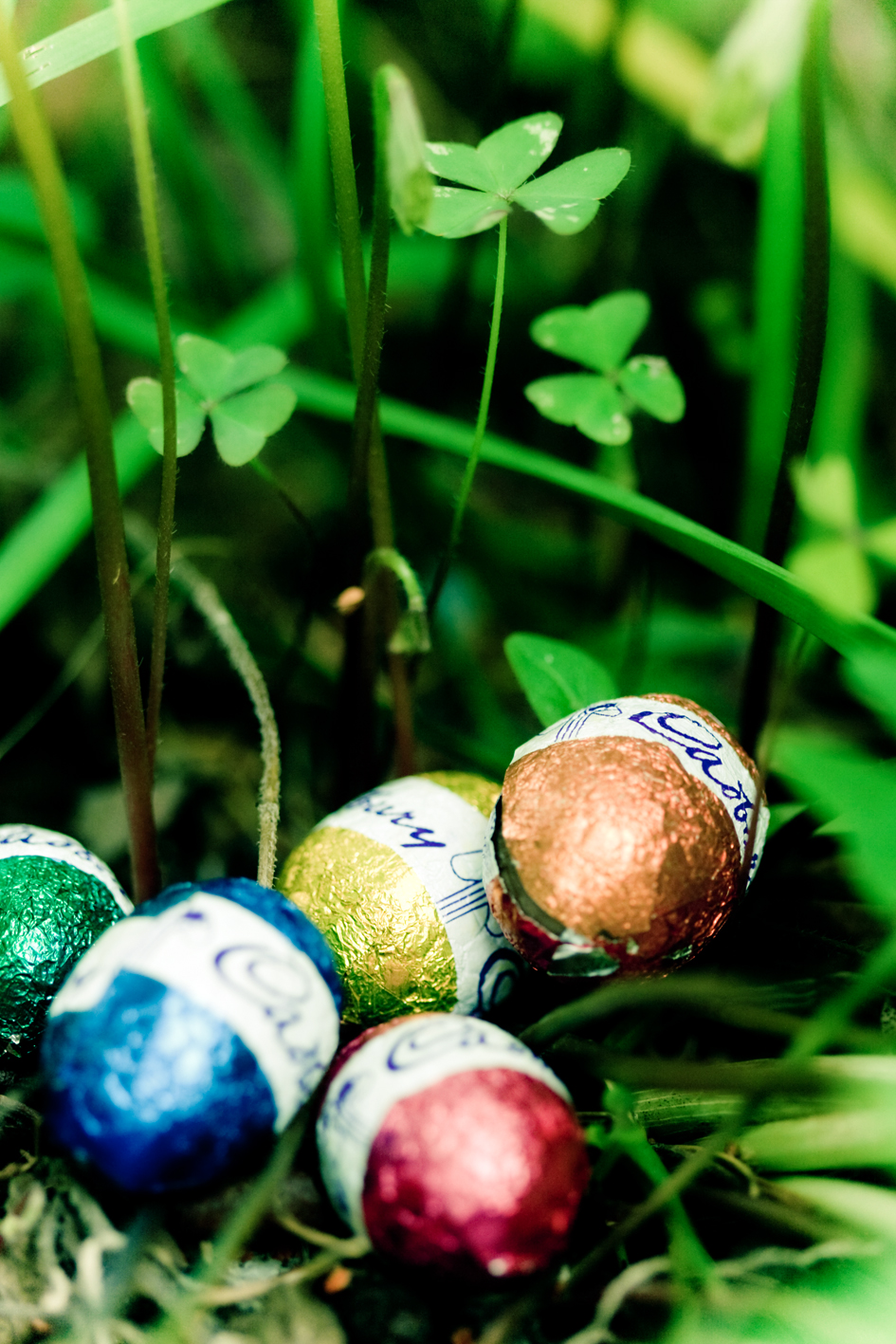
Chocolate Cadbury Easter eggs hidden as part of an egg hunt

An egg hunt is a treasure hunt played at Easter during which children look for hidden decorated eggs or Easter eggs. Real hard-boiled eggs, which are typically dyed or painted, artificial eggs made of plastic filled with chocolate or candies, or foil-wrapped egg-shaped chocolates of various sizes are hidden in various places. The food items found may be consumed with the end of the Lenten sacrifice during the preceding forty days of Lent.

The game is often played outdoors, but is also played indoors. The children typically collect the eggs in a basket. When the hunt is over, prizes may be given out for various achievements, such as the largest number of eggs collected, for the largest or smallest egg, for the most eggs of a specific color, consolation prizes or booby prizes. Real eggs may further be used in egg tapping contests. If eggs filled with confetti left from Mardi Gras (cascarones) are used, then an egg fight may follow. Eggs are placed with varying degree of concealment, to accommodate children of varying ages and development levels. In South German folk traditions, it was customary to add extra obstacles to the game by placing them into hard-to reach places among nettles or thorns.

== History ==
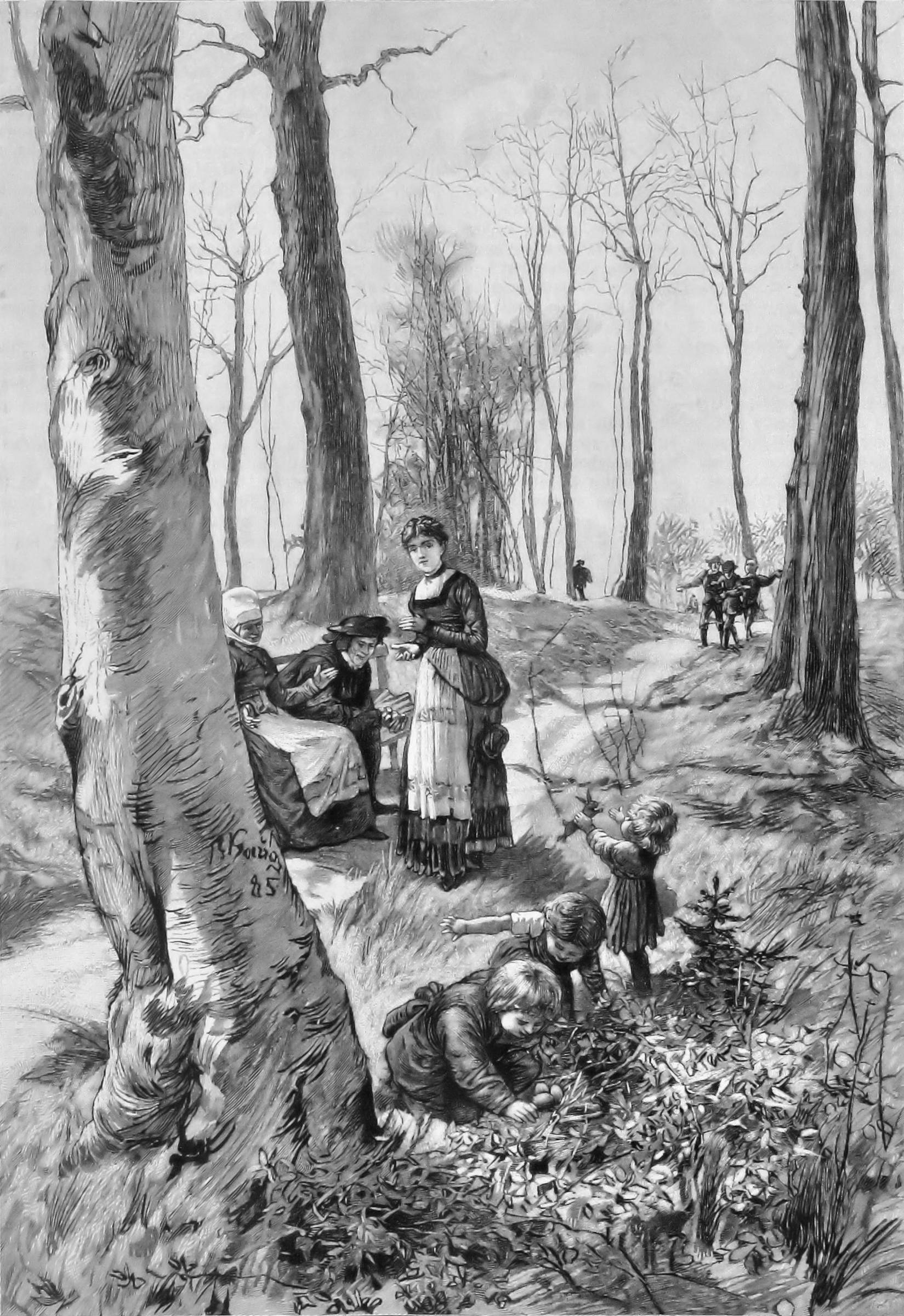
Ostertag (Easter Day) by Robert von Haug showing children looking for eggs and bunnies

The egg was a symbol of the rebirth of the earth in pre-Christian celebrations of spring. However, the Easter egg itself was defined by early Christians as an Easter symbol of the resurrection of Jesus: the egg symbol was likened to the tomb from which Christ arose. Hen's egg has played a role in Easter since the 4th century, and the tradition of decorated eggs may have arisen in Orthodox Christianity where eggs were stained red to signify the blood spilt by Christ. The exchange of decorated eggs is known in many European countries such as Russia, and in England gifting of such eggs is known since the Middle Ages. The specific custom of the Easter egg hunt may have its origin in Germany. Some believed the Protestant Christian Reformer Martin Luther was the first to organize Easter egg hunts in the 16th century, when he suggested that men hide eggs in the garden for their wives and children to find. The hunt for Easter eggs in the garden, representing the garden of Christ's tomb, symbolized searching the empty tomb and the risen Jesus.

The association of the Easter Bunny with Easter eggs has been known since at least the 17th century. The German physician and botanist Georg Franck von Franckenau wrote in 1682 the folk belief of der Oster-Hase (Easter bunny) that laid Hasen-Eier (hare's-eggs) hidden in gardens, grass and bushes, and children then searched for these hidden eggs in egg hunts. The tradition of Easter bunny and colored eggs was introduced into North America by migrants from southwest Germany in the 18th century.

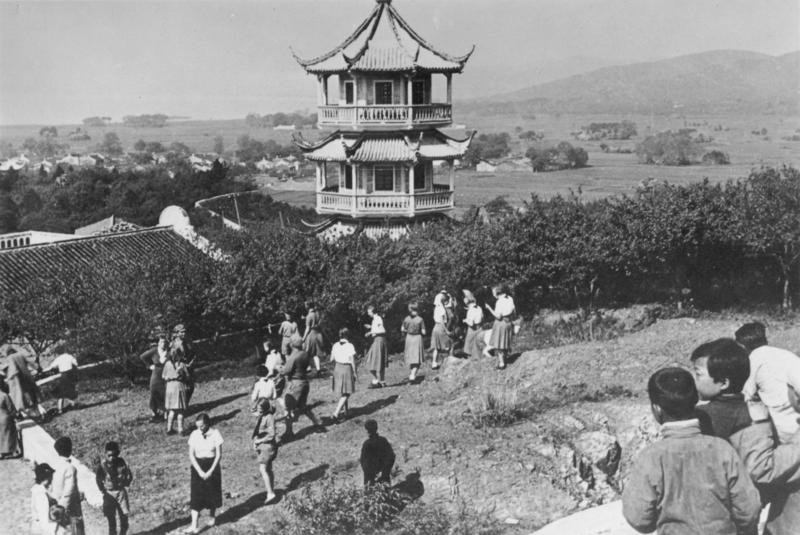
Easter egg hunt in Wuxi, Jiangsu (1934)

The tradition of egg hunt was also introduced into the British royal household from Germany. When she was 14, Queen Victoria wrote about an egg hunt organised by her mother Duchess of Kent, who was born in Germany. Queen Victoria and her husband Prince Albert also organised egg hunts for their children. The eggs of the early period were likely hard-boiled and decorated, but artificial eggs also appeared in London in the 1850s. The first chocolate eggs were made in France and Germany in the early 19th century, and in England chocolate Easter eggs were produced by Frys in 1873. The German origin of egg hunt was still noted in the late 19th century, A. E. Housman in his inaugural lecture as Professor of Latin at University College, London in 1892 said, "In Germany at Easter time they hide coloured eggs about the house and garden that the children may amuse themselves in discovering them."

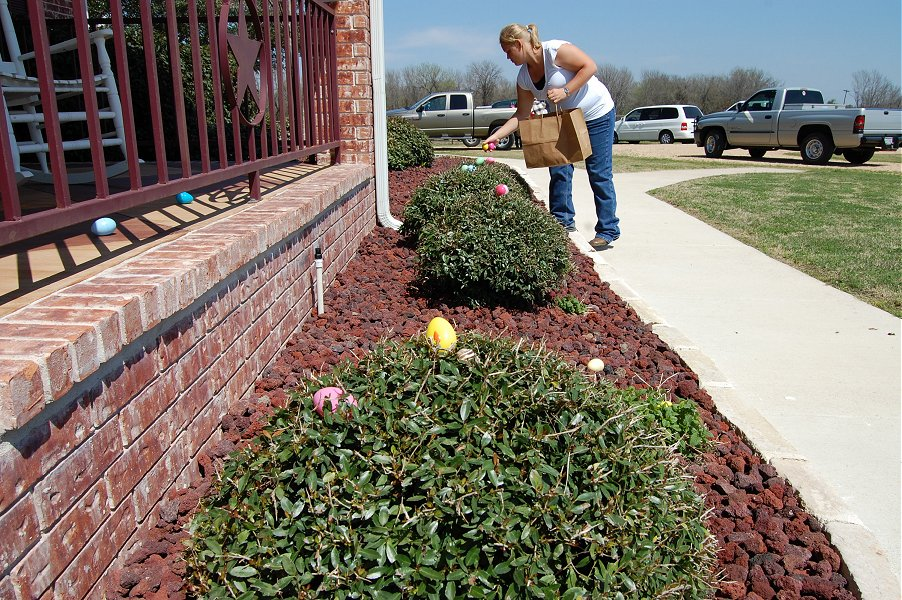
A woman hides Easter eggs for preschool-aged children to find. She is careful not to make their location and retrieval too difficult.

Reverend MaryJane Pierce Norton, Associate General Secretary of Leadership Ministries at the General Board of Discipleship, states that "there's something about going to hunt the eggs just as we might go to hunt for Jesus in the tomb. And when we find them it's that joy that the women had when they reached the tomb first and found that Jesus was no longer there." Traditionally the game is associated with Easter and Easter eggs, but it has also been popular with spring time birthday parties. Egg hunts are a subject of the Guinness Book of World Records; Homer, Georgia, United States was listed in 1985 with 80,000 eggs to hunt in a town of 950 people.

To enable children to take part in egg hunts despite visual impairment, eggs have been created that emit various clicks, beeps, noises, or music.

== Commercial use ==
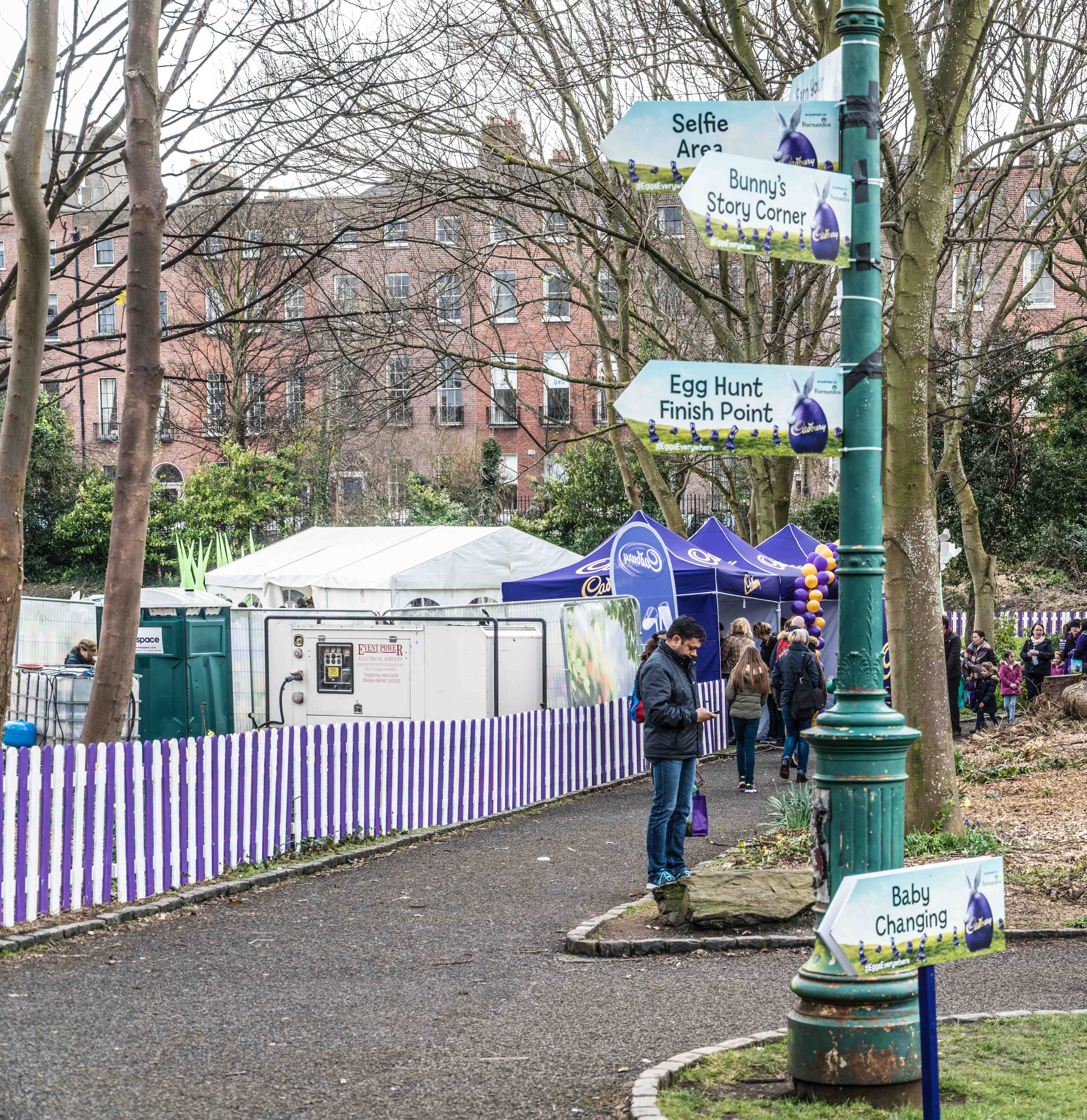
Cadbury Easter egg hunt in 2016

A number of companies have made use of the popularity of Easter and more specifically Easter egg hunts to promote the sales of their candy products. Most notable have been chocolatiers including Cadbury with their annual Easter Egg Trail which takes place in over 250 National Trust locations in the UK. In 2015, the British chocolate company Thorntons worked with the geocaching community to hide chocolate eggs across the United Kingdom.

== See also ==
- Egg and spoon race
- Egg dance
- Egg rolling
- Egg tapping
- Pace Egg play
- Easter basket
- Scavenger hunt
