= Egg dance =

Traditional Easter game

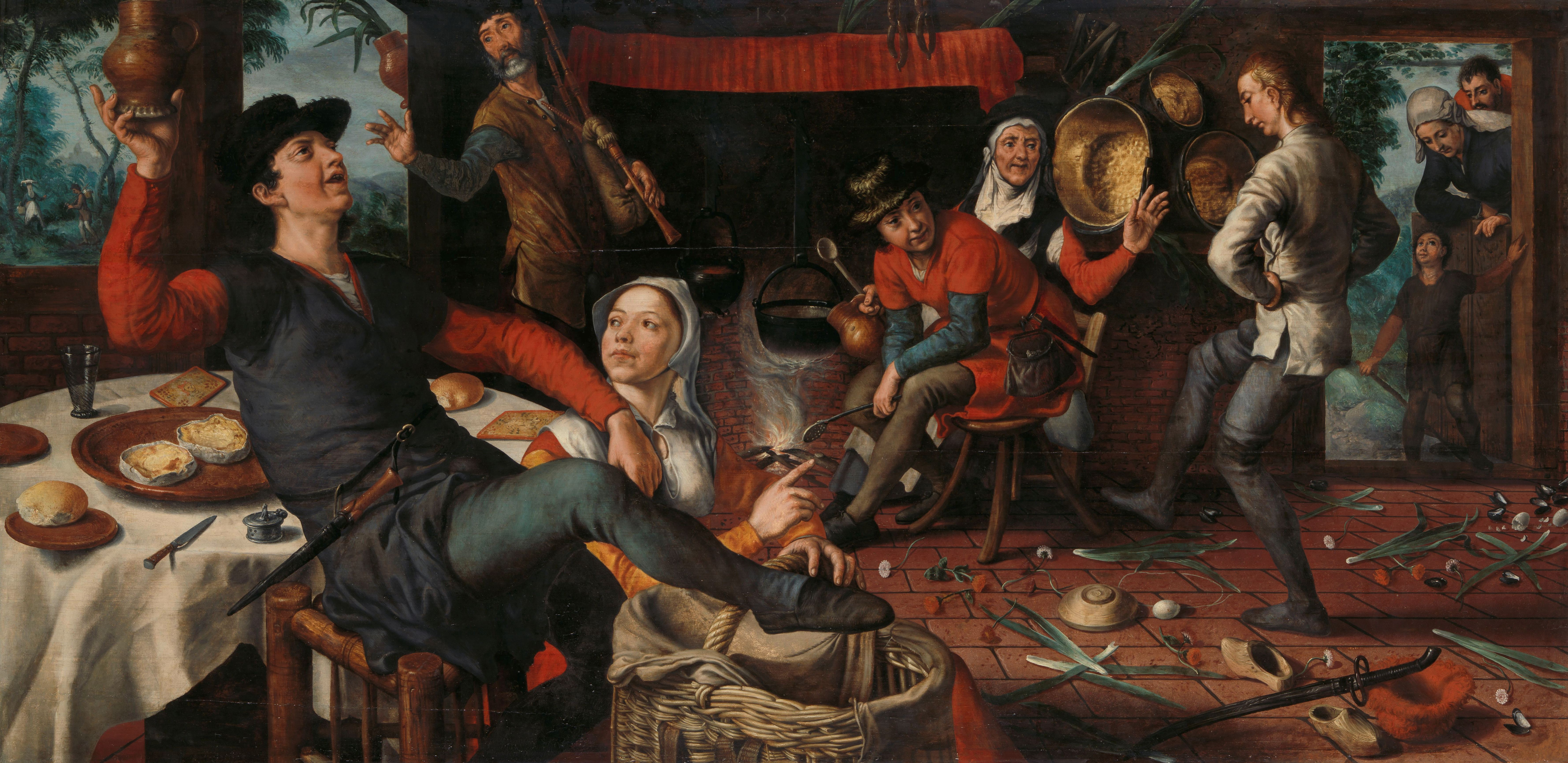
Pieter Aertsen, The Egg Dance (1552)

An egg dance is a traditional Easter game in which eggs are laid on the ground or floor, and the goal is to dance among them, damaging as few as possible. The egg was a symbol of the rebirth of the earth in Pagan celebrations of spring, and was adopted by early Christians as a symbol of the rebirth of man at Easter.

Another form of egg dancing was a springtime game depicted in the painting of Pieter Aertsen. The goal was to roll an egg out of a bowl while keeping within a circle drawn by chalk, and then flip the bowl to cover the egg. This had to be done with the feet without touching the other objects placed on the floor.

An early reference to an egg dance was at the wedding of Margaret of Austria and Philibert of Savoy on Easter Monday of 1498. The event was described in an 1895 issue of The American Magazine as follows.

Then the great egg dance, the special dance of the season, began. A hundred eggs were scattered over a level space covered with sand, and a young couple, taking hands, began the dance. If they finished without breaking an egg they were betrothed, and not even an obdurate parent could oppose the marriage.

After three couples had failed, midst the laughter and shouts of derision of the on-lookers, Philibert of Savoy, bending on his knee before Marguerite, begged her consent to try the dance with him. The admiring crowd of retainers shouted in approval, "Savoy and Austria!" When the dance was ended and no eggs were broken the enthusiasm was unbounded.

Philibert said, "Let us adopt the custom of Bresse." And they were affianced, and shortly afterward married.

In the United Kingdom, the dancing takes the form of hopping and sometimes called the hop-egg. There were various forms of egg-dance, but Mark Knowles writes that it was brought to England from Germany by the Saxons as early as the 5th century. The Saxon word hoppe means "to dance".

The 1867 book The Sports and Pastimes of the People of England reads:

The indication of such a performance occurs in an old comedy, entitled The longer thou livest, the more Foole thou art, by William Wager in the reign of Queen Elizabeth, where we meet with these lines:

Upon my one foote pretely I can hoppe.
And daunce it trimley about an egge.

Dancing upon one foot was exhibited by the Saxon gleemen, and probably by the Norman minstrels, but more especially by the women-dancers, who might thence acquire the name of hoppesteres, which is given by Chaucer. A vestige of this denomination is still retained, and applied to dancing, though somewhat contemptuously; for an inferior dancing-meeting is generally called a hop.

Hopping matches for prizes were occasionally made in the sixteenth century, as we learn from John Heywoode the epigrammatist. In his Proverbs printed in 1566, are the following lines:

Where wooers hoppe in and out, long time may bring
Him that hoppeth best at last to have the ring

But to return to the egg-dance. This performance was common enough about thirty years back and was well received at Sadler's Wells; where I saw it exhibited, not by simply hopping round a single egg, but in a manner that much increased the difficulty. A number of eggs, I do not precisely recollect how many, but I believe about twelve or fourteen, were placed at certain distances marked upon the stage; the dancer, taking his stand, was blind-folded, and a hornpipe being played in the orchestra, he went through all the paces and figures of the dance, passing backwards and forwards between the eggs without touching them.

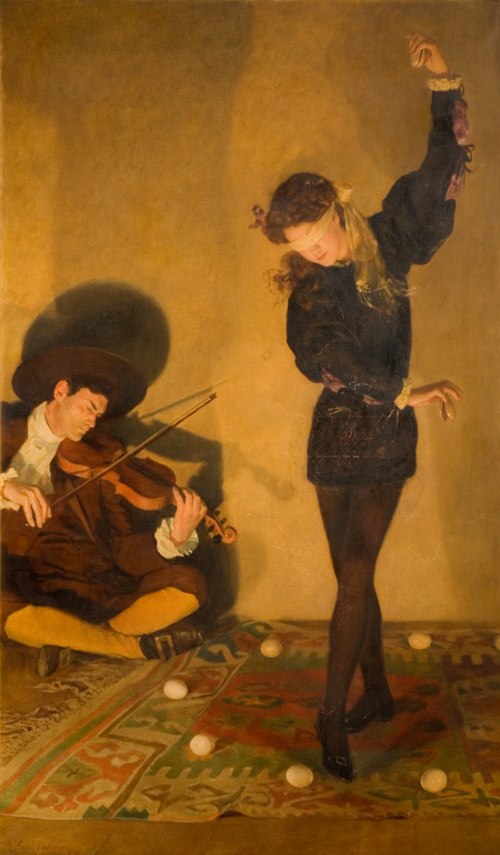
Egg-Dance by John Collier, The New Art Gallery Walsall

The hornpipe was one of dances performed as an egg dance. Sometimes it was danced blindfolded. For example, the famous American hornpipe dancer John Durang performed one of his hornpipes blindfolded on a scene covered with eggs, as did Barnett Nathan on a stage full of eggs and tea-things.

Julian Mates in his book The American Stage before 1800 notes that blindfolded egg dances were a popular musical act both in Europe and the United States during the 18th century.

== See also ==
- Easter egg
- Egg hunt
- Egg rolling
- Egg tapping
- Pace Egg play
