= Pace Egg play =

Easter custom in Northern England

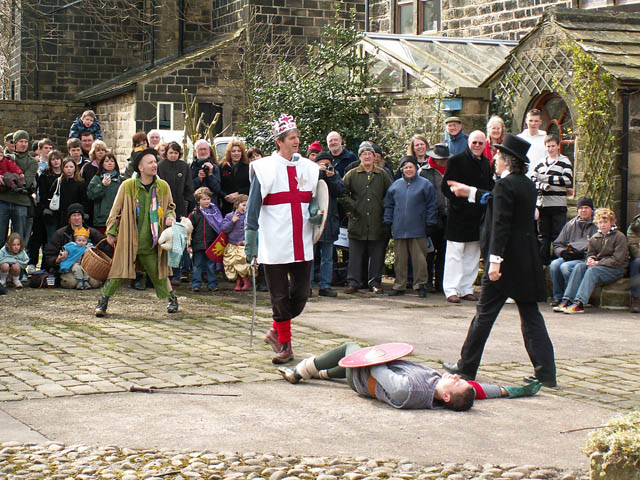
St George slaying Bold Slasher at the Heptonstall Pace Egg Play

The Pace Egg plays are an Easter custom in rural Northern England in the tradition of the medieval mystery plays. The practice was once common throughout Northern England, but largely died out in the nineteenth century before being revived in some areas of Lancashire and the West Riding of Yorkshire in the twentieth century. The plays, which involved mock combat, were performed by Pace Eggers, who sometimes received gifts of decorated eggs from villagers. Several closely related folk songs were associated with Pace Egging.

== Etymology ==
The Oxford English Dictionary gives the forms pace egg (first attested in 1579), paste egg (first attested in 1611), pasch egg (first attested in 1677), and paschal egg (first attested in 1844). The first word of the first three of these names (which on its own is usually spelled pasch) seems to come into English partly from Anglo-Norman pasche (attested to mean both 'Easter' and 'Passover'), whose standard modern French equivalents are pâques 'Easter' and pasque 'Passover'. Anglo-Norman pasche comes in turn from post-classical Latin pascha 'Passover, Passover lamb, Passover meal, Easter', which itself was an earlier source of the English word pasch. Latin pascha comes from Hellenistic Greek πάσχα 'Passover, Passover lamb, Passover meal, Easter', which comes from Aramaic pisḥā 'Passover festival, Passover sacrifice, Passover meal', which comes from Hebrew pesaḥ 'Passover', itself deriving from the Hebrew verb pāsaḥ 'to pass or spring over'.

== Activities ==
=== The Pace Egging Play ===
The drama takes the form of mock combat between the hero and villain, in which the hero is killed and brought back to life, often by a quack doctor. In some plays the figure of St George smites all challengers, and the fool, Toss Pot, rejoices. In other versions, the antagonist is a Turkish knight. Other characters are called the Noble Youth, the Lady Gay, the Soldier Brave.

=== The Pace Eggers ===
The bands of performers, called Pace Eggers, were locals who performed in their surrounding villages. They often blacked their faces (as was common in English folk traditions such as Border Morris) and wore animal skins, ribbons or coloured paper, masks, and sometimes wooden swords.

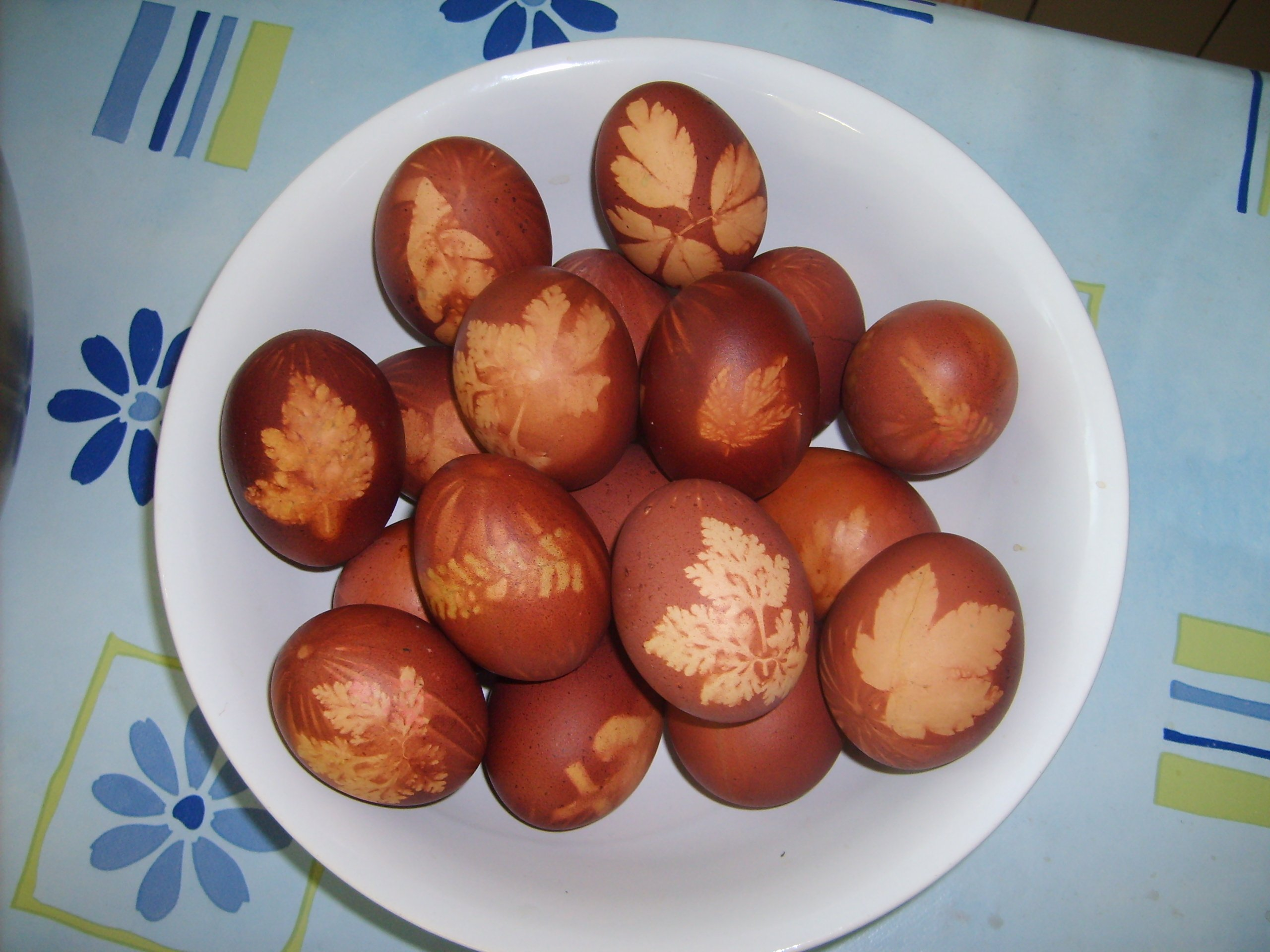
Pace eggs boiled with onion skins and leaf patterns

=== The eggs ===
Traditionally, eggs were wrapped in onion skins and boiled to make their shells look like mottled gold, or wrapped in flowers and leaves first in order to leave a pattern, a custom also practised in traditional Scandinavian culture. Eggs could also be drawn on with a wax candle before staining, often with a person's name and date on the egg. Pace Eggs were generally eaten for breakfast on Easter Sunday breakfast. Alternatively, they could be kept as decorations, used in special games, or given to the Pace Eggers. More recently, eggs have been stained with coffee grains or simply boiled and painted in their shells.

=== The songs ===
Pace Egging songs are categorised as number 614 and 610 in the Roud Folk Song Index. Percy Grainger collected a version in Kirkby Lonsdale, Westmoreland in 1905, and Anne Gilchrist collected one in nearby Casterton in 1909. In the early 1930s, the American folklorist James Madison Carpenter recorded a version from a man named Herbert James Blades in Hunton, Yorkshire, who had learnt the song 40 years prior from a Thomas Thompson (born c.1810); the recording is available on the Vaughan Williams Memorial Library website.

Pace egging originally involved young boys collecting money and begging for pace eggs, with the drama being an 18th-century Lancashire addition. The 'captain' of the group of boys would sing something along the lines of the following:

Here’s two or three jolly boys, all o' one mind,
We've come a pace-egging and I hope you’ll prove kind,
I hope you’ll prove kind, with your eggs and your beer,
For we'll come no more pace-egging until the next year.

== History ==
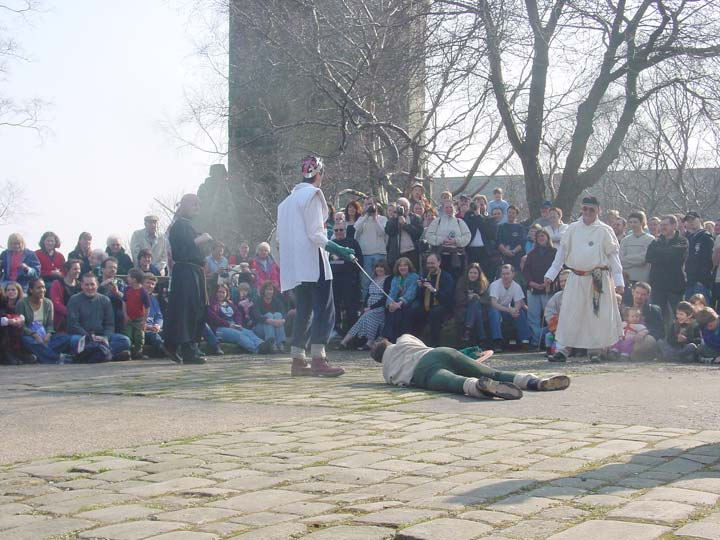
Pace Egg Play, Upper Calder Valley

Pace Egging is hundreds of years old and its origins are unknown.

Pace Egg plays were most common in Northern England, in the counties of Lancashire, Yorkshire and Northumberland.

Pace egging was in decline by 1842. Many Pace Egg plays died out after the First World War, when many of the men who took part in them were killed in action.

== Revival ==
In Middleton, North Manchester, Pace Egging (performing the Pace Egg Play) was revived in 1967. The Bury Pace-Eggers were revived in 1970, and still perform in pubs and squares around the town and surrounding villages in the week before Easter.

Midgley Pace Egg was performed by children from the village's primary school, but in recent decades older children from the nearby Calder High School took over. That school is no longer interested in such things, but ex-pupils maintain the tradition, performing in the original Midgley, West Yorkshire location as well as at the tourist magnet, Heptonstall.

The plays enjoyed a renaissance in Heptonstall, West Yorkshire in recent decades. The origins are uncertain, but appear to be based on the Midgley tradition. Some versions of the plays have undoubtedly been performed over many hundreds of years. It has become an established Good Friday tradition, and hundreds come to Weavers Square to watch.

== See also ==
- Mummers play
- Egg dance
- Saint George's Day in England
- Blackface and Morris dancing
