= Easter witch =

In Swedish folklore, a witch on flying broomstick at Easter

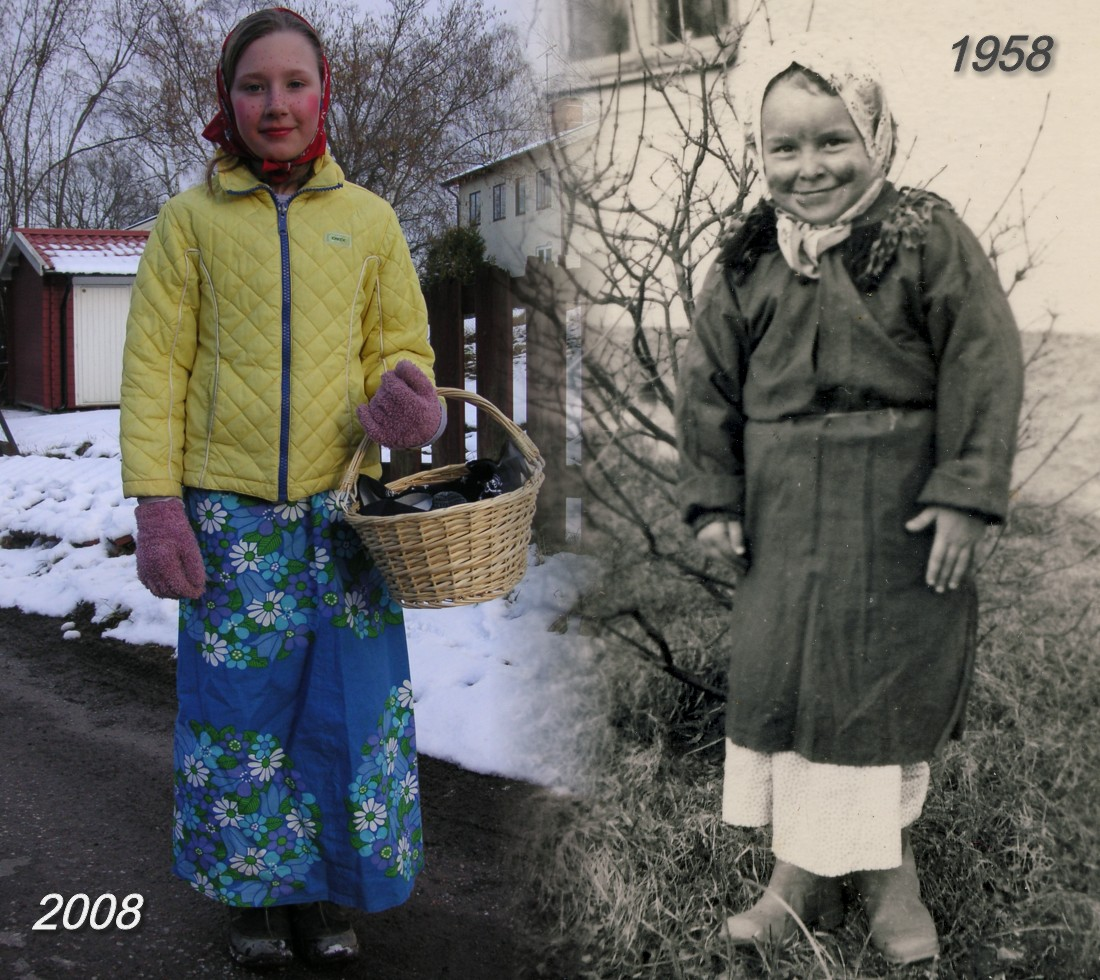
Easter witches in 2008 and 1958

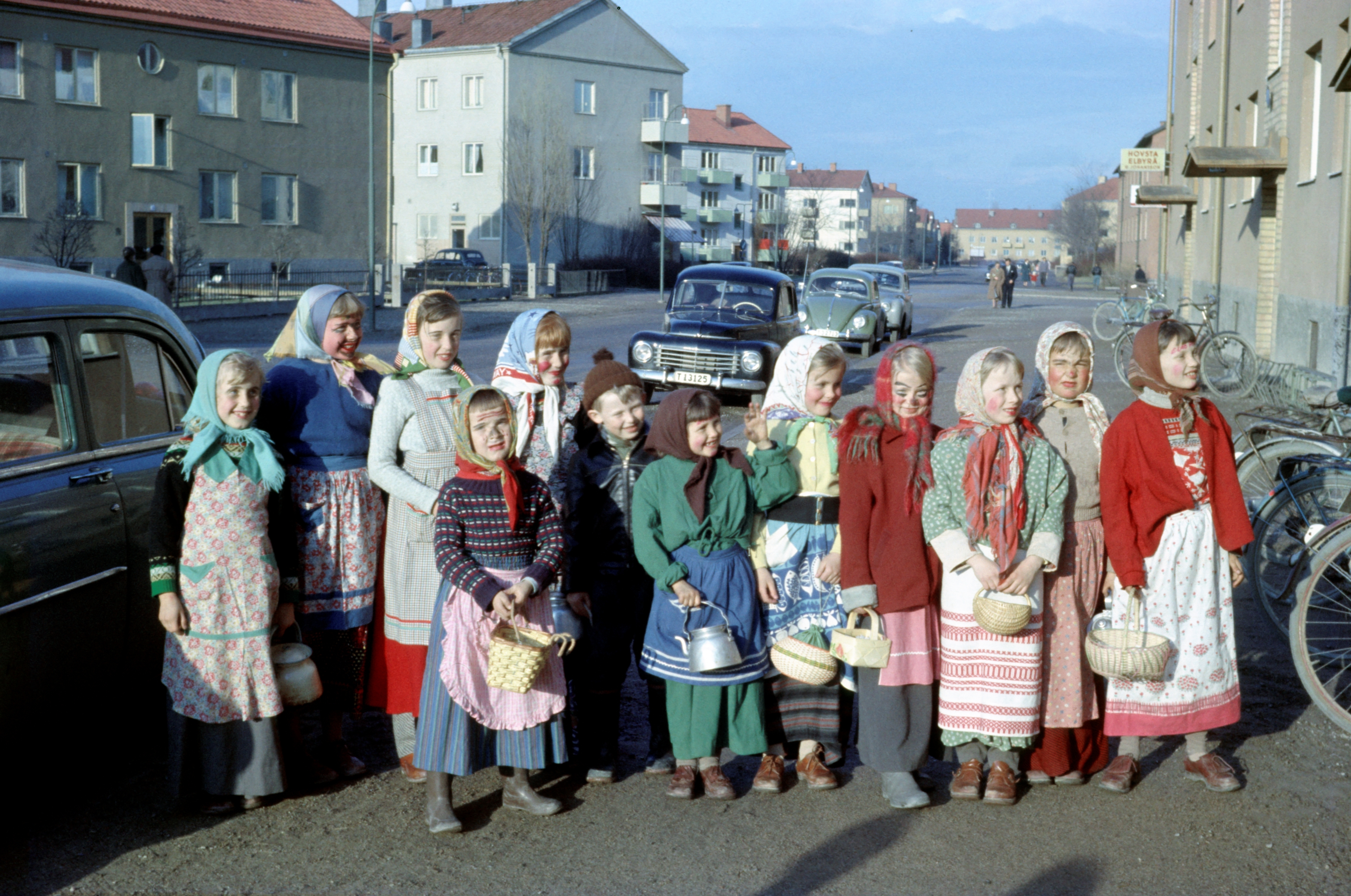
Easter witches in Örebro, Sweden (1957)

Easter witches (Swedish: påskkärring, 'easter hag', 'easter witch', Finland Swedish: påskhäxa, 'easter witch', Finnish: trulli, 'trulli') is an old Swedish legend about witches flying to Blockula (Swedish: Blåkulla, Blå Jungfrun) on brooms on the Thursday before Easter (Maundy Thursday, sv:Skärtorsdagen) or on the night between the Wednesday (Holy Wednesday, sv:Dymmelonsdag) and Thursday before, and returning on Easter.

It is uncertain when the tradition of dressing up as witches began in Sweden, but the custom was widespread in western Swedish cities by the mid-19th century. Therefore, the first Easter witches probably date from the late 18th century. Easter witches were most commonly reported from Bohuslän, Dalsland, Värmland and parts of Västergötland, and it was mainly during the evening of Holy Saturday that they went door to door. Originally, it was adults and young people who dressed up as Easter witches, but over time it became more of a children's tradition.

In the modern era, children dress up as witches, old ladies or in old men's clothing and go door to door distributing greetings and often receiving treats in return. In Finland, the Easter witch custom (virvonta) comes from the old Karelian Orthodox Christian tradition, and is observed on Palm Sunday.

== Witch persecutions ==
In the 17th century, fear of witches caused brutal persecution of innocent people and trials. Several hundreds were tortured to death in Sweden, about 280 between 1668 and 1676. The last woman was wrongfully sentenced in 1704 but it was not until 1779 that the death penalty for witchcraft was repealed. Because of this during this time period doors and dampers were secured to guard against the travel of the witches to Blåkulla to meet the Devil. Any tools the witches could use on their trip were put away on Maundy Thursday. Barn doors were secured to prevent the witches from milking or riding the animals.

== Modern times ==
In Sweden and Finland, it is an Easter tradition for children to dress as witches, old women and old men and go door to door for treats similar to the trick-or-treating tradition of Halloween on Maundy Thursday or the day before Easter (Holy Saturday). The children sometimes present hand-made cards and other greetings. Related to warding off witchcraft and at a similar time of year is the Walpurgis Night celebration.

== Image gallery ==
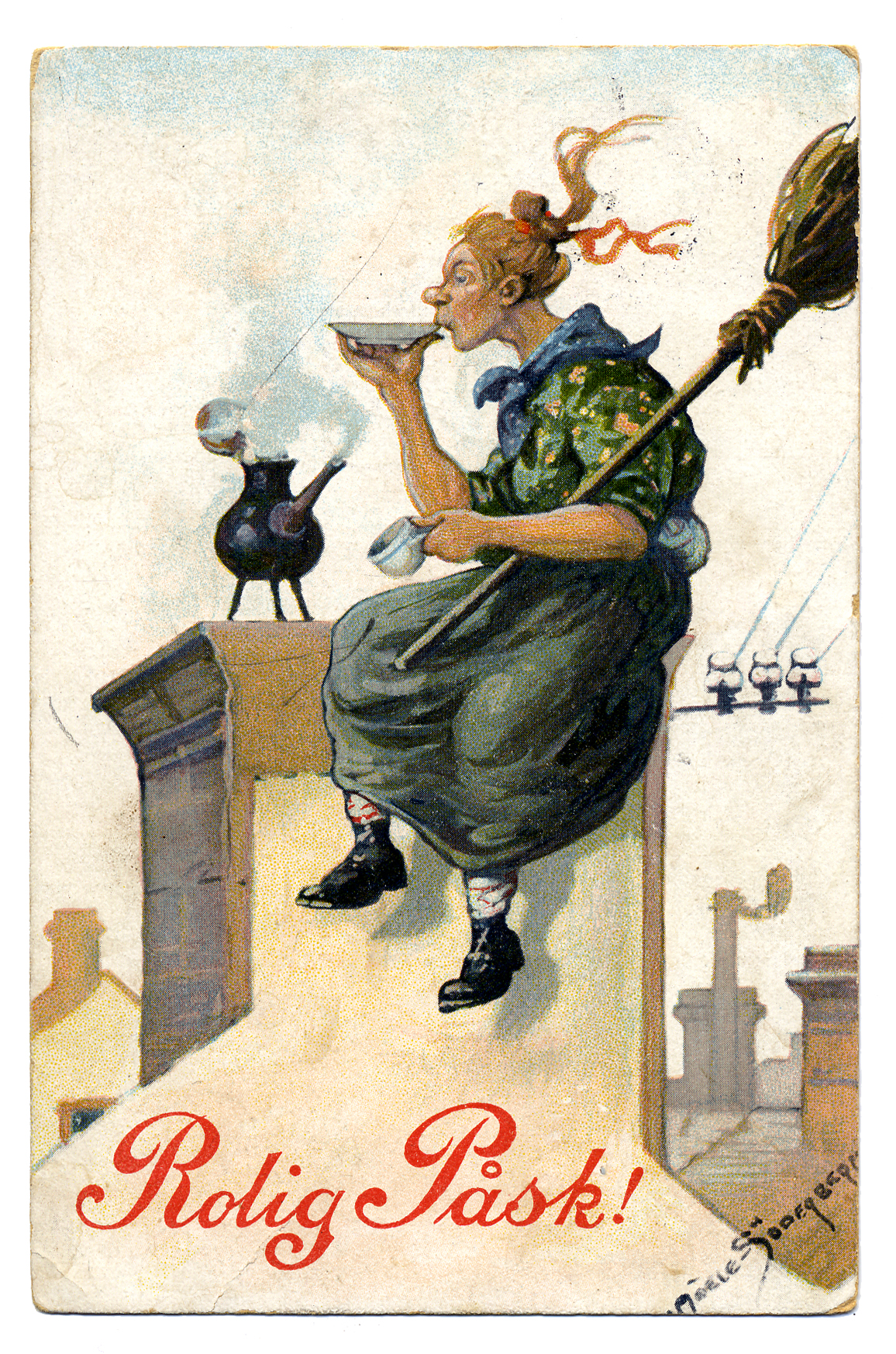
Swedish Easter card from 1916. Witch with broom and coffee pot.

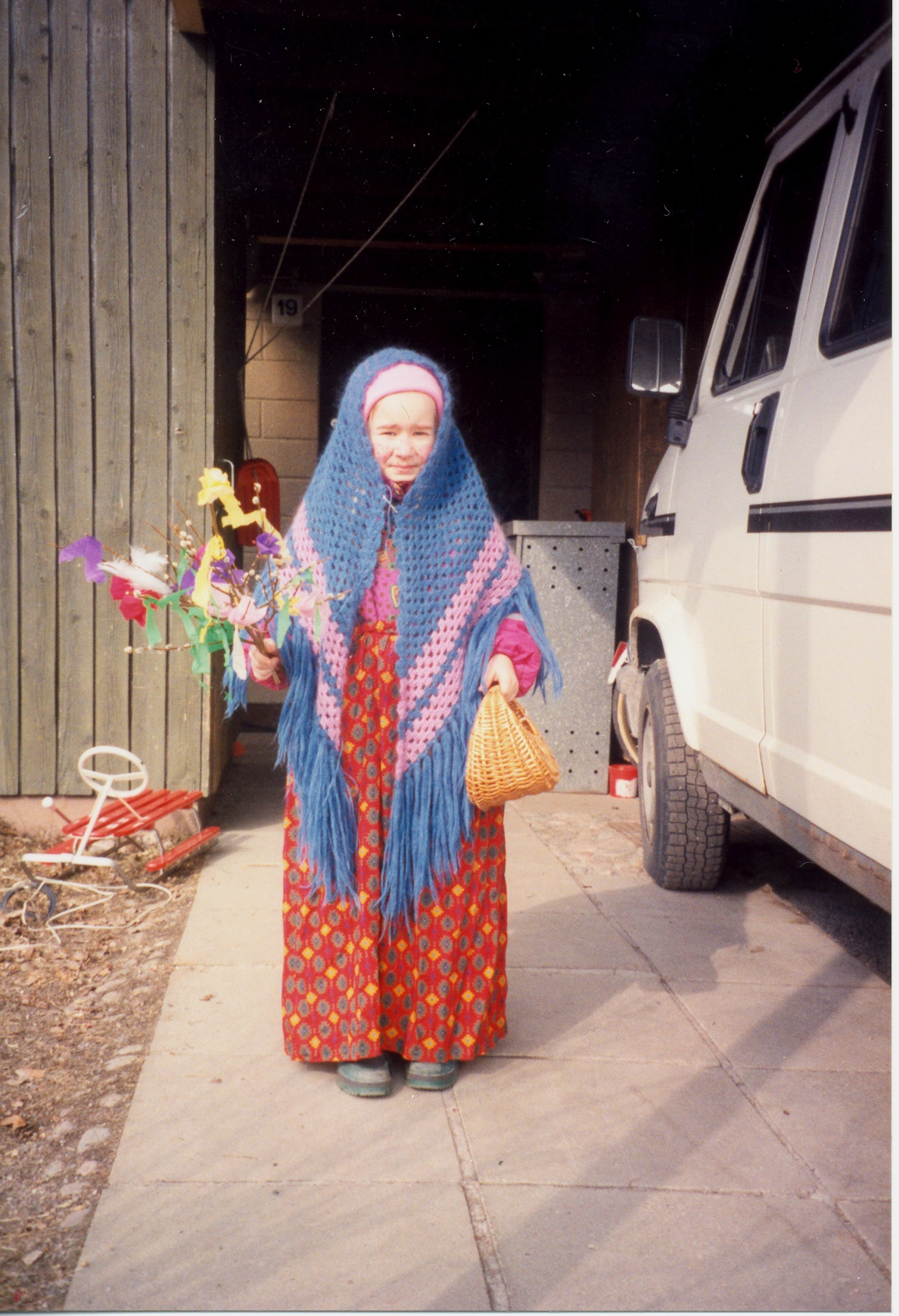
Easter witch handing out gifts (tree twigs) in Finland in 1998. The small basket is for thank you gifts.

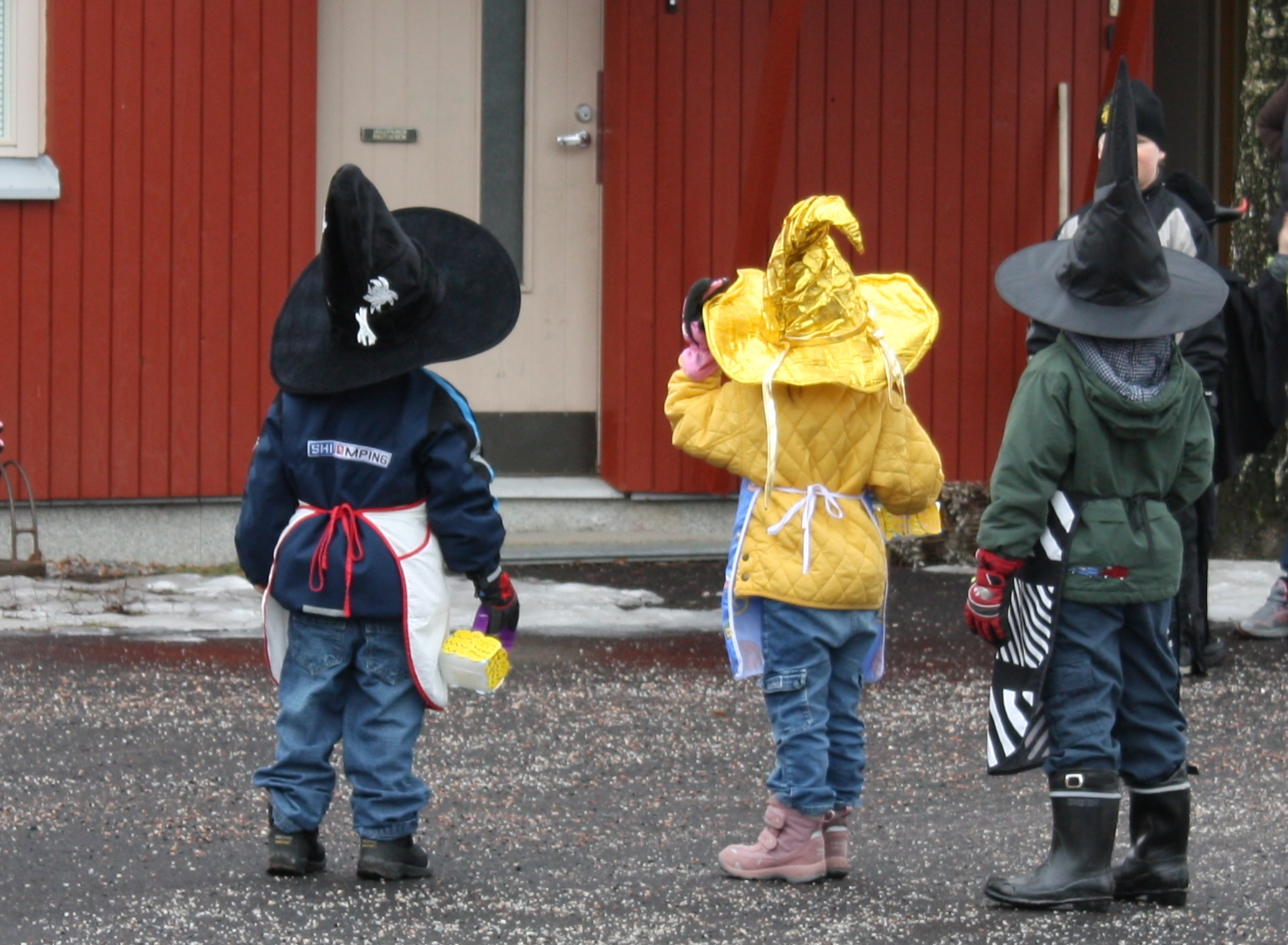
Boys dressed as witches in Finland in 2009
