= Virvonta =

Finnish Palm Sunday tradition

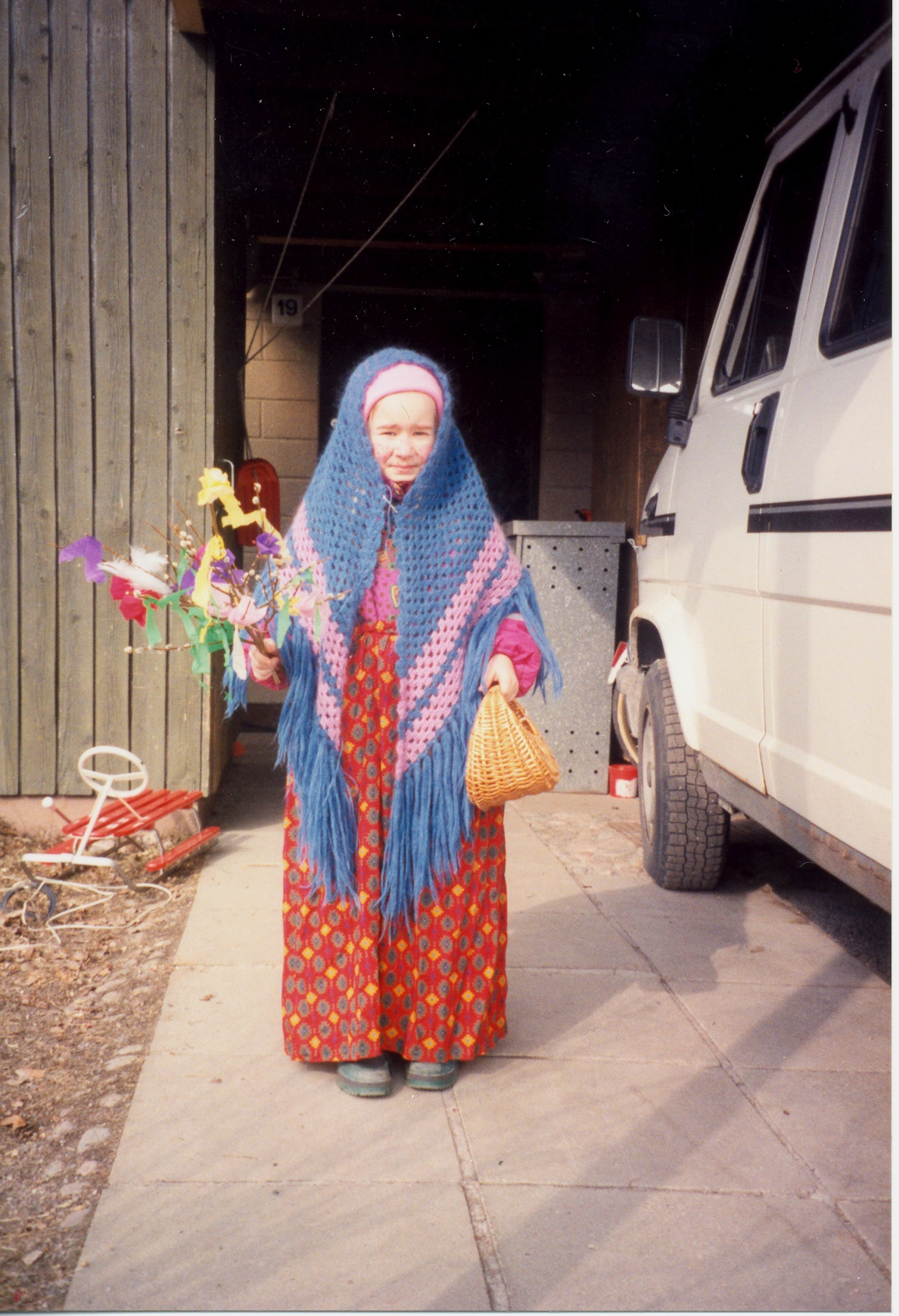
An "easter witch" from Kerava, 1998

The virvonta or virpominen (meaning the act of refreshment or wishing) is performed by Finnish children on Palm Sunday to wish well to the households. In parts of Ostrobothnia, the custom is observed on the Saturday before Easter.

In modern times, children dress as witches and knock at neighbours' doors while carrying salix tree branches (pussy willow), often decorated with colourful feathers. If accepted, they pronounce a blessing rhyme and leave a branch as gift, while receiving sweets in return.

Virvonta was formed from a mixture of blessing customs that had been maintained by Orthodox Christians in Eastern Finland and a Western Finnish trulli tradition that is akin to the Swedish easter witch practice with pre-Christian roots.

== History ==
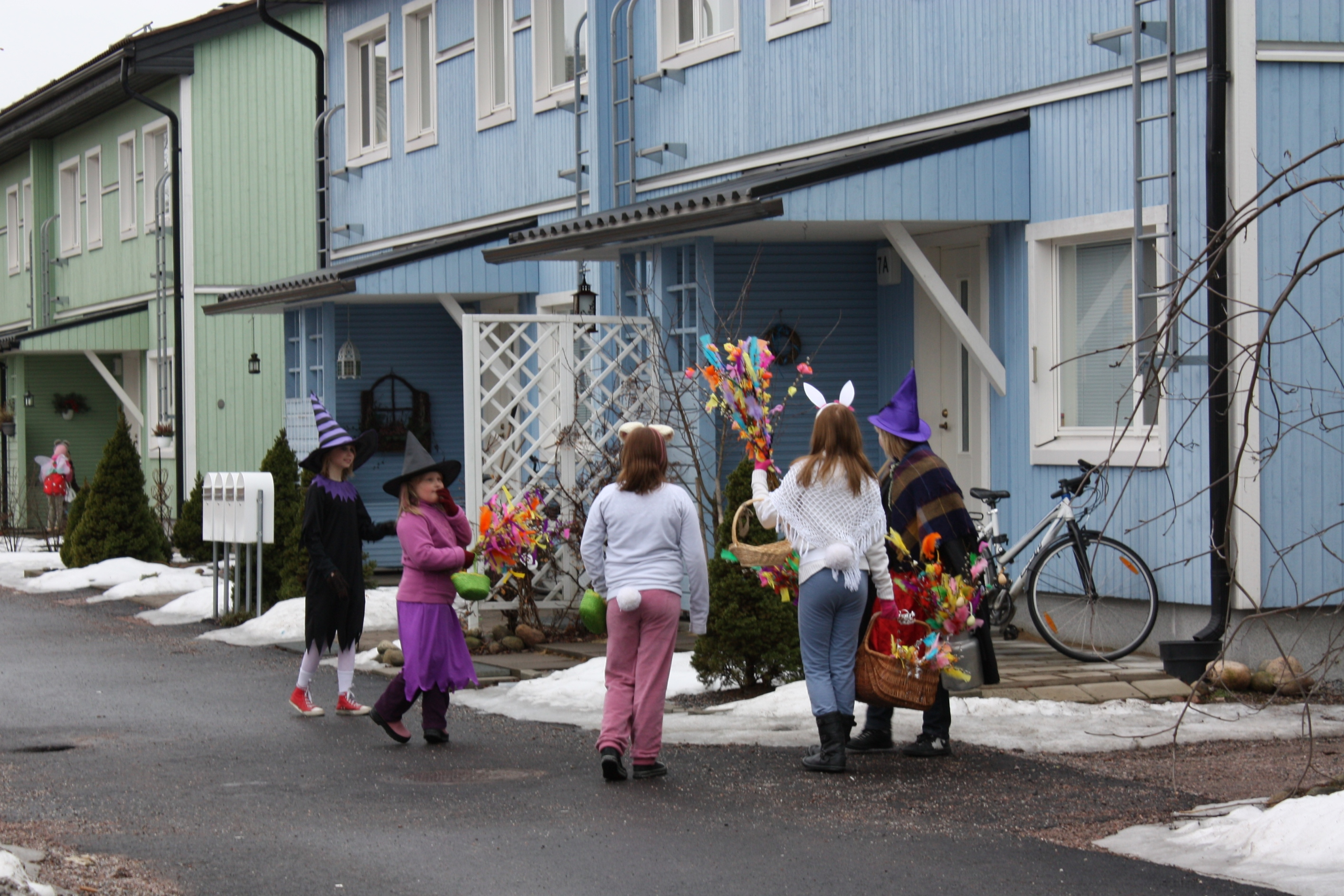
Children go to collect candy from the neighborhood

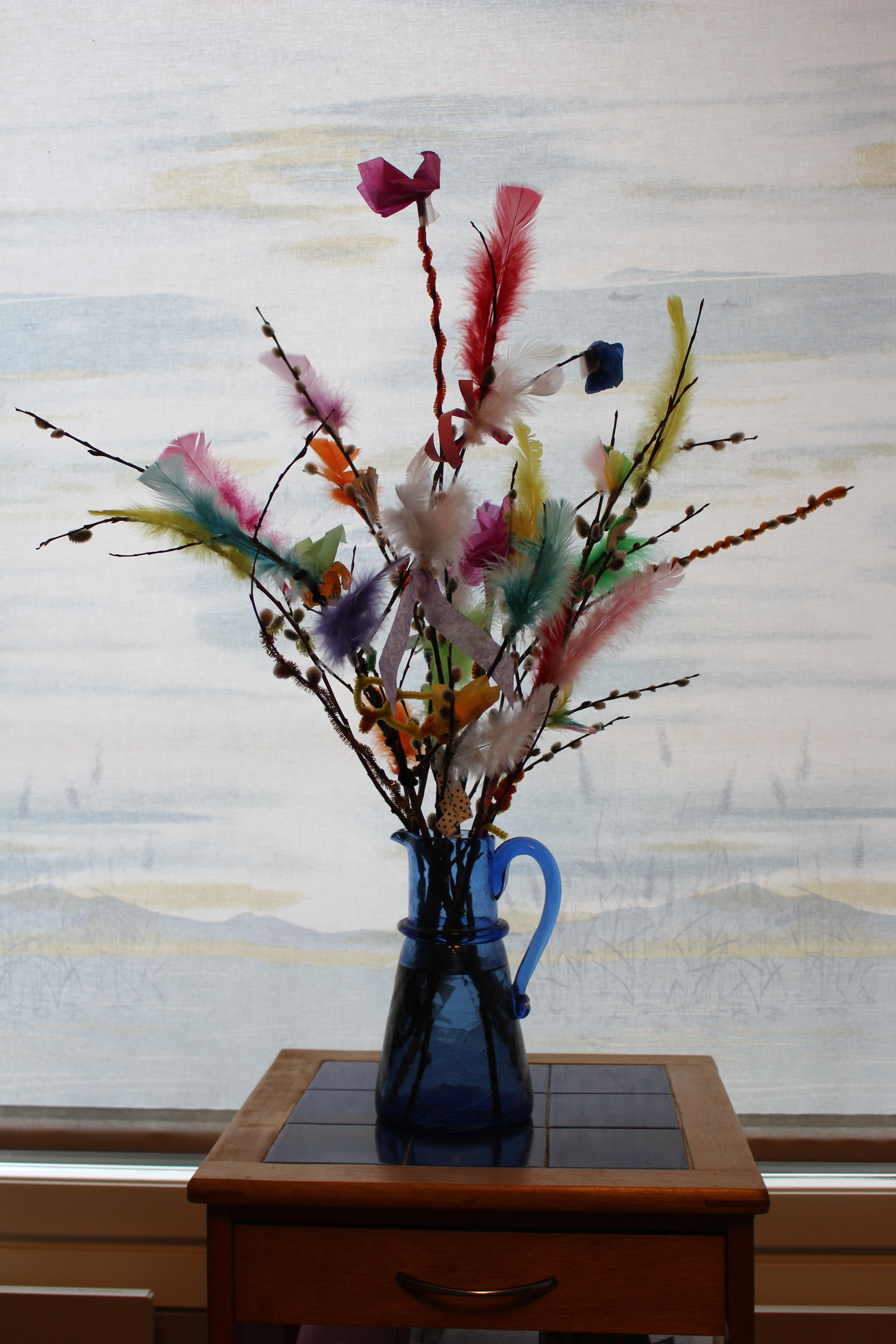
Virvonta branches

The tradition has various pagan and Christian origins: Nordic spring traditions to dispel bad spirits and wish a good harvest season, as well as the Christian ritual of the palms. During the medieval period, a Christian custom that resembled the virvonta tradition was known in both Western and Eastern Finland. After the Protestant Reformation in the 16th century, it was forbidden and eventually disappeared among the Finns who converted to the Lutheran Church. It was maintained by Eastern Orthodox Christians in Eastern Finland. The Orthodox tradition involves children giving blessings with branches that have been distributed at church celebrations; it spread from the Eastern Finland with the evacuation of Finnish Karelia in 1944 and mixed with unrelated Western Finnish customs involving witch costumes. The tradition had already been re-adopted by Lutheran Finns in Eastern Finland from Orthodox Karelians before it was revitalized in other parts of the country in its modern form.

A common rhyme is "Virvon varvon tuoreeks, terveeks, tulevaks vuodeks, vitsa sulle, palkka mulle!" which translates as "I'm wishing you a fresh, healthy upcoming year, a branch for you, a reward for me!" The chant has been translated in Juha Vuorinen's novel Totally Smashed! as "Willow switch, I'm the Easter witch! I wish you health and a love that's rich! From me I bring some luck today, for this branch what will you pay?" However, many alternatives are known.

In the 21st century, the tradition has been mixed with international customs such as trick-or-treating and wearing various costumes. It may be more common to see kids dressed as other magical characters such as wizards, cats, bunnies or other animals.
