= Georgian slang =

Colloquialisms in the Georgian language

Georgian slang (Georgian: ქართული ჟარგონი, romanized: kartuli zhargoni) (Note: It may also be referred as, (Georgian: ჟარგონული ქართული, romanized: zhargonuli kartuli) or (Georgian: ქართული სლენგი, romanized: kartuli slengi).) is the colloquial terminology of Georgian, a Kartvelian language that is an official language of Georgia. One of the first to document Georgian slang was a lexicographer and diplomat under King Vakhtang VI, Prince Sulkhan-Saba Orbeliani.

Georgian also has a variety of highly inflammatory and vulgar slurs, that develops into Georgian profanity. With the rapid development of technology, Georgian is also actively utilizing the terms from the internet slang, predominantly the Anglicisms, (Note: The anglicisms are gaining the ground in Georgian slang, through its influence in media, television and internet by actively replacing Russian as a foreign language of prestige in Georgia. The public attitude in the country is shown to be linked with two types of globalization; interconnectedness and expansion. English is seen as interconnectedness, while Russian, language of an expansion. It is noteworthy, that the term "barbarism" in Georgian refers mainly to Russian terms and loanwords.) through Georgianizing them with its own complex rules of conjugation and suffixes. Some Georgian lexicographers and scholars highly criticize (Note: The critics see the colloquialization and democratization of Georgian as a real threat to its homogeneity. They assert that any language reform or foreign intrusion warrants for the struggle for Georgian national identity. Historically, the Georgians are well-documented to be "highly language-conscious society" having their native tongue define their "Georgianness". On the other hand, as Arnold Chikobava, a prominent linguist and philologist puts it "language dies if nobody uses it; or when a language has only a limited platform".) the increasing slang takeover, proposing to ban it, while others maintain it is a global phenomenon for any language and probably irreversible.

== Phrases ==
For exact and comprehensive pronunciation of words and phrases, especially ones written with the apostrophes, the rules of romanization of Georgian and IPA are essential.

=== A ===
აუ
au - oh dear.
აადგა
aadga - used to describe a situation when a person visits another party without an invitation, possibly with a dangerous intent.
აბამს
abams - used to describe a person who tries to flirt, pick up or seduce a girl.
აბდაუბდა
abdaubda - nonsense.
აბიჟნიკი
abizhnik'i - a person who hurts and disrespects a person in purpose but with no actual reason. The term is derived from Russian (Note: Generally, the Russian words and borrowings are considered as barbarisms, when they are used by the same meaning in Georgian slang as they have in standard Russian, but some specific Georgianized terms cannot be attested or understood in spoken Russian.) obizhat (обижать).
აბირჟავებს
abirzhavebs - a person who is simply hanging out and killing time in his neighborhood or area of residence.
აბოლებს
abolebs - used to describe a situation when a person is actively trying to lie to someone about something.
აბრახუნებს
abrakhunebs - used to describe a situation when a person is actively telling silly things to someone about something. Term literally means "hitting something loudly".
ავარდა
avarda - used to describe a moment when a person was deceived and lied to or easily provoked over something.
აზრზეა
azrzea - used to describe a person who is well aware of things in life, is smart and that won't be deceived easily.
აზრზე მოსული
azrze mosuli - used to describe a person who is well aware of things in life, is smart and that won't be deceived easily.
ათიანში
atianshi - used to describe a moment when a person guesses something and gets right on point. Term literally means "you got right in 10".
აიასნებს
aiasnebs - used to describe a situation when a person tries to settle and debate a dispute with a conflicting party. The term is derived from Russian yasni (ясный).
აკიმარებს
ak'imarebs - used to describe a person who is sleepy.
აკრეფილია
ak'repilia - used to descirbe a person who is angry.
ამარიაჟებს
amariazhebs - used to describe a person who is actively peacocking, signaling and flexing stuff; wants to stand out.
ანაბანა
anabana - extremely easy. The term derives from word "alphabet".
აპინა
ap'ina - used to describe a moment when a person pinned something on the internet.
აჟრიალებს
azhrialebs - used to describe a person who is crazy. The term literally means "a person who is shaking".
არ არსებობს
ar arsebobs - means "oh no way"; describing something impressive and unbelievable. The term literally means "it does not exist".
ასიანი
asiani - used to describe a person who is right on point; who is right and correct. The term means "a person of 100", as a word asi means 100.
ასი წელი
asi ts'eli - never; The term literally means "100 years".
ასწია
asts'ia - used to describe a situation when a person steals something. The term literally means to "pick up something".
ასწორებს
asts'orebs - used to describe a situation when something cool, fun and extraordinary is happening; good vibe. The term literally means "something is making this right".
ატმასკა
at'mask'a - a support one may receive in a quarrel or a fight.
აფრენს
aprens - used to describe a person who likes something or someone intensely. The term literally means "a person who makes it fly".
აფანატებს
apanat'ebs - used to describe a person who likes something or someone intensely. The term literally means "a person who makes it to be a fan".
აფუილებს
apuilebs - used to describe a situation when a person is smoking a cigarette.
აღუა
aghua - new-born baby.
აუხტა
aukht'a - to argue with someone or debate in an aggressive manner.
აურია
auria - to cause a disturbance and make a scene.
აუდო
audo - to run away cowardly; to flee.
აუცვა
autsva - to run away cowardly; to flee.
აითესა
aitesa - to run away cowardly; to flee.
ააგდო
aagdo - to get a woman or an item with deception or manipulation.
აჭამა
ach'ama - to lie and deceive someone. The term literally means "to feed someone with something".
ახეხინეს
akhekhines - to get a long sentence in prison. The term literally means "one who was forced to clean something".
ახვარი
akhvari - a sly, dangerous and despicable person with no moral compass.
ახვევს
akhvevs - used to describe a person who tries to flirt, pick up or seduce a girl.
ახტაჯანა
akht'ajana - tomboy.

=== B ===
ბანძი
bandzi - a person who is considered a loser or an item that is cheap and of low quality.
ბაჭია
bach'ia - sissy, coward. The term literally means a "leveret".
ბაითი
baiti - a cosy and comfortable apartment. The term is derived from Hebrew bayt.
ბაზარი
bazari - a loud conversation. The term is derived from word bazaar.
ბაზარი არაა
bazari araa - when agreeing on something in a confirming manner; yes; absolutely. The term literally means "there is no bazaar".
ბათქი
batki - a hard hit or kick; fight.
ბარო
baro - hi; hey; hello. The term is more used in Tbilisi and is probably derived from Armenian barev (բարև).
ბასტი-ბუბუ
bast'i-bubu - shindy; noisy music.
ბიტი
bit'i - an experienced and streetsmart person. The term is derived from Russian bityi (битый).
ბიძა
bidza - a powerful older man with connections and means. The term literally means an "uncle".
ბლატი
blat'i - connections and privilege through a powerful social circle. The term is derived from Russian mafia verbiage, po blatu (по блату).
ბლატნოი
blat'noi - an arrogant and cocky person; one that has blat'i.
ბლიყვი
bliq'vi - silly, stupid person.
ბნდუ
bndu - silly; stupid.
ბოთე
bote - silly; stupid.
ბოზი
bozi - snitch; an informant. The term literally means a "prostitute".
ბოლო გოიმი
bolo goimi - extremely unsuccessful, useless, and worthless person; a major loser. The term literally means "the last goimi". The term goimi derives from Hebrew goy.
ბულკი
bulk'i - person who is easily defeated in recreational games; a sweet and pleasant person. The term derives from Russian bulka (булка) literally meaning "small loaf".
ბუხოი
bukhoi - drunk and intoxicated. The term is derived from Russian mafia verbiage, bukhoy (бухой).
ბუტია
but'ia - peevish, sulky person.

=== Ch ===
ჩამიჩუმი
chamichumi - tiny noise.
ჩანჩურა
chanchura - clumsy.
ჩასაყლაპი
chasaq'lap'i - yummy; cute.
ჩაზმანული
chazmanuli - well dressed person; a fashionista.
ჩაქცეული
chaktseuli - extremely wealthy person.
ჩერჩეტი
cherchet'i - silly; stupid person.
ჩიფჩიფა
chipchipa - person speaking with a toothless mouth or a lisp.
ჩმორი
chmori - a coward. The term is derived from Russian chmo (чмо).

=== Ch' ===
ჭედავს
ch'edavs - used to describe a situation when a person likes something or someone intensely. The term literally means "something is glitching".
ჭინკა
ch'ink'a - impish, mischievous troublemaker; gremlin.
ჭიჭიკო
ch'ich'ik'o - a cab driver.
ჭრელაჭრულა
ch'relach'rula - something mixed with of all different colours.
ჭუკჭუკი
ch'uk'ch'uk'i - chatting; gossiping.
ჭუჭრუტანა
ch'uch'rut'ana - small hole, gap or crack.
ჭუჭყუნა
ch'uch'q'una - peevish person.

=== D ===
დაალაიკა
daalaik'a - used to describe a moment when a person pushed a like button on something on the internet; The term literally comes from English word "like".
დააყენე
daaq'ene - cut the crap; stop talking or doing nonsense.
დაგუგლა
dagugla - used to describe a moment when a person searched for something on the internet; The term literally comes from "google".
დაიკიდე
daik'ide - take it easy; don't worry about it. The term literally means to "make something hang on yourself".
დალინკა
dalink'a - used to describe a moment when a person linked something on the internet; The term literally comes from English word "link".
დაპოსტა
dap'ost'a - used to describe a moment when a person posted something on the internet; The term literally comes from English word "post".
დატროლა
dat'rola - used to describe a moment when a person trolled someone on the internet; The term literally comes from English word "trolling".
დასინა
dasina - used to describe a moment when a person read a message from someone on the internet; The term literally comes from English word "seen".
დააშეარა
daasheara - used to describe a moment when a person shared something on the internet; The term literally comes from English word "share".
დაუგულა
daugula - used to describe a moment when a person pushed a love button on something on the internet; The term literally means "to heart something".
დასტოინი
dast'oini - used to describe a person who is honorable and respectable. The term is dervied from Russian dastoynny (достойный).
დიშოვი
dishovi - used to describe something that is of poor quality and is cheap. The term is derived from Russian desheviy (дешёвый).
დვიჟენია
dvizhenia - exciting life news and deeds. The term is derived from Russian dvizheniye (движение) meaning "movement".
დაბოლილი
dabolili - stoned.
დაბრედილო
dabredilo - used as an enthusiastic greeting to a close friend, especially if parties haven't met for a long time. The term literally means "you're dead".
დაგაზა
dagaza - to run or go somewhere fast. The term is derived from a word "gas".
დაგლიჯა
daglija - used to describe a situation when something fun, entertaining and extraordinary happens.
დაგნარი
dagnari - a fight.
დაგრუზული
dagruzuli - a person who is on a bad mood. The term is derived from Russian gruzit (грузить), meaning to "load".
დაქალი
dakali - woman's best female friend. The term literally means "sister-woman".
დამპალი
damp'ali - a sly, dangerous and unpleasant person. The term literally means "something that is rotten".
დამრტყმელი
damrt'q'meli - a brave person; fighter. The term literally means "someone who can hit".
დამუღამებული
damughamebuli - some kind of skill that someone is professional and very good at.
დახურა
dakhura - used to describe a moment when something or someone is super fun, entertaining or extraordinary. The term literally means "to close something".
დაჰეითება
daheiteba - to hate someone or something. The term is derived from English.
დაჰაიდება
dahaideba - to hide something from someone; to hide an ad. The term is derived from English.
დე
de - mommy.
დედიკო
dedik'o - mommy.
დერსკი
derski - a troublemaker; it also refers to a bold, brave, fun and cool thing, event or a person. The term is derived from Russian derzkyi (дерзкий).
დონდლო
dondlo - clumsy; lazy.
დონე
done - trendy, cool, great.
დოზანა
dozana - hell.
დოყლაპია
doq'lap'ia - silly; dolt.

=== Dz ===
ძაან
dzaan - very.
ძაღლი
dzaghli - a cop. The term literally means a "dog".
ძიგძიგი
dzigdzigi - party; having fun. The term literally means "shaking, trembling".
ძმაკაცი
dzmak'atsi - man's best male friend. The term literally means "brother-man".
ძველი ბიჭი
dzveli bich'i - teenager or a youngster who is a sympathizer of Georgian mafia or criminal credo. The term literally means "old boy".

=== E ===
ეშმაკუნა
eshmak'una - little devil; petty demon; troublemaker.
ევასა
evasa - used to describe a moment when a person got attracted to someone.
ეკეტება
ek'et'eba - used to describe a moment when a person likes something or someone intensely. The term literally means "something is closing".
ერიჰაა!
erihaa! - oh wow! (bewilderment).

=== G ===
გაბანძებული
gabandzebuli - loser.
გაბლატავებული
gablat'avebuli - brat; spoiled person.
გაგება
gageba - moral compass; life credo. The term is popular through the criminal circles and sympathizers of the Georgian mafia.
გადამგდები
gadamgdebi - liar. The term literally means the "one who throws someone out".
გალეშილი
galeshili - dead drunk.
გატისკული
gat'isk'uli - injured, wounded or beaten person.
გაქანებული
gakanebuli - passionately enthusiastic about something or someone; borderline fanatic.
გაქაჩული
gakachuli - rich and privileged person.
გაჩითული
gachituli - rich and privileged person.
გაყურსული
gaq'ursuli - silent.
გველაძუა
gveladzua - devious, deceitful, sly. The term literally means "baby snake".
გიჟმაჟი
gizhmazhi - crazy; wild; nuts.
გოგჩო
gogcho - a girl.
გოგონა
gogona - a girl.
გოიმი
goimi - unsuccessful, worthless person; loser. The term derives from Hebrew goy.
გოიმური
goimuri - low quality, old-fashioned item or behaviour. The term literally means something that looks like goimi.
გრიალი
griali - party; keipi.
გრუზინი
gruzini - used to describe an uncultured ethnic Georgian person who has no good taste, manners or education. The term is derived from Russian gruzin (грузин) meaning an "ethnic Georgian person". The term has an insulting, pejorative and negative connotation.

=== Gh ===
ღადაობა
ghadaoba - joking; fooling around.
ღორმუცელა
ghormutsela - insatiable eater; Polyphagian. The term literally means "pig belly".

=== H ===
ჰო
ho - yes.
ჰოდა
hoda - in that case (said in reply to proposition).

=== I ===
იმენა
imena - namely; exactly. The term is derived from Russian imenno (именно).
ინჩიბინჩი
inchibinchi - the slightest bit.
იტოგში
it'ogshi - finally; eventually. The term is derived from Russian v itoge (в итоге).

=== J ===
ჯაბახანა
jabakhana - a low quality or an old car; jalopy.
ჯაგა
jaga - uncultured individual who has no good taste, manners or education.
ჯაგიჯუგი
jagijugi - a fight or loud noise.
ჯანდაბა
jandaba - hell.
ჯართი
jarti - a low quality or an old car. The term literally means "junk".
ჯახი
jakhi - heated disagreement, clash, conflict.
ჯიგარი
jigari - a kind person.
ჯოჯო
jojo - ugly woman.
ჯუჯა
juja - midget.
ჯუჯღუნა
jujghuna - peevish person.

=== K ===
ქალაჩუნა
kalachuna - coward; sissy; soy boy.
ქარაფშუტა
karapshut'a - silly.
ქაჯი
kaji - uncultured individual who has no good taste, manners or education.
ქეთინო
ketino - sissy; soy boy.
ქეში
keshi - junkie.
ქინძი
kindzi - silly and stupid person. The term literally means a "coriander".
ქლესა
klesa - obsequious sycophant.
ქლიავი
kliavi - silly and stupid person. The term literally means a "plum".
ქოთქოთი
kotkoti - havoc; noise.
ქურდბაცაცა
kurdbatsatsa - petty thief.

=== K' ===
კაი
k'ai - nice; good.
კაი ბიჭი
k'ai bich'i - a brat that is considered to be a cool guy among his peers; a motherfucker. The term literally means "a good boy".
კაიფი
k'aipi - getting high, stoned; fun.
კაროჩე
k'aroche - shortly; briefly, in short. The term is derived from Russian koroche (короче).
კაჩაობა
k'achaoba - to argue in a disrespectful and threatening manner.
კაცუნა
k'atsuna - weak little man.
კი
k'i - yes.
კისკისა
k'isk'isa - smiley.
კვერცხი
k'vertskhi - a silly person. The term literally means an "egg".
კოკროჭინა
k'ok'roch'ina - cutie patootie.
კომბლე
k'omble - sly person who pretends to be a fool.
კოპწია
k'op'ts'ia - neat, pretty, good-looking.
კვანწია
k'vants'ia - good-looking girl. The term is mostly used in Guria region.
კვაჭი
k'vach'i - artful dodger; fixer.
კუდაბზიკა
k'udabzik'a - arrogant, stuck-up. The term literally means "one who lifts a tail up".
კუდრაჭა
k'udrach'a - sweet, cute and adorable little baby girl.

=== Kh ===
ხიპიში
khip'ishi - a fight or scandal.
ხისთავა
khistava - a stupid person. The term literally means "wooden headed".
ხისთავიანი
khistaviani - a stupid person. The term literally means "one who has a wooden head".
ხიხო
khikho - uncultured individual who has no good taste, manners or education.
ხოშიანი
khoshiani - cool, great, awesome. The term is derived from Persian khosh (خوش).
ხუთჯვრიანი
khutjvriani - Georgian flag. The term literally means "five-crosses".

=== L ===
ლაწირაკი
lats'irak'i - little rascal.
ლახლუხა
lakhlukha - Persian or Kurdish Jew.
ლიმონი
limoni - one million. The term literally means a "lemon".
ლოქო
loko - clumsy; sluggish. The term literally means a "catfish".

=== M ===
მა
ma - daddy.
მაგარი
magari - great, awesome, cool; The term literally means "hard".
მაზიანი
maziani - a gambling bet.
მამიკო
mamik'o - daddy.
მაყუთი
maq'uti - money; cash. The term probably derives from Hebrew.
მასტი
mast'i - dude.
მატრაკვეცა
mat'rak'vetsa - parvenu; teacher's pet.
მაწაკი
mats'ak'i - troublemaker with foul language.
მელაკუდა
melak'uda - crafty, sly, cunning. The term literally means "fox tail".
მელაძუა
meladzua - cunning; sly. The term literally means "baby fox".
მოკეტე!
mok'et'e! - shut up!
მუდო
mudo - nerd; boring person.
მუსუსი
mususi - womanizer, libertine.

=== N ===
ნარკუშა
nark'usha - junkie.
ნაშა
nasha - a chick; a girl that a guy is casually dating. The term is derived from Hebrew nashaim (נָשִׁים).
ნაზიკო
nazik'o - sissy; soy boy.
ნუ
nu - don’t.
ნწუ
nts'u - no.

=== O ===
ოხერი
okheri - sly.
ოხრად
okhrad - a lot; in great numbers; in abundance.

=== P ===
ფაიზაღი
paizaghi - without doubt; absolutely.
ფარჩაკი
parchak'i - unsuccessful and worthless person; loser. The term is derived from Russian mafia verbiage, porchak (порчак).
ფინთი
pinti - nasty; bad; useless.
ფუმფულა
pumpula - fluffy; soft.
ფუფლო
puplo - person who is not paying back a debt over the loss in a bet or a game.

=== P' ===
პანტაპუნტა
p'ant'ap'unt'a - abundant; in large amount.
პაწია
p'ats'ia - teeny tiny.
პეწი
p'ets'i - stylishness.
პიჟონი
p'izhoni - dandy, fop, poser.
პიტალო
p'it'alo - silly, stupid person.
პლანი
p'lani - marijuana.
პონტი
p'ont'i - case, deal.
პრანჭია
p'ranch'ia - show-off; coquette.

=== Q' ===
ყეყეჩი
q'eq'echi - stupid person.
ყიყლიყო
q'iq'liq'o - sissy, soy boy.
ყომარი
q'omari - gambling. The term is derived from Arabic qimār (قمار).
ყოყლოჩინა
q'oq'lochina - arrogant, stuck-up.
ყუმი
q'umi - stupid person.

=== R ===
რავი
ravi - whatever; dunno. used to express uncertainty and indifference, or as a casual conversational filler. The term is derived from ra vitsi (რა ვიცი) meaning "how should I know".
რქიანი
rkiani - uncultured individual who has no good taste, manners or education. The term literally means "horned".
რუსეთუმე
rusetume - Russified Georgian. The term has an insulting, pejorative and negative connotation.

=== S ===
საკაიფო
sak'aipo - cool, fun; awesome.
სამსართულიანი
samsartuliani - extremely profane slur and swearing; The term literally means "a thing with three floors".
სასტავი
sast'avi - group and social circle of young people or close friends who have the same ideas and goals. The term is derived from Russian sostav (состав).
საღოლ
saghol - bravo. The term is derived from Turkic sağol.
სიმონ
simon - mate, dude. Mostly used in Imereti region.
სიფრიფანა
sipripana - extremely light; thin.
სუ!
su! - shh! shush!
სხაპა-სხუპი
skhap'a-skhup'i - gabbling.

=== Sh ===
შავი
shavi - sympathizer or a member of the Georgian mafia or criminal credo. The term literally means "black".
შავი მასტი
shavi mast'i - sympathizer or a member of the Georgian mafia or criminal credo. The term literally means "dude in black".
შამპო
shampo - champagne.
შანსავიკი
shansavik'i - lucky.
შანსიანი
shansiani - lucky.
შანსპეპელა
shansp'ep'ela - lucky. The term literally means "lucky butterfly".
შე
she - you. The term is used as an interjection.
შე ძველო
she dzvelo - hey pal; hey dude.
შე სადა ბანაობ
she sada banaob - what planet are you on? The term is asked as a question implying a respondent should get back to reason and logic and stop being delusional. It literally means "where are you swimming/bathing".
შეჩემა
shechema - my man; my bro; or my dude. The term is extremely versatile, ranging from a harmless, affectionate word of endearment used between close friends to a potentially extremely offensive, vulgar insult depending on the context and relationship. The literal sense is "you, penis of mine".
შეჩემანალა
shechemanala - same as shechema, mostly used in Imereti region.
შეჩემისა
shechemisa - same as shechema.
შატალო
shat'alo - to absent oneself from school (Note: It is noteworthy that, the school slang is used the least in Georgian.) without leave; to play truant.
შებერტყილი
shebert'q'ili - sly and manipulative person.
შემეტენე
shemet'ene - annoying person who always tags along with group desperately eager to fit it.
შეშლილი
sheshlili - mad, insane.
შუხური
shukhuri - fight; conflict.

=== T ===
თავანი
tavani - gambling losses that are due to be paid.
თარსი
tarsi - sly.
თათარი
tatari - Muslim. The term is derived from tatar.
თიში
tishi - awesome, cool, beautiful; dazed state.
თოხლაობა
tokhlaoba - eating food. The term might be derived from Hebrew (אוכל).
თესლი
tesli - sly and dangerous person. Also can be used as a term of admiration for a thing or a person that is beautiful, cool or extraordinary.
თუხთუხი
tukhtukhi - party; having fun. The term literally means "bubbling, boiling".

=== T' ===
ტაატი
t'aat'i - toddling, walking slowly.
ტაკიმასხარა
t'ak'imaskhara - buffoon; clown, jester.
ტერტერა
t'ert'era - Armenian priest.
ტეხავს
t'ekhavs - sucks; used to describe a situation when something unpleasant happened. The term literally means "something broke".
ტინგიცა
t'ingitsa - frivolous.
ტიპი
t'ip'i - dude.
ტიტინა
t'it'ina - burbling; who talks nonsense.
ტო
t'o - eh. It may also have a meaning of mate; pal; dude.
ტლუ
t'lu - uncultured individual with no good taste, manners and education.
ტრულაილა
t'rulaila - silly and annoying person.
ტურტლიანი
t'urt'liani - filthy, dirty.
ტუტუცი
t'ut'utsi - silly, frivolous.
ტუტრუცანა
t'ut'rutsana - silly, frivolous girl.

=== Ts ===
ცისფერი
tsisperi - gay, queer, homosexual male. The term literally means "sky blue color".
ცეტი
tset'i - reckless; silly.
ცვეტში
tsvet'shi - absolutely; without a doubt. The term is derived from Russian tsvet (цвет), literally meaning "color".
ცრუპენტელა
tsrup'ent'ela - lier.
ცუგა
tsuga - dog.
ცუციკი
tsutsik'i - a coward.
ცქნაფა
tsknapa - cute; adorable.

=== Ts' ===
წაკლა
ts'ak'la - bitch.
წაკლაშკა
ts'ak'lashk'a - little bitch.
წამალი
ts'amali - drugs.
წამობრინჯული
ts'amobrinjuli - person who sits arrogantly. The term literally means "bloated like rice".
წაუსნიკერსე
ts'ausnik'erse - to snack. The term literally means to "grab some snickers".
წიწკვი
ts'its'k'vi - young girl.
წუწკი
ts'uts'k'i - greedy.
წუწურაქი
ts'uts'uraki - stingy.

=== U ===
უბერავს
uberavs - used to describe a person who is crazy. The term literally means "a person who is blowing air".
უბრახუნებს
ubrakhunebs - used to describe a person who drinks a lot.
უი
ui - oh no; alas.
ურია
uria - Jew. The term is derived from Uriah.

=== V ===
ვაბშე
vabshe - in general, generally (speaking); altogether. The term is derived from Russian voobshche (вообще).
ვაიმე
vaime - oh dear.
ვერხი
verkhi - power and means someone may have over someone else. The term is derived from Russian verh (верх) meaning "height".
ვიგინდარა
vigindara - despicable person.
ვირეშმაკა
vireshmak'a - malevolent fool. The term literally means "evil donkey".

=== Z ===
ზანგი
zangi - nigger. The term is derived from Persian zang.
ზანტი
zant'i - lazy, idle, unhurried.
ზასი
zasi - snog.
ზლაზნია
zlaznia - sluggish; slow.
ზმანი
zmani - cool clothes or a person with cool clothes.
ზოზინა
zozina - sluggish; slow.

=== Zh ===
ჟოშკა
zhoshk'a - a greedy person.
ჟუჟუნა წვიმა
zhuzhuna ts'vima - light rain.
ჟღალი
zhghali - wine-red; dark red.
ჟღურტულა
zhghurt'ula - twittering; babbling.

== See also ==
- British slang
- Welsh slang

== Bibliography ==
- Bregadze, Levan (2005) Dictionary of Georgian slang, Volume III, Bakur Sulakauri Publishing, Tbilisi
- Rayfield, Donald (2006) A Comprehensive Georgian-English Dictionary, Garnet Publishing, ISBN 978-0-9535878-3-4
- Beridze, Nato (2023) The Trend of Deverbalization of Anglicisms in the Georgian Digital Vocabulary, Erdoğan University Journal of Social Sciences, DOI: 10.34086/rteusbe.1308392
- Kurdadze, Ramaz (2016) Slang Lexical Borrowings in Georgian-Russian Cross-cultural Relations, University of Chicago Center, 6 Rue Thomas Mann, SCCC
- Sukhishvili, Tamar (2019) The Georgian Language: Threats and Challenges, Adam Mickiewicz University in Poznań, DOI 12/2017: 25–37
