= British slang =

English-language slang used in the UK

While some slang words and phrases are used throughout Britain (e.g. knackered, meaning "exhausted"), others are restricted to smaller regions, even to small geographical areas. The nations of the United Kingdom, which are England, Scotland, Wales and Northern Ireland, all have their own slang words. A well known source of slang from London is Cockney Rhyming Slang.

British slang has been the subject of many books, including a seven volume dictionary published in 1889. Lexicographer Eric Partridge published several works about British slang, most notably A Dictionary of Slang and Unconventional English, revised and edited by Paul Beale.

Many of the words and phrases listed in this article are no longer in current use.

== Definitions of slang ==
Slang is the use of informal words and expressions that are not considered standard in the speaker's dialect or language. Slang is often to be found in areas of the lexicon that refer to things considered taboo (see euphemism). It is often used to identify with one's peers and, although it may be common among young people, it is used by people of all ages and social groups.

Collins English Dictionary (3rd edition) defines slang as "Vocabulary, idiom etc that is not appropriate to the standard form of a language or to formal contexts, may be restricted as to social status or distribution, and is characteristically more metaphorical and transitory than standard language".

The Oxford Dictionary of English Grammar (1994) defines it as "Words, phrases, and uses that are regarded as informal and are often restricted to special contexts or are peculiar to specific profession, classes etc".

Jonathon Green, in his 1999 book The Cassell Dictionary of Slang, defines slang as "A counter language, the language of the rebel, the outlaw, the despised and the marginal". Recognising that there are many definitions, he goes on to say, "Among the many descriptions of slang, one thing is common, it is a long way from mainstream English".

== History and dating of British slang ==
The dating of slang words and phrases is difficult due to the nature of slang. Slang, more than any other language, remains spoken and resists being recorded on paper (or for that matter any other medium). By the time slang has been written down, it has been in use some time and has, in some cases, become almost mainstream.

The first recorded uses of slang in Britain occurred in the 16th century in the plays of Thomas Dekker, Thomas Middleton and William Shakespeare. The first books containing slang also appeared around that time: Robert Copland's The hye way to the Spytlell hous was a dialogue in verse between Copland and the porter of St Bartholomew's Hospital, which included thieves' cant; and in 1566, Thomas Harman's A Caveat or Warning for Common Cursitors, vulgarly called vagabonds was published. The Caveat contained stories of vagabond life, a description of their society and techniques, a taxonomy of rogues, and a short canting dictionary which was later reproduced in other works.

In 1698 the New Dictionary of the Canting Crew by B. E. Gent was published, which additionally included some 'civilian' slang terms. It remained the predominant work of its kind for much of the 18th century, until the arrival in 1785 of The Classical Dictionary of the Vulgar Tongue by Captain Francis Grose, which ran to more than five expanded editions. Grose's book was eventually superseded by John Camden Hotten's Slang Dictionary in 1859. In 1889 two multi-volumed slang dictionaries went on sale: A Dictionary of Slang, Jargon and Cant by Albert Barrere and Charles Leland, and Slang and its Analogues by John Farmer and W. E. Henley; the latter being published in seven volumes. It was later abridged to a single volume and released in 1905 as A Dictionary of Slang and Colloquial English. This book provided the major part of Eric Partridge's Dictionary of Slang and Unconventional English (1937). It was not until the 1950s that slang began to make regular appearances in books and in the relatively new media of motion pictures and television.

== Varieties and purpose of slang ==
There are a number of different varieties of British slang, arguably the best known of which is rhyming slang. Chiefly associated with cockney speech spoken in the East End of London, words are replaced with a phrase which rhymes. For example: plates of meat for "feet", or twist and twirl for "girl". Often only the first word is used, so plates and twist by themselves become the colloquialisms for "feet" and "girl".

Thieves' cant or Rogues' cant was a secret language (a cant or cryptolect) which was formerly used by thieves, beggars and hustlers of various kinds in Great Britain and to a lesser extent in other English-speaking countries. It is commonly believed that cant was developed from Romany but the Winchester Confessions, a pamphlet published in 1616, clearly distinguishes between Gypsy and Cant words. Now mostly obsolete, it is largely relegated to the realm of literature.

Some slang was developed because of a need for secrecy, such as prison slang, derived from thieves cant and Polari, a variety used by homosexuals in Britain and the United Kingdom. Homosexuality was a crime until 1967 and Polari has a history going back at least a century. Sometimes the purpose of slang is to cause offence, insults such as wanker or gobshite (Irish slang) for example; and sometimes the purpose is to prevent it by substituting a slang word for the offensive one, berk (rhyming slang for cunt) 'berkshire hunt' for example. Sometimes a Spoonerism, is employed to make taboo speech more acceptable. For example: Cupid stunt and Betty Swallocks.

Slang is also used to create an identity or sense of belonging and a number of occupations have their own slang; most notably the armed forces, referred to as Forces or Service slang; and the construction industry. A dictionary of service slang by J. L. Hunt and A. G. Pringle was published in 1943. It was reprinted in 2008. The introduction acknowledges that slang is an ever-changing language with new slang terms emerging all the time. It also recognises that some service slang has made its way into civilian use. Examples of this include the old naval terms, "Talking bilge" (nonsense) and "A loose cannon" (an unorthodox person with the potential to cause harm).

== Phrases ==
=== A ===
all to cock
(Or fall a-cock) Unsatisfactory, mixed up.
all mouth and (no) trousers
All talk and no action, a braggart, sexual bravado. (The inclusion or otherwise of "no" in the expression is disputed.)
all piss and wind
All talk and no action. Originally the phrase was, "all wind and piss" (19th century).
all tits and teeth
a derogatory description for a woman who succeeds by using her physical attributes rather than her brain; an attractive but shallow, cynically manipulative, or even stupid woman.
anchors
motor car brakes; "slam on the anchors" to brake really hard.
argy-bargy
An argument or confrontation.
arse
1. The buttocks. 2. Someone who acts in a manner which is incompetent or otherwise disapproved of.
arse about face
Back to front.
arse around
Mess around or waste time (17th century).
arsehole
General derogatory term.
arse bandit
homosexual (offensive, derogatory).
arse over tit
Head over heels, to fall over or take a tumble.

=== B ===
ball bag
Scrotum.
balls up
A bungled or messed up situation. (WWI Service slang).
bang to rights
Caught in the act.
bang up
1. To lock up in prison (prison slang). 2. To inject an illegal drug.
barking mad
(also just barking) completely crazy; insane.
barmy
crazy or foolish.
barney
a noisy quarrel or fight. Sometimes claimed to be rhyming slang (Barney Rubble, trouble) but actually dates back to 19th century.
bender
1. a drinking binge. 2. A homosexual (derogatory)
bent
1. dishonest or corrupt, 2. homosexual (mildly derogatory).
bent as a nine bob note
Extremely dishonest or corrupt. No nine shilling ("bob") note was ever issued, so it would have to be counterfeit.
berk
(also spelt burk) idiot, stupid person (from Berkeley Hunt, Cockney rhyming slang for cunt)
bezzie, bezzie mate
best friend
Billy
1. Amphetamines (from Billy Whizz, a British comic strip character.) 2. Friendless (Billy No-Mates)
billyo
(also spelt billyoh) an intensifier. Going like billyo (travelling quickly).
bird
1. Girl, woman. 2. Prison sentence (From the rhyming slang: Bird lime)
Birmingham screwdriver
A hammer.
bizzie
Policeman (Scouse).
blag
As a noun, a robbery or as a verb, to rob or scrounge. Not to be confused with blague, talking nonsense.
blah
(or blah blah) worthless, boring or silly talk.
Blighty
(or Old Blighty) Britain, home. Used especially by British troops serving abroad or expatriates. A relic of British India, probably from the Hindi billayati, meaning a foreign land.
blim
A very small piece of Hashish. Also used as slang with the word bus (Blimbus) for the shortest British coach bodies of the 1960s to 1980s.
blimey
or sometimes 'cor blimey' (archaic). An abbreviation of 'God blind me' used as an interjection to express shock or surprise. Sometimes used to comic effect, in a deliberate reference to it being archaic usage.
bloke
any man or sometimes a man in authority such as the boss.
blooming, blummin'
euphemism for bloody. Used as an intensifier e.g. 'blooming marvelous'.
blow off
To fart.
blue
1. Policeman. 2. a Tory.
bobby
Policeman. After Robert Peel (Home Secretary in 1828).
bod
A male person. Short for body.
bodge
(also botch) To make a mess of or to fix poorly.
bog
Toilet
bog off
Go away (originally RAF slang)
bog roll
Toilet paper.
Bogtrotter
Derogatory term for an Irishman, particularly an Irish peasant.
bollocking
A severe telling off.
bollocks
(or ballocks) Vulgar term used for testicles. Used to describe something as useless, nonsense or having poor quality, as in "That's a load of bollocks". Is often said as a cry of frustration or annoyance. Also see "dog's bollocks".
bomb
A large sum of money as in 'to make a bomb'. Also 'to go like a bomb' meaning to travel at high speed.
bonce
Head, crown of the head. Also a large playing marble.
booze
As a noun, an alcoholic drink; as a verb, to drink alcohol, particularly to excess.
boozer
1. a pub or bar. 2. Someone who drinks alcohol to excess.
Bo-Peep
Sleep (rhyming slang).
boracic/brassic
without money. From rhyming slang boracic lint = skint (skinned).
bottle
1. nerve, courage. 2. Money collected by buskers or street vendors. 3. As a verb, to attack someone with a broken bottle.
bounce
1. To con someone into believing or doing something. 2. To forcibly eject someone. 3. Swagger, impudence or cockiness. 4. Of a cheque, to be refused by the bank due to lack of funds.
bouncer
Someone employed to eject troublemakers or drunks.
bovver boy
A youth who deliberately causes or seeks out trouble (bother).
bovver boots
Heavy boots, sometimes with a steel toecap, worn by bovver boys and used for kicking in fights.
brass
1. Money. 2. Cheek, nerve. 3. a prostitute.
Bristols
The female breasts (Cockney rhyming slang, from Bristol bits = tits, or Bristol City = titty).
broke
Without money. Also 'stoney broke', or just 'stoney'.
brown bread
Dead (Cockney rhyming slang).
brown-tongue
Sycophant, toady or someone who attempts to curry favour with another (from the idea of licking another's backside).
buff
1. Bare skin, naked as in 'in the buff'. 2. Having a lean, muscular physique (usually referring to a young man).
bugger
anal sex but in slang terms can be used : 1. As a term of abuse for someone or something contemptible, difficult or unpleasant. 2. Affectionately, as in 'you silly bugger'. 3. As an exclamation of dissatisfaction, annoyance or surprise. 4. To mean tired or worn out as in 'I'm absolutely buggered'. 5. To mean frustrate, complicate or ruin completely, as in 'You've buggered that up'.
bugger about (or around)
1. To fool around or waste time. 2. To create difficulties or complications.
bugger all
nothing.
bugger off
go away.
bum
buttocks, anus or both. Not particularly rude. 'Builders' bum' is the exposure of the buttock cleavage by an overweight working man in ill-fitting trousers.
bumf
derogatory reference to official memos or paperwork. Shortened from bum fodder. Slang term for toilet roll.
bumsucker
a toady, creep or someone acting in an obsequious manner.
bumfreezer
any short jacket, but in particular an Eton jacket.
bung
1. a gratuity or more often a bribe. 2. Throw or pass energetically; as in, "bung it over here".
bunk
1. To leave inappropriately as in to 'bunk off' school or work. 2. To run away in suspicious circumstances as in to 'do a bunk'.
butcher's
Look. Rhyming slang, butcher's hook.

=== C ===
cabbage
1. A stupid person or someone with no mental abilities whatever. 2. Cloth trimmed from a customer's material by a tailor. 3. Pilfer or steal.
cattled
1.innebriated
charver or charva
1. Sexual intercourse (Polari). 2. A loose woman, someone with whom it is easy to have sexual intercourse, an easy lay. 3. To mess up, spoil or ruin(from 1.).
chav, chavi or chavvy
Child (from the Romany, chavi. Still in common use in rural areas). Also used in Polari since mid-19th century.
chav
Someone who is, or pretends to be, of a low social standing and who dresses in a certain style, typically in "knock off" sports and designer clothing, especially Burberry. Often used as a form of derogation. Popularised by British tabloids during the 00s using the backronym 'Council-Housed and Violent': actually comes from the Romany for child, 'chavi'.
cheers
a sign of appreciation or acknowledgement, or a drinking toast.
cheesed off
fed up, disgusted or angry.
chinky, chink, or chinky chonky
1. Chinese takeaway, usually considered offensive 2. Chinese person (derogatory)
chinwag
A friendly conversation.
chippy
1. A carpenter; chip shop 2. A prostitute or promiscuous young woman.
chuff
The buttocks or anus.
chuffed
to be very pleased about something.
clever dick, clever clogs
Someone who is annoyingly or ostentatiously clever.
clock
1. The face. 2. To spot, notice. 3. To hit as in "clock round the earhole".
cock
1. Penis. 2. Nonsense. 3. A friend or fellow.
cock-up
as a noun or verb, blunder, mess up or botch.
codswallop
Nonsense.
collywobbles
An upset stomach or acute feeling of nervousness.
conk
The head or the nose. To strike the head or nose.
cop
1. A policeman (short for copper). 2. An arrest or to be caught out, as in 'It's a fair cop'. 3. Used with a negative to mean of little value, as in 'That's not much cop'. 4. To get, as in for example, to 'cop off with', 'cop a feel' or 'cop a load of that'.
copper
A policeman.
cor blimey
An exclamation of surprise. Originally from "God blind me". See also "blimey".
corker
Someone or something outstanding.
corking
Outstanding, excellent.
cottage
A public lavatory.
cottaging
Homosexual activity in a public lavatory.
crack
1. A gibe. 2. Someone who excels at something. 3. Fun or a good time. From the Irish 'craic'.
cracker
Something or someone of notable ability or quality.
crackers
Insane.

=== D ===
darbies
Handcuffs.
debag
To remove someone's trousers by force.
dekko
Look. From the Hindi, dekho.
dick
1. Fellow. 2. Penis.
dicks
Headlice or nits. "Here comes the dick nurse" "You mean Nitty Nora, the head explorer"
dip
a pickpocket.
div
idiot (prison slang) From "The Divisional room" where extra reading was taught in the northern comprehensive schools during the 1970s and 1980s.
do one's nut
Become enraged.
doddle
Something simple or easy to accomplish.
dodgy
1. Something risky, difficult or dangerous. A 'dodgy deal' for example. 2. Of low quality. "Spurs' dodgy defence had thrown away a 2–0 lead"
dog
1. A rough or unattractive woman. 2. A fellow.
dog's bollocks
1. Anything obvious ("Sticks out like the dog's bollocks"). 2. Something especially good or first rate ("It's the dog's bollocks", sometimes abbreviated to, "it's the dog's").
Donkey's years
(Donkey's ears) a very long time. In reference to the length of a donkey's ears. Sometimes abbreviated to, "donkey's".
Done up like a kipper
1. Beaten up. 2. Fitted up or framed. 3. Caught red-handed by the police.
doofer
An unnamed object.
dosser
Someone who might stay in a dosshouse.
dosshouse
A cheap boarding house frequented by tramps.
duck
A term of endearment used in the English Midlands and Yorkshire.
duff
1. broken, not working. 2. To beat, as in 'duff up'. 3. Pregnant (up the duff).

=== E ===
earwig
1. To eavesdrop. 2. To twig (rhyming slang)
eating irons
Cutlery.
end away
to have sex (get one's end away).

=== F ===
fag
cigarette.
fag end
the used stub of a cigarette and by extension the unpleasant and worthless loose end of any situation.
fag packet
cigarette pack
fanny
female external genitalia, a woman's pudendum.
fanny adams
(Usually preceded by 'sweet' and often abbreviated to F.A., S.F.A. or sweet F.A.) Nothing at all. A euphemism for fuck all.
fence
Someone who deals in stolen property.
fit
sexually attractive (Afro-Caribbean).
fit up
A frame up.
fiver
five pounds.
filth (the)
The police (derogatory).
flasher
Someone who indecently exposes oneself.
flick
Motion picture, film. 'The flicks', the cinema.
flog
Sell.
flog a dead horse
1. To continue talking about a long forgotten topic. 2. To attempt to find a solution to a problem which is unsolvable.
flutter
(To have a flutter) To place a wager.
fly
Quick witted, clever.
fork out
To pay out, usually with some reluctance.
French letter
Condom.
frig
1.(Taboo) To masturbate. 2. When followed by 'around' or 'about', to behave aimlessly or foolishly.
frigging
1. The act of masturbating. 2. Used as an intensifier. For example, "You frigging idiot". Considered milder than 'fucking'.
Frog
Derogatory term for a Frenchman.
Frogs Knob
Brasside slang for a pickle.
fuck all
nothing at all
fudge packer
homosexual. (mildly derogatory)
fuzz (the)
The police.

=== G ===
gaff
House or flat.
gaffer
Boss, foreman or employer.
gander
Usually preceded by 'have a' or 'take a'. To look.
gash
1. Surplus to requirements, unnecessary. 2. Derogatory term used for female genitalia.
gassed
1. Drunk. 2. excited
geezer
(informal) Man. Particularly an old one.
get
Variant of git. Insulting suggestion; one born through incest – 'Begotten-beget. "Son of your uncle".
git
incompetent, stupid, annoying, or childish person.
go down
1. To go to prison. 2. oral sex as in "did you go down on her?"
go spare
To become angry, frustrated, distressed, enraged.
gob
1. Mouth 2. To spit. 3. Spittle.
gobshite
(Taboo) A stupid or despicable person.
gobsmacked
flabbergasted, dumbfounded, astounded, speechless. Possibly either from the gesture of clapping one's hand over one's mouth in surprise, or the idea that something is as shocking as being smacked in the mouth
gogglebox
Television.
gong
A medal. Usually a military one.
goolies
testicles
grass
originally London (rhyming) slang for informer.
grand
£1000
grot
Rubbish or dirt. hence also porn as in "grot-mags"
gubbins
General stuff; the guts of electrical equipment
guff
1. Ridiculous talk. Nonsense. 2. Flatulence. Probably from the Norwegian gufs, a puff of wind.

=== H ===
half-inch
to steal (rhyming slang for 'pinch')
hampton
Penis (rhyming slang from, Hampton Wick = prick; and Hampton Rock = cock).
handbags
a harmless fight especially between two women. (from "handbags at dawn" an allusion to duelling)
hard cheese/hard lines
Bad luck.
hardman or hard man
A man who is ruthless and/or violent.
helmet
The glans of the penis.
henry
A henry is (or was) an eighth of an ounce (as in Henry the 8th) = in weight to a decimal penny
honk
Vomit.
hook it
To run away quickly.
hooky or hookey
1. Something that is stolen (probably from hook = to steal). 2. Anything illegal.
hooter
Nose.
hump
1. To carry or heave.

=== I ===
idiot box
Television.

inside
In or into prison.

ivories
1. Teeth. 2. The keys of a piano. 3. Dice.

I'm all right, Jack
A remark, often directed at another, indicating that they are selfish and that they don't care about it.

=== J ===
jacksy (or jacksie)
The buttocks or anus.
Jack the lad
A young man who is regarded as a show off and is brash or loud.
jack up
Inject an illegal drug.
jag
1. A drug taking, or sometimes drinking, binge. 2. A period of uncontrolled activity.
jammy
1. Lucky. 2. Pleasant or desirable. as in "More jam than Hartley's" when an impressive pool shot is pulled off.
jerry
A chamber pot.
Jerry
A German or German soldier.
jessie
An effeminate man or one that is weak or afraid. (Originally Scottish slang)
jism, jissom, jizz
semen.
Jock
word or term of address for a Scot.
Joe Bloggs
A man who is average, typical or unremarkable.
Joe Soap
An idiot, stooge or scapegoat.
Johnny
Condom. Sometimes also a 'Johnny bag' or 'rubber Johnny'.
John Thomas
Penis.
josser
A cretin or simpleton.
judy
A girl or woman.
jump
As a noun or verb, sexual intercourse.

=== K ===
kip
1. Sleep, nap 2. Bed or lodging 3. Brothel (mainly Irish)
knackered
1. Exhausted, tired, 2. Broken, beyond all usefulness.
knackers
vulgar name for testicles.
knees-up
A lively party or dance.
knob
1. Penis. 2. (of a man) To have sexual intercourse.
knobhead
a stupid, irritating person.
knob jockey
homosexual (to ride the penis like a jockey rides a horse).
knob-end
an idiot, or tip of penis (see bell-end).
knockers
Breasts.
knocking shop
Brothel.
know one's onions
To be well acquainted with a subject.

=== L ===
lady
A five-pound note. Rhyming Slang, Lady Godiva-Fiver
lag
1. Convict, particularly a long serving one (an old lag).
lash
1. Urinate. 2. Alcohol.
lashed
very inebriated. Also 'on the lash' meaning to go out drinking with the intent of getting drunk.
laughing gear
Mouth.
louie
A louie is (or was) a sixteenth of an ounce (as in Louie the 16th) = in weight to a decimal halfpence
local
A public house close to one's home.
lolly
money.
loo
lavatory.

=== M ===
manky
dirty, filthy. (Polari).
Manky Snatcher
Maggie Thatcher
marbles
Wits. As in, to lose one's marbles.
mardy
A dejected or mopey state. Widely used in the North and Midlands of England.
mare
Woman (derogatory).
mark
A suitable victim for a con or swindle.
matelot
Sailor (from the French).
meat and two veg
Literally a traditional meal consisting of any meat, potatoes and a second type of vegetable; euphemistically the male external genitalia. Is sometimes also used to mean something unremarkable or ordinary.
mental
Crazy or insane.
Mick
An Irishman (derogatory).
miffed
Upset or offended.
milk run
A 'safe' mission or patrol.
minge
Vagina
minger
Someone who smells.
minted
Wealthy.
mither
1. to complain. 2. to annoy or bother. Used in Northern England.
mizzle
Decamp.
moggy
Cat.
moke
Donkey.
monged (out)
Severely drunk/high. Derogatory use of archaic phrase for Down syndrome.
moniker or moniker
Name, nickname, signature or mark.
monkey
£500.from the 500 Rupiah note from British soldiers stationed in India. The 500 Rupee bank note has a picture of a monkey on it.
mooch
Loiter or wander aimlessly, skulk.
moody gear, or story
stolen property or an improbable tale.
moolah
Money.
moon
To expose one's backside (from Old English, mona).
moony
Crazy or foolish.
muck about
Waste time. Interfere with.
mucker
Mate, pal. Romanichal
muck in
Share a duty or workload.
mufti
Civilian dress worn by someone who normally wears a military uniform. Probably from the Muslim dress, popularly worn by British officers serving in India during the 19th century. Now commonly used to refer to a non-uniform day in schools.
mug
1. Face. 2. A gullible or easily swindled person.
mug off
Sell Short, Underestimate, Insult as in "Is he mugging me off?"
munter
Ugly person.
mush
1. Face or mouth. 2. Familiar term of address. Probably from the Romanichal moosh, a man.

Mopped
Mopped can be used to describe anything for example

“He was mopped in that football game” or “he was mopped at dancing”

It can be a positive of a negative.

=== N ===
nab

To grab or steal something, similar to nick.

naff
Inferior or in poor taste. Also used as a minced oath as in, for example, "Naff off!" The latter usage was popularised by Ronnie Barker in the 1970s TV sitcom Porridge.
nark
1. As a verb or noun; spy or informer. from "Narcotics" as in the "drug squad", or from Romany nāk = "nose" 2. Someone who complains a lot (an old nark). 3. Annoy or irritate.
neck
1. Kiss (they were both caught necking) 2. Involved heavily in something (he's up to his neck in it).
ned
(Scottish) a lout, a drunken brawling fellow, a tough. Often said to stand for Non-Educated Delinquent but this is a backronym. More likely to come from Teddy Boys being a contraction of Edward. More recently, sometimes equated with the English chav.
nick
1. Steal. 2. Police Station or prison. 3. To arrest. 4. health or condition, "to be in good nick"
nicked
Arrested or stolen.
nicker
Pound sterling.
noggin
a lump of Hashish, bigger than a blim but less than a louie
nob
1. Person of high social standing. 2. Head.
nobble
Disable (particularly a racehorse).
nod out
To lapse into a drug induced stupour.
nonce
Sex offender, most commonly a child molester. (Prison slang)
noodle
Brain. as in "Use your noodle for once".
nordle
Hashish codeword, now a type weed with lower THC and higher CBD
nookie or nooky
Sexual intercourse.
nose rag
Handkerchief.
nosh
1. Food. 2. To eat. 3. Oral sex.
nosh up
A feast or large, satisfying meal.
nowt
Nothing. Used in Northern England.
nugget
A pound coin, as in golden nugget.
numpty
Incompetent or unwise person.
nut
1. Head. 2. Eccentric person.
nutcase
An insane person.
nuthouse
A lunatic asylum.
nutmeg
In association football, to pass the ball between an opposing player's legs.
nuts or nutty
Crazy or insane.
nutter
Insane person.

=== O ===
odds and sods
Substitute for 'odds and ends'. Miscellaneous items or articles, bits and pieces.
oik
Someone of a low social standing (derogatory).
off one's head (or out of one's head)
Mad or delirious.
off the hook
Free from obligation or danger.
off one's nut
Crazy or foolish.
old bill, the old bill
A policeman or the police collectively.
one and you're anyone's, two and you're everyone's
A term referring to service men returning from duty, and not being used to alcohol. In the traditional music/dance halls it was said "one drink and they would dance with anyone & two drinks and they would dance with everyone "
one's head off
Loud or excessively. "I laughed my head off" or "She screamed her head off" for example.
out to lunch
To doze off drunk or high and neglect a responsibility. also "Lunch Out"
owt
Anything. Used in Northern England. Derived from aught.

=== P ===
packet
1. A large sum of money (earn a packet). 2. A nasty surprise (catch a packet).
paddy
a fit of temper.
Paddy
(capitalised) An Irishman (derogatory).
pants
Rubbish; something worthless.
paste
To hit, punch or beat soundly. From a 19th-century variant of baste, meaning to beat thoroughly.
pasting
A sound thrashing or heavy defeat.
pegged
To die [ie he pegged it last week] Thought to have originated from soldiers in the First World War playing the card game cribbage. Scores in cribbage are kept on a peg board and the losing player is said to 'peg out'.
penny-dreadful
A cheap, sensationalist magazine.
phiz or phizog
The face (from a 17th-century colloquial shortening of physiognomy).
pickled
Drunk.
pie-eyed
Drunk.
pig's ear
1. Beer (Cockney rhyming slang. 2. Something that has been badly done or has been made a mess of.
pikey
Pejorative term used, mainly in England to refer to travellers, gypsies or vagrants. Sometimes also used to describe people of low social class or morals. Someone less than quarter blood Romani who travels, but may have less inclination to keep to the old ways (from Lancs Romanichal oral tradition)
pillock
Stupid or annoying person.
pinch
1. (noun) A robbery. 2. Sail too close to the wind (nautical slang).
pissed, pissed up
Drunk.
pisshead
a heavy drinker, alcoholic
on the piss
Getting drunk, drinking alcohol.
piss in (someone's) chips
dash someone's hopes or plans
plastered
Extremely drunk.
play silly buggers
To behave in a silly, stupid or annoying way.
plonker
1. Something large or substantial (mid-19th century). 2. Penis. 3. A general term of abuse (from 2.; in use since 1960s but may have been popularised by the BBC comedy series Only Fools and Horses.)
ponce
1. Homosexual 2. To borrow from someone (derogatory sense)
pongo
a British Army soldier (used especially by members of the Royal Navy or RAF)
pony
£25 (18th century).
poof, poofta
homosexual (mildly derogatory)
porkies
Lies (from the cockney rhyming slang pork pies)
porridge
(To do porridge) A term in prison.
powder nose
as in 'I'm just going to powder my nose' : going to the toilet (derived from powder room).
prat
a fool
punt
1. To gamble, wager or take a chance. 2. To sell or promote.
punter
1. Customer, patron. 2. Gambler (one who takes a punt). 3. A victim in a confidence trick or swindle.

=== Q ===
queer as folk
1. A drama concerning the life of three homosexual men in Manchester England. 2. A way of saying "people are strange" usually preceded by the words "nowt as". Primarily used in the North of England.
queer as a clockwork orange
1. Very odd indeed. 2. Ostentatiously homosexual.
Queer Street
A difficult or odd situation (up Queer Street).
queer someone's pitch
1. Take the pitch of another street vendor, busker or similar. 2. Spoil someone else's efforts.
quid
Pound sterling
quim
Vagina (possibly a play on the Welsh word for valley, cwm).

=== R ===
rat-arsed
extremely drunk

Richard the Third
A piece of excrement (rhyming slang Richard the Third = turd).

ring
Anal sphincter

ringburner
1. A curry. 2. Diarrhoea or painful defecation.

rozzer
Policeman. from "Rosicrucian"

rumpy pumpy
sexual intercourse, used jokingly. (Popularised by its usage in The Black Adder and subsequent series; the suggestion of actor Alex Norton of a Scots term.)

=== S ===
safe
An all purpose term of approval. Popularised during the early rave era 1988–1995.
savvy
Knowledge, understanding (from the French, savoir).
scally
A hooligan youth (Scouse), short for scallywag.
scarper
Run away. Sometimes claimed to be rhyming slang: Scapa Flow (go).

screw
to have sex, or a prison guard
scrubber
In Britain, a promiscuous woman; in Ireland, a common or working class woman.
Scouser
Someone from Liverpool.
scrote
Term of abuse, from scrotum.
scrounger
A lazy person who typically lives on benefits.
see a man about a dog
1. Attend a secret deal or meeting. 2. Go to the toilet.
shag
Sexual intercourse.
shagged
1. The past historic of shag. 2. Extremely tired (shagged out).
shiner
Black eye.
shitehawk
Someone of little worth, originally military slang.
shit-faced
Drunk.
shop
betray, tell on someone [the criminal was shopped to the police by his gang]
skanky
Dirty, particularly of a marijuana pipe. However originally Jamaican Patois for lazy dancing or "The Rasta Swagger" as in Easy Skanking
skint
Without money.
slag
1. Worthless or insignificant person. 2. Promiscuous woman or prostitute.
slag off
A verbal attack. To criticise or slander.
slap-head
A bald man.
slapper
Promiscuous woman or prostitute.
slash
Urinate, urination.
sling one's hook
Go away.
snog
French kiss, or any prolonged physical intimacy without undressing or sexual contact.
soccer
Abbreviation of association football. Originally British, the term is now more commonly used in the United States where "football" is primarily used to refer to American football.
sod
Annoying person or thing (from sodomite).
sod off
"Go away".
spawny
Lucky (possibly from the Scottish game, Spawnie).
specks
Glasses
specky
Refers to someone with glasses (derogatory)
splud
archaic slang – short for "God's Blood". It was used as a mild curse word. It was used to replace other words seen as blasephmy.
spunk
1. Semen, ejaculate. 2. Courage, bravery.
steaming
1. Extremely drunk. 2. An intensifier, e.g. "You steaming gurt ninny!" 3. Extremely angry.
stuffed
1. Sexual intercourse (e.g. "get stuffed") 2. Used negatively to mean bothered, as in, "I can't be stuffed to do that!". 3. having a full belly (e.g. "I am completely stuffed, and can't eat another thing.").

=== T ===
tab
cigarette
tad
a little bit
take the piss (out of)
To mock.
take the mickey
To tease or mock.
tart
Commonly a prostitute or term of abuse but also used affectionately for a lover. Shortened version of sweetheart.
tenner
Ten pounds.
toff
Posh person
tommy
A British soldier in WWI.
ton
1. A large unspecified amount (18th century). 2. £100 (1940s). 3. 100 MPH (1950s). 4. Any unit of 100 (1960s).
tosh
Nonsense
tosser
1. Someone who masturbates (to toss off). 2. Someone the speaker doesn't like (from 1.). 3. An affectionate form of address (from 1.) e.g. "All right you old tosser!"
tosspot
Drunkard or habitual drinker (from tossing pots of ale)
tube
1. The London Underground (19th century. Originally 'Tuppeny tube'). 2. Penis. 3. A person (Scottish). 4. A general term of contempt (Irish, 1950s).
twag
bunk off school, play truant. "You off to twag maths" Lincolnshire, Yorkshire probably from "to wag"
twat
1. Vagina. 2. Term of abuse (from 1.). 3. To hit hard.

=== W ===
waffle
fail to make up ones mind.
wag off
Skyve or play truant.
wank
1. Masturbation or to masturbate. 2. Inferior.
wanker
1. Someone who masturbates. 2. Abusive term (from 1.), someone the speaker doesn't like.
wankered
1. Very drunk. 2. Exhausted.
wanking spanner(s)
Hand(s).
warts and all
Including all negative characteristics (from a reported request from Oliver Cromwell to Peter Lely)
whizz
1. Urination. 2. Amphetamine Sulphate (also known as speed; from whizz, to move very fast).
willy
Penis (hypocorism).
willy-waving
Acting in an excessively macho fashion.
wind up
to tease, irritate, annoy, anger

=== Y ===
Yookay
respelling of "UK" (first coined by Raymond Williams, later recoined by X user @kunley_drukpa); used to insinuate that multicultural British society of the 21st century is fundamentally different to British society of the past. The term is for the most part pejorative. Other critics have criticised as racist.

== See also ==
- British English
- London slang
- Roger's Profanisaurus
- Welsh slang
