= Georgian profanity =

Profanity in the Georgian language

Georgian profanity (Georgian: ქართული ბილწსიტყვაობა, romanized: kartuli bilts'sit'q'vaoba) (Note: The name is derived from Old Georgian meaning "filth".) refers to inflammatory vulgar, obscene or profane language in Georgian and a specialized, extreme subset of Georgian slang.

The Georgian Orthodox Church have traditionally been very critical of Georgian profanity, describing it as "words of death and Satan", that will result in "severe punishment by God". (Note: After the Orthodox Christmas of 2019, then-Chairperson of the Parliament of Georgia Irakli Kobakhidze suggested to make Georgian profanity punishable and forbidden by law, but then-Minister of Justice of Georgia Thea Tsulukiani ruled out such a scenario saying "that very law will put us all in prison, so it should stay protected by the freedom of expression".) According to The Georgian Chronicles, King David IV "the Builder" during his reign "destroyed" all the moral and verbal "irregularities" like the "satanic songs, acting, pleasure and profanity".

== Phrases ==
For exact and comprehensive pronunciation of words and phrases, especially ones written with the apostrophes, the rules of romanization of Georgian and IPA are essential.

=== A ===
ატეხილი
at'ekhili - horny. Literally meaning "unchained". Used only for describing women.
ახურებული
akhurebuli - horny. Literally meaning "one in heat". Used for describing men.

=== B ===
ბოზი
bozi - slut, whore.

ბოზიქალი : bozikali - slut, whore.
ბოზური : bozuri - whorish.
ბოზიიიშ! : boziiish! - holy fuck!
ბოზიშვილი : bozishvili - a despicable person. Literally "son of a slut".
ბოზანდარა : bozandara - a despicable person.
ნაბოზარი : nabozari - a despicable person. Literally "one that used to be a slut".

=== Ch ===
ჩათლახი
chatlakhi - worthless person; whore, slut.

=== Ch' ===
ჭუჭუ
ch'uch'u - little dick.

=== Dz ===
ძაღლობა
dzaghloba - cops; vile actions. The term literally means "dogs".

ძაღლიშვილი : dzaghlishvili - a despicable person. Literally "son of a dog".
ძაღლური : dzaghluri - vile, inhumane.
მშობელძაღლო! : mshobeldzaghlo! - Literally meaning "your parents are dogs" is used to describe a despicable person.
მამაძაღლო! : mamadzaghlo! - Literally meaning "your father is a dog" is used to describe a despicable person.
მკვდარძაღლო! : mk'vdardzaghlo! - Literally meaning "you are a dead dog" is used to describe a despicable person.
პირძაღლო! : p'irdzaghlo! - Literally meaning "you are a mouth of a dog" is used to describe a despicable person.
რჯულძაღლო! : rjuldzaghlo! - Literally meaning "you are a faith of a dog" is used to describe a despicable person.
სულძაღლო! : suldzaghlo! - Literally meaning "you are a soul of a dog" is used to describe a despicable person.
ჩაძაღლებული : chadzaghlebuli - killed; dead.

ძუკნა
dzuk'na - bitch.
ძუძუ
dzudzu - tits, breast.

=== G ===
გათავება
gataveba - to come, ejaculate. Literally means "finish".

ვათავებ! : vataveb! - I'm coming! I'm about to ejaculate!
გავუთავე : gavutave - I ejaculated on her/him!

გათხრა
gatkhra - to fuck, to stick in. Literally "to dig".

შენ დედას გავთხარე! : shen dedas gavtkhare! - I fucked your mother!
გაითხარე ტრაკში! : gaitkhare t'rak'shi! - Keep it (to stingy person)! Literally meaning stick it in your ass.

=== Gh ===
ღმერთმა დაგწყევლოს!
ghmertma dagts'q'evlos! - God damn you!
ღორიშვილი
ghorishvili - a despicable person. Literally "son of a pig".

ღორი : ghori - greedy person. Literally "pig".
ღრუსი : ghrusi - derogatory way of referring to Russians. Literally meaning "Russian pig".
ღრუსეთი : ghruseti - derogatory way of referring to Russia. Literally meaning "country of Russian pig".

=== I ===
იჯვამს
ijvams - one that shits himself.

ჩაჯმული : chajmuli - a person who is easily frightened or intimidated.
გააჯვი! : gaajvi! - fuck off! Literally meaning "shit off".
ჩააჯვა კამპოტში! : chaajva k'ampotshi - fuck up, spoil the party. The term literally means to "shit in the Kompot".
ჩაგაჯვი პირში! : chagajvi p'irshi! - I shit in your mouth!

იფსამს
ipsams - one that pisses himself.

ჩაფსმული : chapsmuli - a person who is easily frightened and intimidated.

=== J ===
ჯიქანი
jikani - tits. (used in more rural areas).

=== K' ===
კახპა
k'akhp'a - whore; slut.
კუილი
k'uili - fart.

კუილივით გაიპარა : k'uilivit gaip'ara - means "one that ran away cowardly". Literally "sneak out like a fart".
კუანა : k'uana - a coward. Literally "someone who farts".

კუტუ
k'ut'u - little dick.

=== M ===
მინეტი
minet'i - blowjob. The term is derived from French minette.
მძღნერი
mdzghneri - shit.
მუტელი
mut'eli - cunt, pussy.

აუ რა მუტელია! : au ra mut'elia! - expressing admiration when seeing extremely beautiful and sexually attractive woman. Literally "wow, what a pussy!".
მუტლისმწოველი : mut'lismts'oveli - a person who performs cunnilingus. Literally "one who sucks the pussy".
გაგმუტლავ! : gagmut'lav! - I will beat the shit out of you! Literally "I'll turn you into a pussy".

მწოველი
mts'oveli - sucker; performing cunnilingus.

=== N ===
ნაბიჭვარი
nabich'vari - bastard.
ნაწყლი
nats'q'li - asshole.
ნძრევა
ndzreva - jerking off, masturbation. Literally meaning "to shake".

მძრეველა : mdzrevela - a fapper.
შენძრეული : shendzreuli - sly person.
შე ჰო არ ანძრევ? : she ho ar andzrev? - Are you out of your fucking mind? Literally "are you jerking off?"
დაენძრა : daendzra - Used to describe a situation when a person is in danger or should expect trouble to happen soon.

=== P ===
ფათახი
patakhi - cunt.
ფისო
piso - pussy.
ფუჩუ
puchu - cunt, pussy of a young girl.
ფუჩური
puchuri - cunt, pussy of a young girl.

=== P' ===
პიდარასტი
p'idarast'i - faggot.
პირში აღება
p'irshi agheba - a blowjob. Literally meaning "taking it in the mouth".
პროჭი
p'roch'i - asshole.

პროჭული : p'roch'uli - fucking awful; horrible.
მეპროჭე : mep'roch'e - gay male.

=== Q' ===
The Georgian Mkhedruli script-written text reads, q'le (i.e. "dick") at the Trader Joe's in SoHo, Manhattan.

ყლე
q'le - dick.

ყლეო! : q'leo! - Hey you stupid! Literally "you, dick!".
ყლეთაყლე : q'letaq'le - extremely stupid person. Literally "The dickest of dicks".
ყლიშვილი : q'lishvili - stupid person. Literally "son of a dick".
ყლიფონა : q'lipona - stupid person.
ყლინჯი : q'linji - stupid person.
ყლისთავა : q'listava - dick-head.
ყლის ჭუჭყი : q'lis ch'uch'q'i - stupid person. Literally "penis smegma".
აყლისთავდა : aq'listavda - describes a moment when a person falls. Literally "one that became a dick-head".
დამახტი ყლეზე! : damakht'i q'leze - I can’t be fucking bothered!; who gives a fuck! The term literally means "jump on my dick".
ჩემს ყლეს! : chems q'les! - I don't give a fuck! Literally meaning "it can go to my dick!".
ყლეზე მკიდია! : q'leze mk'idia! - I don't give a fuck! Literally meaning "it hangs on my dick".
ყლეზე ბანტი! : q'leze bant'i! - I don't give a fuck! Literally meaning "ribbon on my dick".
ყლეობა : q'leoba - stupid deed, or low quality thing.
ყლექალა : q'lekala - a stupid girl, woman. Literally "dick woman".
გამოყლევებული : gamoq'levebuli - stupid person.
დაყლევებული : daq'levebuli - stupid person.
საყლევეთი : saq'leveti - land full of idiots and imbeciles. Literally "land of dicks".

ყვერი
q'veri - testicle, ball.

ყვერებში გენაცვალე! : q'verebshi genatsvale! - You've got the balls!

=== Sh ===
Under the Mkhedruli script graffiti in Tbilisi, text in black saying anton shegetsi meaning "fuck you Anton" or "I fucked you Anton".

შეცემა
shetsema - to fuck.

შენი დედას შევეცი! : sheni dedas shevetsi! - I fucked your mother!
შენი პირში შევეცი! : sheni pirshi shevetsi! - I fucked your mouth!
შეგეცი მუტელში! : shegetsi mut'elshi! - I fucked your pussy!
შეგეცი ტრაკში! : shegetsi t'rak'shi! - I fucked your ass!
შეგეცი კეთილებში! : shegetsi k'etilebshi! - Fuck your family!

შეთხრა
shetkhra - to fuck someone anally. The term literally means "dig into something".
შიგ ჰო არა გაქ?
shig ho ara gak? - Are you out of your fucking mind? Literally "do you have it inside?"

=== T ===
თესლი
tesli - sperm, seed. (Note: The name in Old Georgian meant a "nation".) Sometimes can be used as a term of admiration for a thing or a person that is beautiful, cool or extraordinary.

უთესლესი : uteslesi - Used as a term of admiration for a thing or a person that is extremely beautiful, cool or extraordinary. Also can be used to describe a sly and dangerous person.
მიათესლა : miatesla - one ejaculating on another sexual partner.
დაათესლა : daatesla - one ejaculating on another sexual partner.
ჩაათესლა : chaatesla - one ejaculating inside another sexual partner's pussy, anus or mouth.
ჩამოთესლილი : chamoteslili - derogatory description of foreigners, who visit Georgia.

=== T' ===
ტრაკი
t'rak'i - ass.

ტრაკიანი : t'rak'iani - a brave person. Literally "someone with an ass".
ტრაკული : t'rak'uli - shitty.
უტრაკო : ut'rak'o - a coward. Literally "someone without an ass".
მაკოცე ტრაკზე! : mak'otse t'rak'ze! - kiss my ass!
რა გამიტრაკე საქმე! : ra gamit'rak'e sakme! - you're such a pain in the ass!
მაზოლი მაქ ტრაკზე! : mazoli mak t'rak'ze! - I worked my ass off.
მეტრაკე : met'rak'e - gay male. Literally meaning "ass-er" i.e. someone who goes after ass.
ნუ გაატრაკე : nu gaat'rak'e - No fucking way! Literally "don't act as an ass".
სადღაც ტრაკში : sadghats t'rak'shi - somewhere very far. Literally "somewhere in the ass".

ტრაწი
t'rats'i - shit, diarrhea.

ტრაწიანი : t'rats'iani - a weak person or a coward.

ტყვნა
t'q'vna - to fuck. Words and phrases derived from it are the most used.

შენი დედა მოვტყან! : sheni deda movt'q'an! - I fucked your mother!
შენ მოგიტყან დედის მუტელი! : shen mogit'q'an dedis mut'eli! - I fucked the pussy of your mother!
შენ მოგიტყან დედის ტრაკი! : shen mogit'q'an dedis t'rak'i! - I fucked the ass of your mother!
შენი ჯიში მოვტყან! : sheni jishi movt'q'an! - I fucked your origin!
დედამოტყნული : dedamot'q'nuli - Literally "mother-fucked", that may mean a dangerous person who can do bad, harmful and unpredictable things.
დედამოტყნულისერთი : dedamot'q'nuliserti - Literally "one mother-fucked", that may mean a dangerous person who can do bad, harmful and unpredictable things.
ტყნაური : t'q'nauri - an act of fucking, sex.
მტყვნელი : mt'q'vneli - a person who fucks, a fucker. It can sometimes have a positive description for a person who is considered wealthy, cool, brave or confident.
დედისმტყვნელი : dedismt'q'vneli - a motherfucker. It can be used as a term of admiration which may describe a wealthy, cool or confident person.

=== V ===
ვირიშვილი
virishvili - a despicable person. Literally "son of a donkey".

მაიმუნო ვირიშვილო! : maimuno virishvilo! - used for criticizing youngsters for misbehavior by the elderly. Literally "you're a monkey, son of a donkey".

== Bibliography ==
- Rayfield, Donald (2006) A Comprehensive Georgian-English Dictionary, Garnet Publishing, ISBN 978-0-9535878-3-4
- Friedman, V. (1988) Elementary Georgian Obscenity. Maledicta, Vol. 10
- The Georgian Chronicles, Life of King of Kings, David, Part No. 349. TITUS (Online Version).
