= Welsh slang =

Colloquialisms in the Welsh language

Welsh slang (Welsh: bratiaith Gymraeg) is the colloquial terminology of the Welsh language, a Celtic language that is a co-official language of Wales alongside English.

The Welsh language also has a variety of profanities, many of which are derived from British English profanity.

== Phrases ==
=== B ===
biji-bo
a penis
bogal jobio
to have gay sex
bustachu
to have sexual intercourse with a woman without any danger of impregnating her (bustach means "steer", i.e a castrated bull)
bwchio
to have sex with someone, to fuck someone

=== C ===
cachgi
a coward (lit. 'dog shit')
cachiad
faeces, shit
cachu
to defecate, to shit
cachu iar
chicken shit
cachu planciau
to be terrified (lit. 'shitting planks')
cachwr
a shithead (lit. 'shitter')
calar
penis, dick, cock (derived from the Mabinogion)
cael cachiad
to defecate, to take a shit
cedor lama
a wanker (lit. 'llama's pubic hair')
cer i grafu
go to Hell, an expression (lit. 'go to scratch')
cerpyn jam
a tampon (used in Wrexham)
cig a llysiau
the male genitalia (lit. 'meat and vegetables', in reference to their shape)
cnych
fuck (noun)
cnychu
to have sex, to fuck
coc
the penis, the cock, the dick
coc oen
a dickhead (lit. 'lamb's dick')
codiad
an erection
cont
cunt (a highly profane word though sometimes used as a term of endearment, like in Australian, British, Irish and New Zealand English)
corris
cunt
crnyiadur
a coward
cwd
the scrotum, the ballsack, the nutsack (lit. 'pouch')

=== Ch ===
chwit-chwat
inconsistent (an onomatopoeia)

=== D ===
dim gwerth rhech dafad
worthless (lit. 'not worth a sheep's fart')
disgleirio fel ceilliau ci
for something to be excellent, the bee's knees, the dog's bollocks (lit. 'to shine like dog's testicles')
dos i chwarae efo dy nain
"go away", "fuck off" (lit. 'go play with your nan')

=== F ===
fel rhech jet
to be like a damp squib (lit. 'like a jet's fart')

=== Ff ===
ffwrch
fuck (noun)
ffwrcho
to have sex, to fuck
ffyc
fuck (expression and noun)
ffycio
to have sex, to fuck

=== G ===
Gog
a Gog, a person from North Wales

=== H ===
halliad hallt
lit. 'salty wank'

=== I ===
iawn cont
a term of endearment (used in Caernarfon)

=== J ===
jini ffernac
a tampon

=== L ===
lembo
an idiot

=== Ll ===
llawes goch
the female genitalia (lit. 'red sleeve')

=== M ===
mae hi wedi cachi arna i
"I'm buggered", "I'm for the chop" (lit. 'it's shit on me')
malu cachu
talking nonsense, talking shit (lit. 'mincing shit')
mewn cachiad
to do something very quickly (lit. 'en' or 'in a shit')
mewn cachiad chwanan
to do something very quickly (lit. 'in a flea's shit')
mewn cachiad nico
to do something quickly (lit. 'in a goldfinch's shit')
mewn dau gachiad
to do something quickly (lit. 'in two shits')
min dwr
a penis that is erect whilst the man is drunk (lit. 'watery hard-on/boner')
mwg drwg
marijuana, cannabis (lit. 'bad smoke')
mwrddrwg
a cheeky monkey (lit. 'great evil')

=== P ===
paid â chodi pas wedi pisio
"don't cry over spilt milk" (lit. 'don't lift your petticoats after pissing')
pen-coc
a dickhead, a cockhead
pidyn tarw
a dickhead (lit. 'bull's penis')
pis
urine, piss
pisio
to urinate, to piss
pisio bwrw
heavy rain (lit. 'pissing rain')
pisio cath
a white currant (lit. 'cat piss')
pisio glaw
heavy rain (lit. 'pissing rain')
piso
to urinate, to piss
piso dryw
a weak drink, e.g tea (lit. 'wren's piss')
piso dryw bach yn y môr
a drop in the ocean (lit. 'little wren's piss in the sea')
piso gwidw
a weak drink, e.g. tea (lit. 'widow's piss')
pwdin blew
the female genitalia (lit. 'hairy pudding')

=== Rh ===
rhacs jibidêrs
in smithereens (lit. 'rags in tatters')
rhech mewn potel [bop]
something insignificant, "like a fart in a jacuzzi/hothub/spa" (lit. 'like a fart in a bottle [of pop (carbonated soft drink)]'

=== S ===
sach bach
a condom (lit. 'small sack'; used in Merthyr Tydfil)
saim serch
semen, love juice (lit. 'love grease')
sgleinio fel ceilliau ci
for something to be excellent, the bee's knees, the dog's bollocks (lit. 'to shine like dog's testicles')
sguthan
a bitch, a harridan
shinach
a sly bastard
siani
the female genitalia
silffo
to get off with someone
sioncen
the vulva, the fanny
Sir Gâr
Carmarthenshire (formally Sir Gaerfyrddin)
slebog
a promiscuous woman, a slut, a slag
s'mae cwd
a greeting (used in Caernarfon)
spwng dorth
an Arctic roll (lit. 'spunk loaf')
swydd chwythiant
fellatio (a calque of the English word "blowjob")

=== T ===
tafod bach
the G-spot
twll dy din
"go away", "bugger off"
twll tin
an arsehole, an asshole

=== Y ===
Y Bermo
Barmouth (formally Abermaw)
yn twll tin Ifan saer
a sarcastic reply to "Where is it?" (lit. 'in Evan the carpenter's arse/ass')

== See also ==
- British slang, English-language slang used in the United Kingdom (including in Wales)
