= Peacocking =

Attempts by males to increase their attractiveness to a female

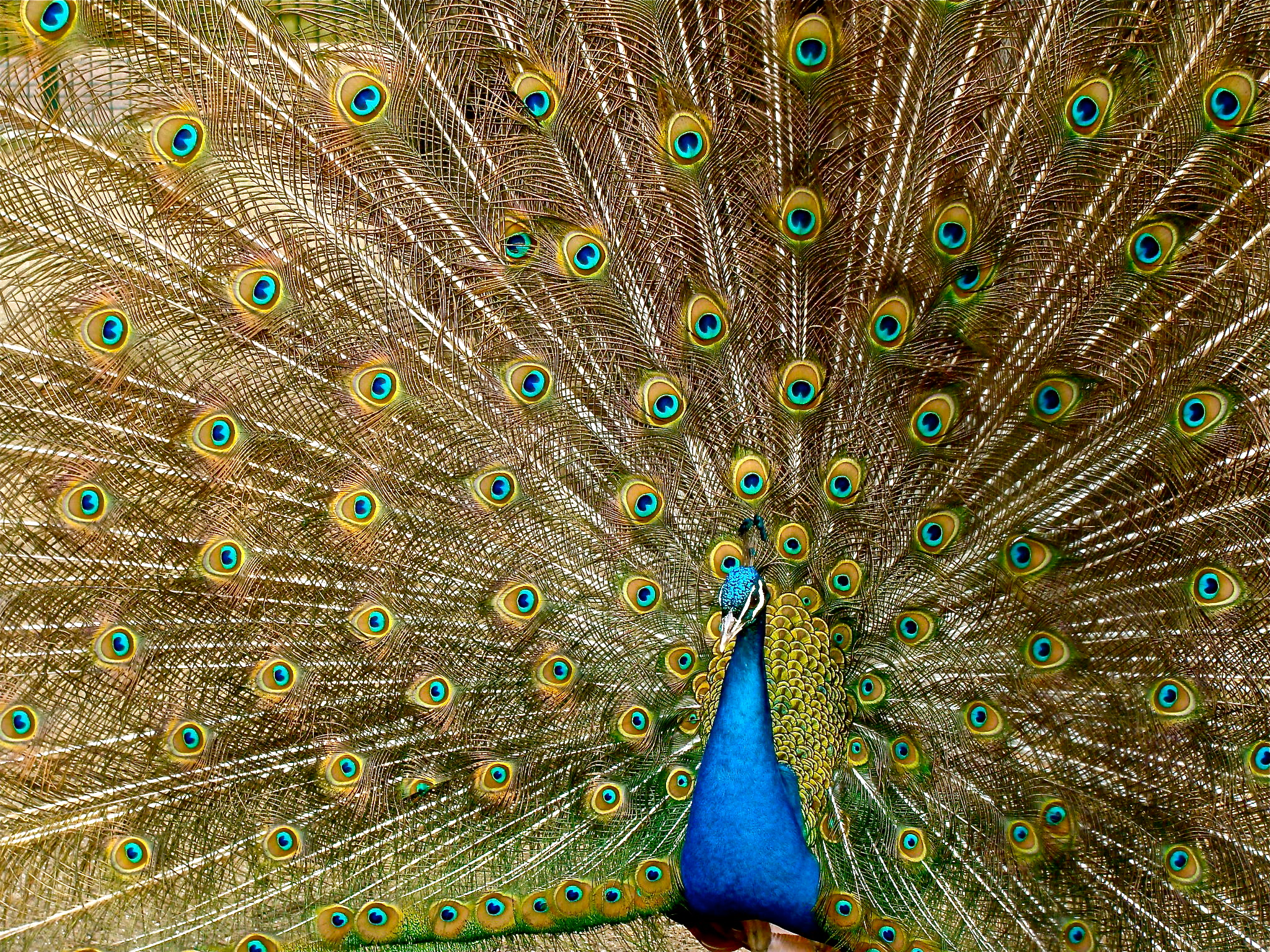
Peafowl displaying his tail

In sociology, peacocking is a social behavior in which a male uses ostentatious clothing and behavior to attract a female and to stand out from other competing males, with the intention to become more memorable and interesting. The term derives from the behavior of a male peafowl who displays his ornate tail feathers to attract mates. Peacocking is very common among men, and it can happen either consciously or subconsciously. Peacocking happens subconsciously especially when a desirable female suddenly comes into sight. Prevalence of peacocking strongly correlates with woman's level of attractiveness.

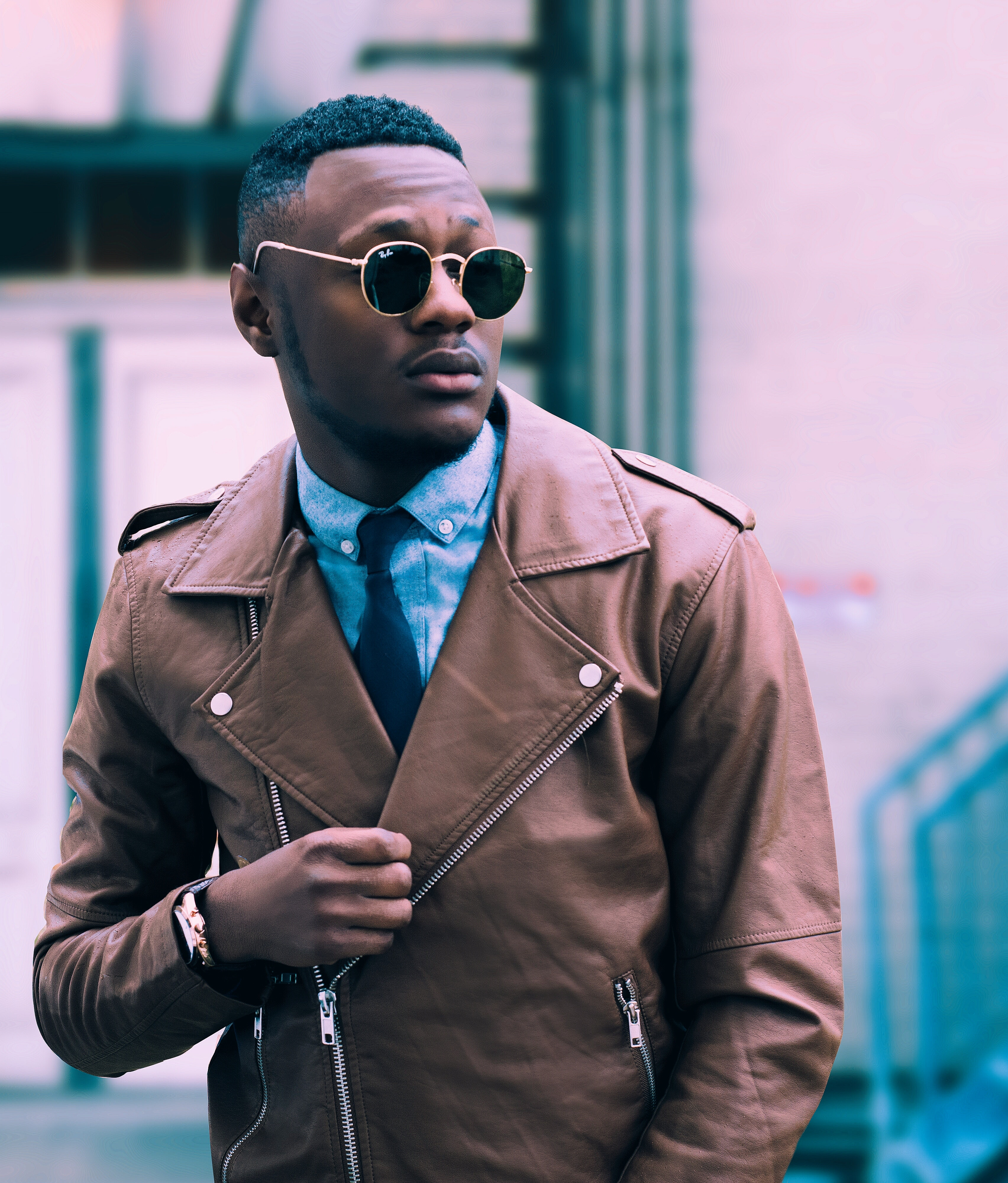
A man displaying a sense of fashion

According to some feminist scholars, men may tend to peacock because of the patriarchal ideas created by society. This hierarchy created between men and women and this idea of men competing for women's attention leads to peacocking.

Among non-humans, other displays of peacocking may include auditory or visual behaviors, such as songs or dances. These behaviors signal reproductive fitness.

== Biological approach ==
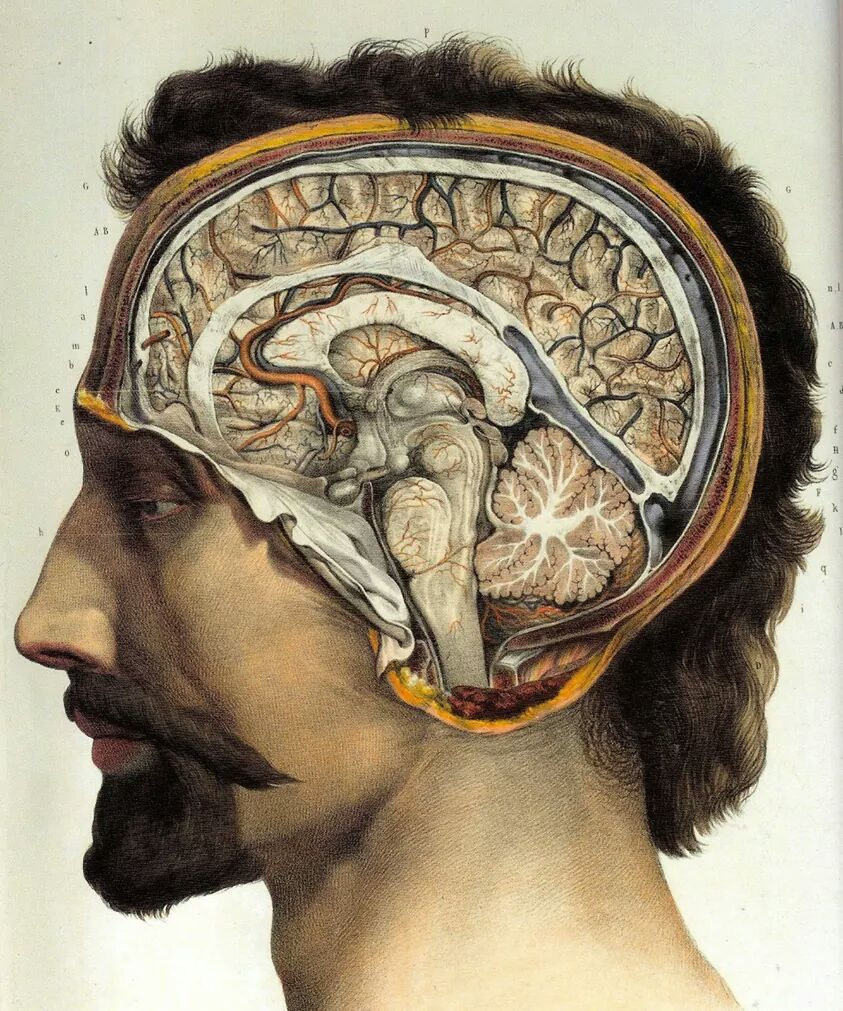
The following illustration shows the components of the brain. The neocortex is the outermost layer of the brain (top portion)

The behavior often termed “peacocking” is a type of intersexual selection that uses sexual ornamentation, through vibrant and elaborate displays that attracts a mate. Darwin's observations of the peacock drove him to a biological dilemma in which the peacock's tail did not fit the description of natural selection. He proposed that the peacock's tail served as a costly signal (a trait that is expensive to produce or maintain), indicating his genetic fitness (the ability to successfully pass down genes to the next generation) despite the survival disadvantage. Darwin's findings were further elaborated by evolutionary biologist Amotz Zahavi, who described peacocking as an exhibition of signals that serve as reliable indicators of genetic fitness. This “honest signaling,” demonstrates the expenditure of time, energy, and resources required to provide the ornamentation display. The reliability of this demonstration, in turn, influences females to become the choosier sex, leading them to select mates whose ornamental qualities will be inherited by their offspring. These principles provide the comparative framework to analyze the human brain's role in peacocking behavior.

=== Mind-mating hypothesis ===
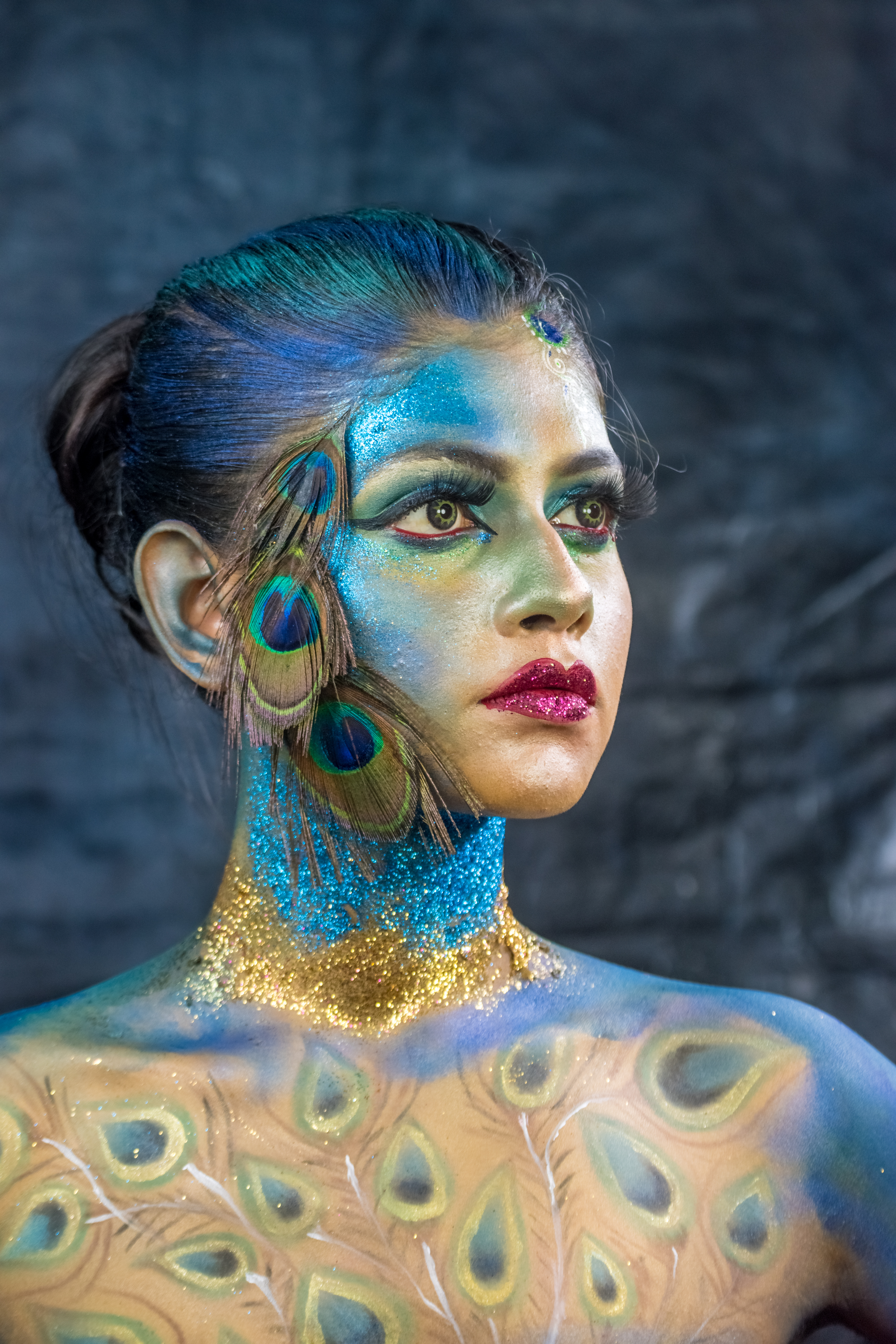
Artistic Representation of "human peacocking"

Evolutionary psychologists Geoffrey Miller theorizes in his “mind-mating hypothesis,” that the human brain serves as a form of sexual ornamentation that utilizes high-level cognition to signal genetic quality through courtship displays. Intelligence and creative fitness are human traits that exemplify this type of signaling; they are costly and honest signal—a form of peacocking behavior—designed to acquire a mate. Intelligence fitness refers to high-level cognitive expressions, such as wit, which signal metabolic efficiency. This signal is honest as it demonstrates individuals with genetic quality that can afford the continuous energy cost of running a high-performing brain. Creative fitness is an observable cognitive output, such as artistic skill or narrative ability, that signals resource abundance and brain developmental stability (reduced mutation frequency). This signal is perceived as honest because the neocortex structure is susceptible to mutations and genetic diseases; therefore, high creativity indicates a functional brain with optimal health. By demonstrating genetic quality and optimal neuroanatomical development and function, this combination of traits signals to potential mates a high potential for long-term pair-bonds, thereby supporting offspring care and viability. However, while the mating mind hypothesis remains an influential model, viewed as one way of interpreting human peacocking, it is criticized for its over emphasis on sexual selection, ignoring other selective pressures, and empirical evidence inconsistencies.

== Societal approach to understanding 'peacocking' behaviour ==
In human society, peacocking can be observed through a combination of biological, cultural, and social signaling. Clothing, appearance, and digital self–presentation can function as forms of signaling to enhance attractiveness or demonstrate status.

=== Fashion as a tool of self-enhancement ===
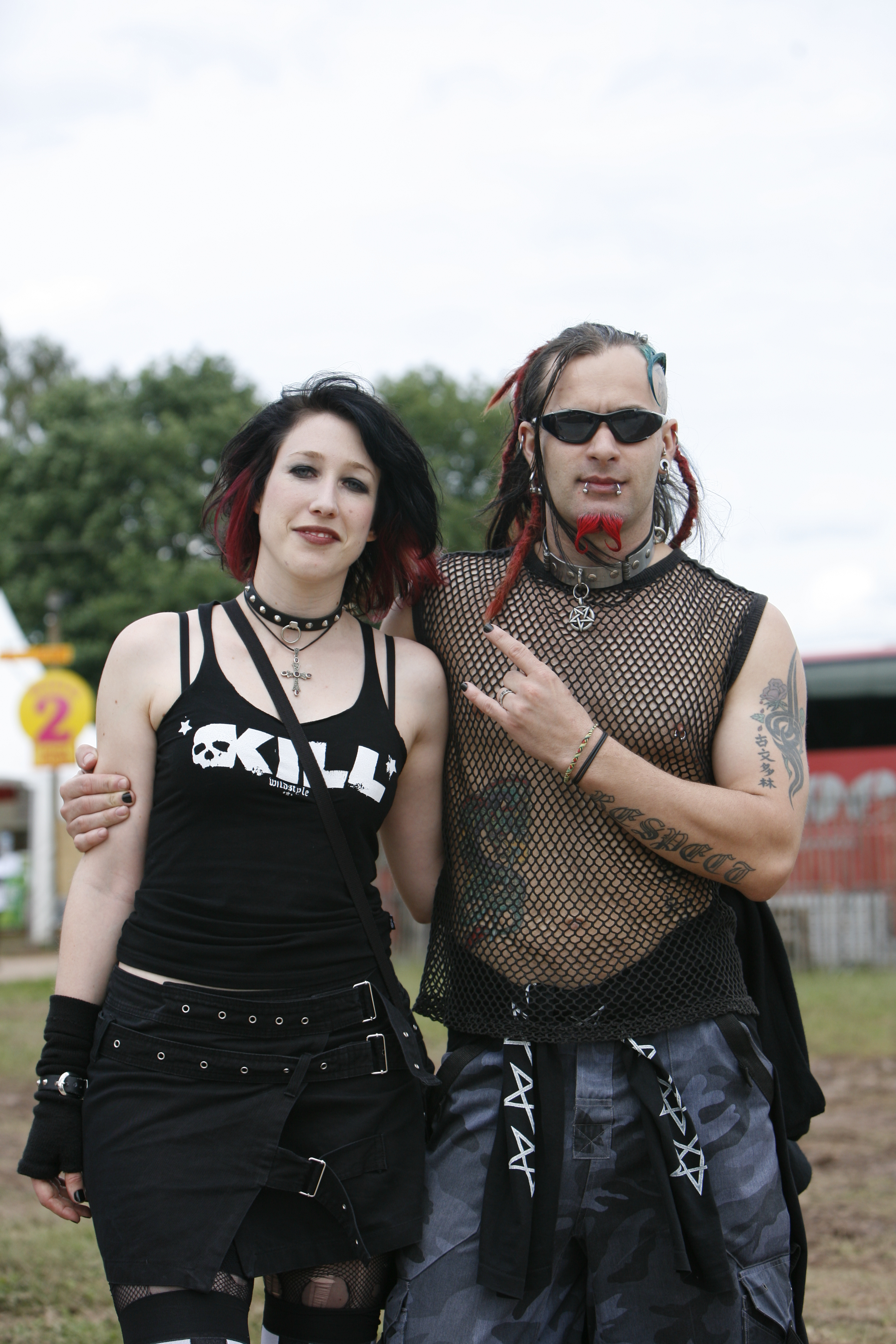
Goth people at the Eurockéennes of 2007. Authorization granted by the subject.

Peacocking in humans can be understood through the lens of the costly signaling theory, also known as the handicap principle. The handicap principle hypothesizes that individuals can signal honesty and credibility through costly traits, since only the fittest have the luxury to bear them. Fashion is a dominant method of peacocking in humans for it is a tool used to gain attention or enhance overall attractiveness. Fashion can allow individuals to be successful in attracting mates by standing out against other competitors. In contemporary consumer society, designer goods can act as a social signal that indicate wealth, cultural knowledge, or group affiliation. Men who purchase conspicuous items enhance their desirability, though are often perceived by potential mates as a short-term partner. Additionally, the increase of sub-genres in fashion allows individuals to specifically communicate their interests, values, and personality through a visual medium. Fashion is a tool that functions as a social signal to establish identity.

=== Tattoos as health fitness and personality indicators ===
An example of biological and cultural overlap can be found in the practice of tattooing. A 2019 study published in the American Journal of Human Biology examined tattooing in American Samoa and discovered that repeated tattooing is associated with increased immune system activation. From an anthropological standpoint, this finding suggests that tattoos can signal endurance, pain tolerance and health resilience. These traits can be socially or reproductively advantageous.

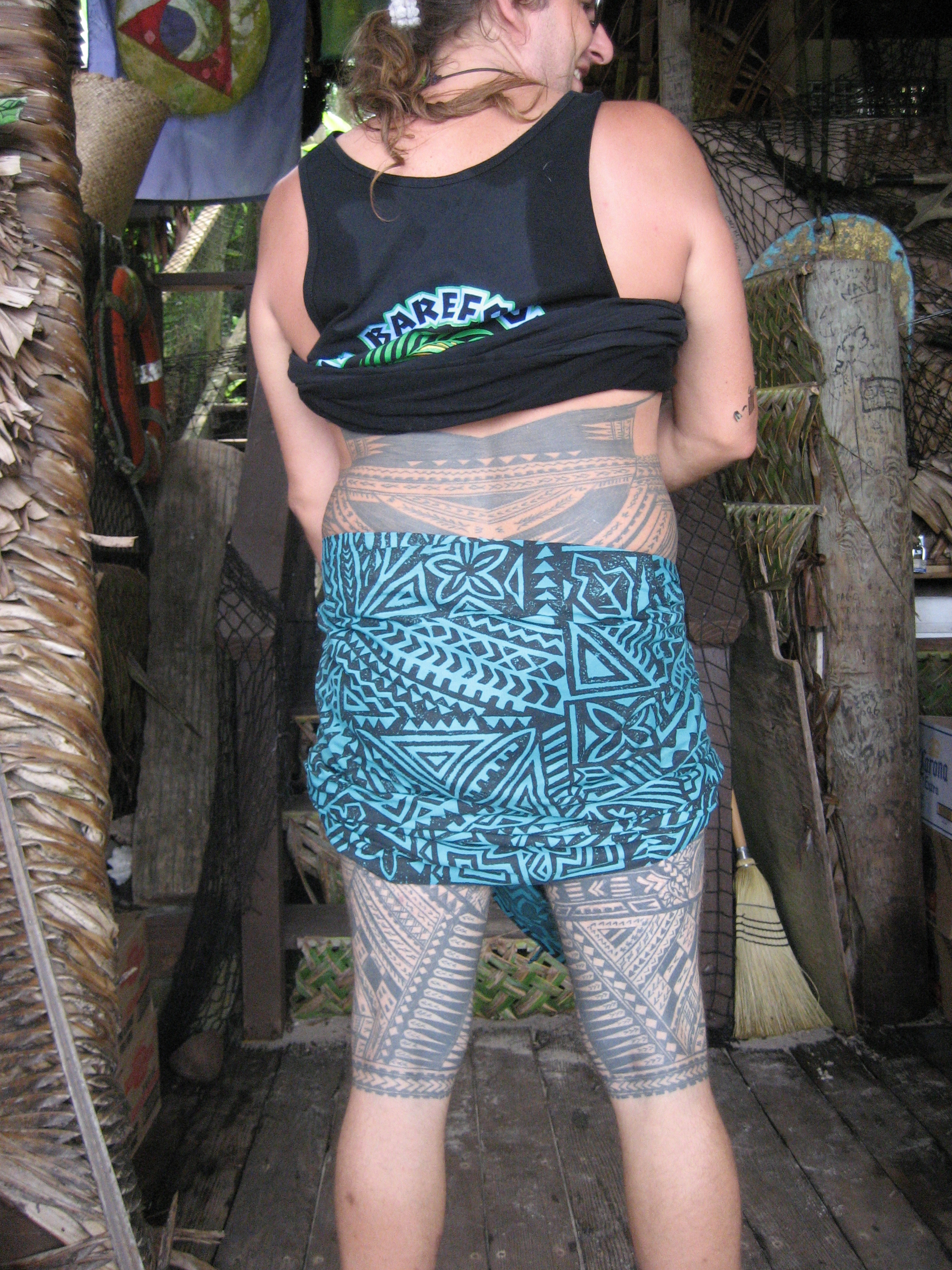
Part of a Full Samoan Tattoo - takes 15 sessions of up to eight hours

Tattoos have evolved from originally having negative connotations to now signifying wealth and social status. What was historically seen as a form of rebellion is now widely accepted in some social classes as an expression of identity. In the past, tattoos were commonly used to represent that the person was a member of a community or shared cultural meaning or social identity. Thus, tattoos hold meaning as a social and cultural signifier. Furthermore, permanent artwork on the body can signal to others your interests and style. Tattoos offer an outlet for individuality and distinction. Tattooed individuals view each other with status as they are marked different from the masses. Additionally, it has been shown that tattooed men are perceived to be attractive and dominant. While perspectives on tattoos still vary, there is an overall tendency of positive appreciation amongst younger generations.

=== The digital age and signaling on social networks ===
With the rise of digital technology, social signaling has extended into online environments. Social media platforms allow for new methods of peacocking, where desirability is quantified through metrics of likes, followers, and views. By selectively posting photos and videos, people can present and communicate aspects of who they are and how they want to be perceived. Presenting a curated self image aims to display a socially desirable image. For example, a modern trend of “thirst trapping”, a conspicuous display of self to be seen as attractive and desirable, is similar to the animal behavior of courtship dances as both are signaling their fitness.

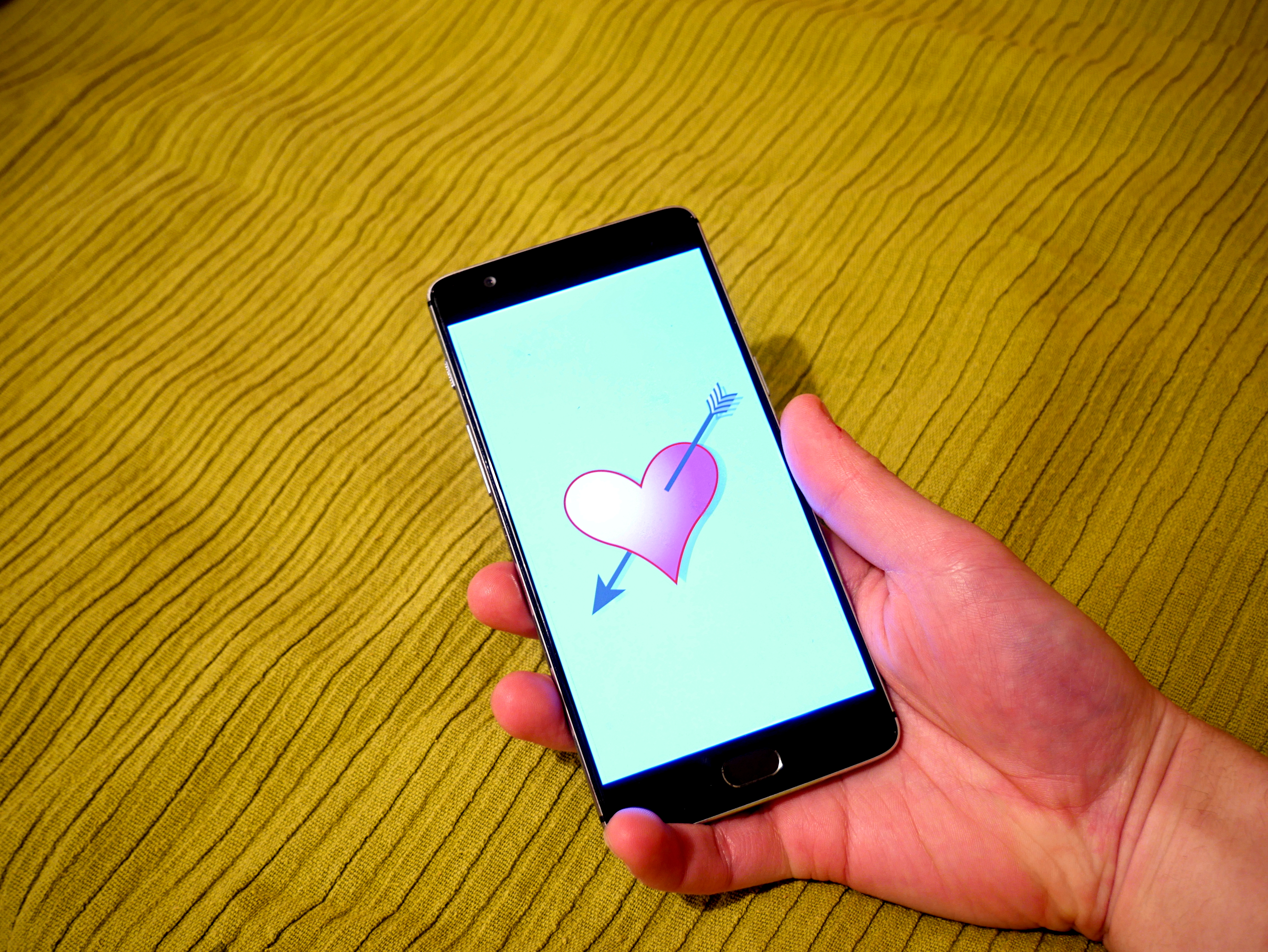
Smartphone dating app illustration.

The rise of dating apps produces another outlet for signaling through a digital medium. Online spaces that aim to promote desirability offer an increased ability for individuals to control their self-presentation. Individuals can engage in strategic activities to convey a specific impression. These strategies are important during relationship initiation as others will use this information to decide whether to pursue the individual. Often, women demonstrate positive facial cues, such as smiling, which can be interpreted as an attempt to signal femininity. Men, on the other hand, are more likely to signal status, resources, and ambition by displaying formal clothing, photos taken in foreign countries, and outdoor activities. Additionally, users may accentuate the features of their physical appearance through close-up photographs, which are sometimes digitally manipulated to enhance their appearance and increase desirability. Dating apps create a dedicated space to conspicuously signal a desirable self-image with the intention of finding a partner.
