= Tosspot =

Insult in British English

Tosspot is a British English and Irish English insult, used to refer to a stupid or contemptible person. The word originally meant a drunkard, but such usage is now rare.

== Original meaning as a drunkard ==
The word is of Middle English origin, and meant a person who drank heavily. Beer or ale was customarily served in ceramic pots, so a tosspot was a person who copiously "tossed back" such pots of beer. The word "tosspots" appears in relation to drunkenness in the song which closes Shakespeare's Twelfth Night. The morality play Like Will to Like, by Shakespeare's contemporary Ulpian Fulwell, contains a character named Tom Tosspot, who remarks that

If any poore man have in a whole week earned a grote,
He shal spend it in one houre in tossing the pot.

Tosspot is also a character in the traditional British Pace Egg play or mummers' play.

In the Pace Egging Song which accompanies the play, the verse for "Old Tosspot" is:

And the last that comes in is Old Tosspot you see.
He's a valiant old man, in every degree.
He's a valiant old man and he wears a pig tail.
And all his delight is in drinking mulled ale!

As with most traditional folk songs, the exact words vary.

In the chapter "Step Eight" of the Alcoholics Anonymous book Twelve Steps and Twelve Traditions by Bill Wilson, the phrase "... tosspot call[ing] a kettle black" causes some confusion for readers who are not familiar with the adage. In the original editions of the book it stated "that is like the pot calling the kettle black." The old saying means a person who is as flawed as the person he or she is criticizing has no right to complain about the other's flaws. The pot, after all, is as blackened by the flames as the kettle. Wilson's pun places the tosspot, or the drunk, in the position of the flawed individual who should not criticize others.

The word is also found in the Roman Catholic Knox Bible, in translating Proverbs 23:30: "Who but the tosspot that sits long over his wine?" (This is a free translation, and does not occur in other translations: for example, the King James Version renders this verse "they that tarry long at the wine; they that go to seek mixed wine".)
