= List of cakes =

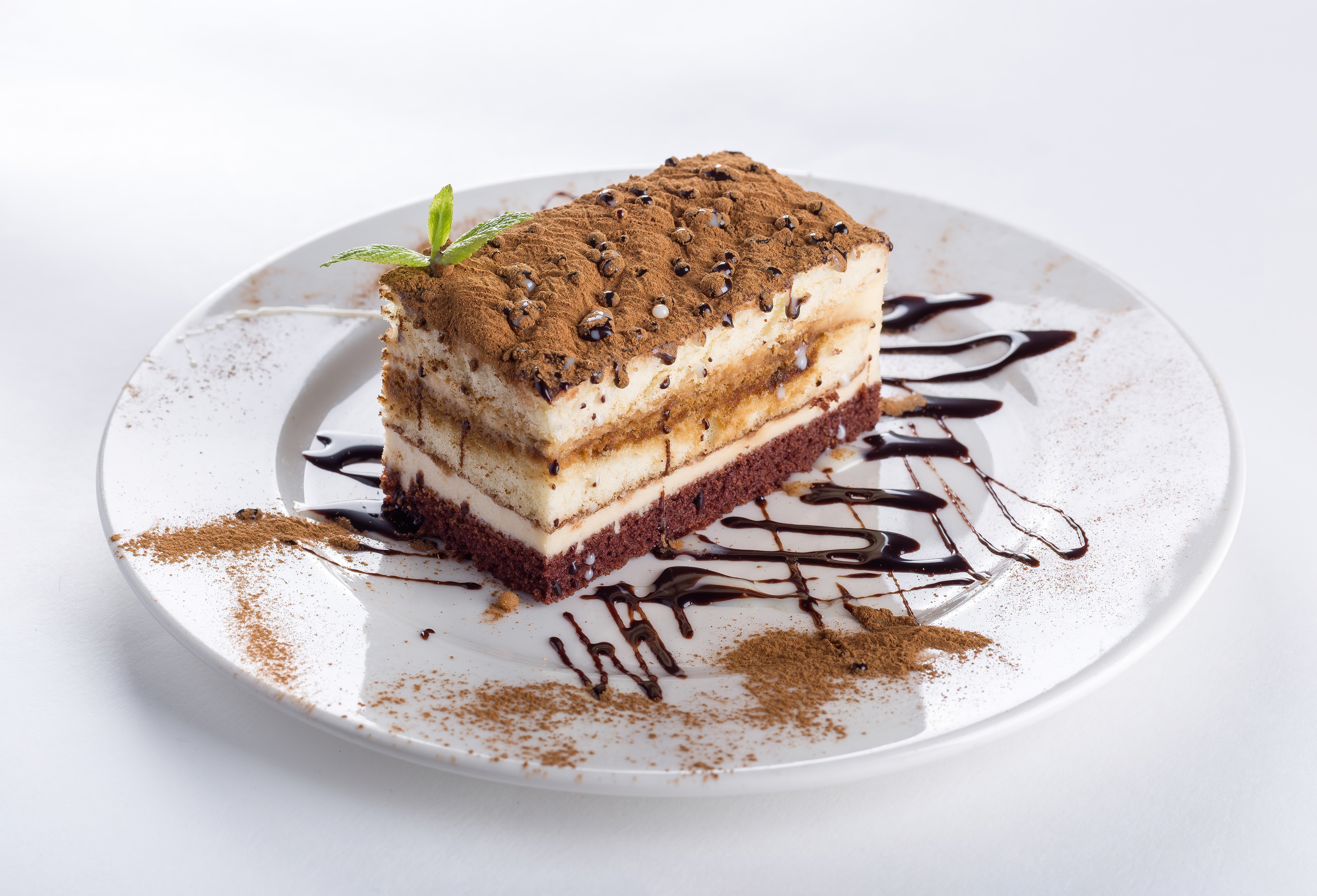
Piece of chocolate cake on a white plate decorated with chocolate sauce

A cake is a baker's confectionery usually made from flour, sugar, and other ingredients and is usually baked. In their oldest forms, cakes were modifications of bread, but cakes now cover a wide range of preparations that can be simple or elaborate and which share features with desserts such as pastries, meringues, custards, and pies. The word "cake" comes from the Old Norse kaka, which is also related to many common English words like "cook".

The most common ingredients of cake include flour, sugar, eggs, fat (such as butter, oil, or margarine), a liquid, and a leavening agent, such as baking soda or baking powder. Common additional ingredients include dried, candied, or fresh fruit, nuts, cocoa, and extracts such as vanilla, with numerous substitutions for the primary ingredients. Cake is often served as a celebratory dish on ceremonial occasions, such as weddings, anniversaries, and birthdays. There are countless cake recipes; some are bread-like, some are rich and elaborate, and many are centuries old.

== Cakes ==
List of cakes
Name	Picture	Origin	Distinctive ingredients and description
Amandine		Romania	A chocolate layered cake filled with chocolate, caramel and fondant cream.
Amygdalopita		Greece	An almond cake made with ground almonds, flour, butter, egg and pastry cream.
Angel cake		United Kingdom	A type of layered sponge cake, often garnished with cream and food coloring.
Angel food cake		United States	A type of sponge cake made with egg whites, sugar, flour, vanilla, and a whipping agent such as cream of tartar.
Apple cake		Germany Ireland Poland United Kingdom	A cake featuring apples, occasionally topped with caramel icing.
Applesauce cake		United States	A cake that is prepared using applesauce, flour, and sugar as primary ingredients.
Babka		Poland and Ukraine	A sweet braided cake originating in the Jewish community.
Babka Wielkanocna		Poland	An Easter cake with icing.
Ballokume		Albania	A cake made with corn flour, butter, sugar, and vanilla.
Banana cake		United States	A cake featuring banana as a primary ingredient.
Bánh bò		Vietnam	A spongey cake with honeycomb-like structures, typically made with coconut milk, rice flour, water and sugar.
Bara brith		Wales	A Welsh tea bread flavored with raisins, currants and candied peel.
Basbousa		Egypt	A traditional Egyptian sweet cake that is made of cooked semolina or farina soaked in simple syrup. Coconut is a popular addition; the syrup may also contain orange flower water or rose water.
Battenberg cake		United Kingdom	A sponge cake held together by jam and covered in marzipan.
Baumkuchen		Germany	A German variety of spit cake also popular in Japan. The characteristic rings, which resemble tree rings when sliced, give the cake its German name, which literally translates to "tree cake".
Beer cake		Ireland	Any cake prepared with beer as a main ingredient; pictured is a chocolate bundt cake infused with stout beer.
Berlingozzo		Italy	A simple ring-shaped yeast cake to celebrate Carnival.
Better than sex cake		United States	A chocolate or yellow cake with a moist, filled center, covered with whipped cream.
Bibikkan		Sri Lanka	A cake made of shredded coconut, jaggery and semolina and a mixture of spices; it is commonly prepared and consumed in celebration of festive and religious occasions.
Bibingka		Philippines	A traditional rice cake from the Philippines made with ground glutinous rice and coconut milk.
Bienenstich (Bee Sting)		Germany	A yeast cake with a topping of caramelized almonds and filled with cream.
Birthday cake		Unknown	A cake that has various ingredients, usually chocolate or sponge, and is often topped with icing and candles; the number of candles on top of the cake are meant to represent someone's age (for example, a birthday cake for a nine-year-old person would have nine candles).
Biscoff cake		United States and Europe	A cake that incorporates Lotus Biscoff cookies.
Bizcocho Dominicano		Dominican Republic	A cake with a moist, airy texture and meringue frosting.
Black Forest cake, often known as "Black Forest gâteau" or "Schwarzwälder Kirschtorte"		Germany	A cake featuring cherries, kirsch, and chocolate. Typically, there is one bottom layer of chocolate shortcrust and two layers of chocolate sponge cake; the cake is then filled with cherry jam and whipped cream.
Blackout cake, sometimes known as "Brooklyn Blackout cake"		United States	A chocolate cake filled with chocolate pudding and topped with chocolate cake crumbs.
Bløtkake		Norway	A type of layer cake from Norway that consists of layers of sukkerbrød, with whipped cream and/or custard.
Bolo de mel		Portugal	A sweet, heavy cake made with molasses or honey, often with walnuts and almonds. The name translates to "honey cake".
Bolo-rei		Portugal	A traditional Portuguese king cake (type of fruitcake), characteristic of the Christmas season and usually crown-shaped.
Boston cream pie		United States	A yellow cake filled with custard and topped with some form of chocolate.
Brazil nut cake		Brazil	A cake prepared using Brazil nuts as a primary ingredient; it is common in the Amazon region of Brazil, Bolivia and Peru
Brazo de Mercedes		Philippines	A traditional Filipino meringue roll with a custard filling typically dusted with powdered sugar.
Broyé poitevin		France	A simple butter cake.
Bublanina		Czech Republic	A sweet kneaded bun with fruit embedded into the top of the pastry.
Buccellato		Italy	A circular cake containing nuts and candied fruit, traditionally associated with Christmas.
Buche de Noel		France	A traditional Christmas cake made to resemble a log, commonly decorated with confections shaped as various woodland items such as mushrooms, snow and berries. Also known as a yule log.
Budapestlängd		Sweden	A rolled meringue-hazelnut cake filled with whipped cream and pieces of canned peach, apricot, or mandarin orange.
Buko pandan cake		Philippines	A sponge or chiffon cake flavored with extracts from boiled pandan leaves and frosted with cream and young coconut or macapuno strips
Bundt cake		United States	A cake that is baked in a Bundt pan, shaping it into a distinctive ring shape. The shape is inspired by a traditional European fruit cake known as Gugelhupf. Bundt cakes are not generally associated with any single recipe, but they are often made with chocolate.
Bustrengo		San Marino, Italy	A dense and moist cake containing cornmeal, bread crumbs or stale bread, figs, raisins, diced apples, lemon rind and orange rind.
Butter cake		United Kingdom	A cake featuring butter as one of the main ingredients.
Butterfly cake		United Kingdom	A variant of cupcake, also called "fairy cake" for its fairy-like "wings". They can be made from any flavor of cake. The top of the fairy cake is cut off or carved out with a spoon, and cut in half. Then, butter cream, whipped cream, or other sweet filling like jam is spread into the hole. Finally, the two cut halves are stuck into the butter cream to look like butterfly wings. The wings of the cake are often decorated using icing to form various patterns.
Butterkuchen		Germany	A simple buttery and sweet German cake baked on a tray.
Cardinal slice		Austria	A classic layered Viennese desert consisting of a sponge cake layer and meringue and filled with red currant jam. The colors of the layers, white and yellow, are meant to represent the colors of the Vatikan.
Carrot cake		United Kingdom	A moist, dense, sweet cake made with carrots. Variations include Rüblitorte, a classic Swiss carrot cake made from a sponge cake with carrots and hazelnuts or almonds, glazed with a sugar glaze, and decorated with small marzipan carrots.
Cassata		Italy	Cassata consists of round sponge cake moistened with fruit juices or liqueur and layered with ricotta, candied peel, and a chocolate or vanilla filling similar to cannoli cream. It is covered with a shell of marzipan, pink and green pastel colored icing, and decorative designs. The cassata is topped with candied fruit depicting cherries and slices of citrus fruit characteristic of Sicily.
Cassatella di sant'Agata		Italy	Cakes shaped like breasts to honor Saint Agatha of Sicily. Made of sponge, moistened with juice or liqueur, and stuffed with ricotta and chocolate. Decorated with marzipan, icing, and candied fruit.
Cassava cake		Philippines	A traditional Filipino moist cake made from grated cassava, coconut milk, and condensed milk with a custard layer on top.
Castagnaccio		Italy	A plain chestnut flour cake.
Castella		Japan	A moist sponge cake made with flour, sugar, eggs, and mizuame.
Caterpillar cake		United Kingdom	A chocolate Swiss roll decorated to look like a caterpillar.
Chantilly cake		United States	A layer cake filled with berries and chantilly cream (a type of sweetened whipped cream)
Chestnut cake		France	A cake prepared using chestnuts or water chestnuts as a main ingredient. It is also dish in Chinese cuisine.
Chhena poda		Odisha	A cake made from milk solids and semolina. The milk solids, known as chhena, are the main ingredient; it is a specialty of the state of Odisha in India.
Chiffon cake		United States	A light, airy cake made with vegetable oil, eggs, sugar, and flour.
Chocolate cake		Unknown	A cake that features chocolate as a primary flavor.
Christmas cake		United Kingdom	A cake flavored with dried fruit such as sultanas or raisins, as well as ingredients such as cinnamon, treacle, cherries, and almond; it is often topped with decorative icing.
Clementine cake		Australia	A cake prepared with clementine as a primary ingredient.
Coconut cake		United States	A popular dessert in the Southern region of the United States. It is a cake frosted with a white frosting and covered in coconut flakes.
Coffee cake		Germany	A single-layer cake flavored with cinnamon and topped with a crumb topping, meant to be eaten with coffee.
Coffee and walnut cake		United Kingdom	A sponge cake made with coffee and walnuts.
Cornbread		Americas	A cake containing wheat flour, cornmeal, sugar, and a fat such as lard or butter.
Cozonac		Bulgaria, Romania	A traditional sweet leavened bread rich in eggs, milk, butter and sugar, with various fillings.
Crema de fruta		Philippines	A traditional Filipino fruitcake made with layers of sponge cake, sweet custard or whipped cream, gelatin or gulaman, and various preserved or fresh fruits, including mangoes, pineapples, cherries, and strawberries. Also has a very popular no-bake variant, the mango float.
Cremeschnitte		Slovenia; Croatia; Germany; Austria	A vanilla and custard cream cake dessert popular in several central-European countries. There are many regional variations, but they all include puff pastry base and custard cream.
Crystal cake		China	A traditional dessert in China, first invented during the Song dynasty. Its name is derived from the shine of its filling and overall appearance.
Cuatro leches cake		Spain	A cake made with four milks, similar to the tres leches cake.
Cuca		Brazil	A dry, flat cake made of eggs, wheat and butter, with various toppings and fillings.
Cucumber cake		India	A cake prepared with cucumber as a primary ingredient. It is a popular dish in Goan cuisine.
Cupcake		United States	A small cake with various ingredients, usually topped with icing.
Dacquoise		France	A cake typically made with almond and hazelnut meringue.
Dadar gulung		Indonesia	A traditional coconut pancake filled with grated coconut and palm sugar.
Date and walnut loaf		United Kingdom	A sweet bread made with dates, walnuts, treacle, and tea.
Date square		Canada	A dessert formed from a layer of minced dates with oat crumble; it's also known as matrimonial cake.
Depression cake		United States	A cake made without milk, sugar, butter, or eggs.
Devil's food cake		United States	A dark, heavy chocolate layer cake.
Doberge cake		New Orleans, United States	A layered cake with custard filling adapted by local baker Beulah Ledner from the Hungarian Dobos torte.
Dobos cake		Hungary	A sponge cake layered with chocolate buttercream and topped with thin caramel slices.
Dolly Varden cake		United States, Australia	A layer cake that was originally premised around the layers contrasting in flavor and appearance, and later designed to look like a doll wearing a dress. Named after Dolly Varden, a character in a Charles Dickens novel.
Dundee cake		Scotland	A fruit cake without glacé cherries topped with almonds.
Dutch carnival cake		Netherlands	A traditional Dutch delicacy similar to gingerbread cake.
Eccles cake		Northern England	A pastry filled with currants.
Eierschecke		Germany	A sheet cake made of yeast dough topped with apple, quark curd, and poppy seeds; parts of it are covered with a glaze made of cream, whole egg, sugar, and flour.
Election cake		United States	A cake historically eaten around elections in some of the Thirteen Colonies and later United States, and during celebrations
Erotic cake		Unknown	A cake made to resemble or decorated with the image of a human body (often nude or semi-nude), individual sex organs, or sexual activities, sometimes with a statement of a sexual nature written on it
Esterházy torte		Hungary; Austria	A Hungarian cake (torta) named after Prince Paul III Anton Esterházy de Galántha (1786–1866). It was invented by Budapest confectioners in the late 19th century. It consists of cognac or vanilla buttercream, sandwiched between layers of almond meringue (macaroon) dough. The torte is iced with a fondant glaze and decorated with a characteristic chocolate striped pattern.
Falculelle		France	A small cake of brocciu cheese baked on a chestnut leaf.
Fanta cake (Fantakuchen)		Germany	A sponge cake made using Fanta or sparkling mineral water.
Fat rascal		United Kingdom	A pastry made from dried fruit, candied peel, and oats.
Fig cake		Egypt	A cake prepared with fig as a primary ingredient.
Financier		France	A small molded almond flour and beurre noisette cake.
Flan cake		Philippines	A chiffon or sponge cake baked with a layer of leche flan (crème caramel) on top and drizzled with caramel syrup.
Fondant Fancy		United Kingdom	A small sponge cake topped with fondant icing.
Fragelité		Denmark	A cake made with meringue, almonds, butter, and coffee.
Frankfurter Kranz (Frankfurt Crown Cake)		Germany	A sponge cake filled with buttercream icing and red jam (typically strawberry, blackcurrant or cherry); it is then topped with brittle nuts, toasted almond flakes or ground hazelnuts.
Frog cake		Australia	A sponge cake decorated with cream and fondant so that it looks like a frog's head
Fruitcake		Ancient Rome	A rich cake with candied fruit and spices; many versions of the cake contain currants, sultanas, and glacé cherries.
Fudge cake			A chocolate cake containing fudge.
Garash cake		Bulgaria	A chocolate cake made with walnuts, egg whites, and powdered sugar.
Gâteau magique		France	A cake with distinctive layers of custard, cream, and sponge that form while baking.
Gâteau nantais		Nantes, France	A pound cake with almonds and rum.
Pandolce		Italy	A cake made with sultanas, raisins, and glacé cherries.
Genoise (Genoese cake)		France	A sponge cake made with a whole egg.
German Chocolate Cake		United States	A chocolate cake with a coconut-pecan filling and chocolate frosting.
Ghevar		India	A disc-shaped cake made from flour and ghee, soaked in sugar syrup, and topped with saffron, spices, and nuts.
Gingerbread		United Kingdom	A cake typically flavored with spices such as ginger, cloves, cinnamon, and nutmeg.
Gooey butter cake		United States	A flat, dense cake made with butter and frequently topped with powdered sugar.
Goose breast (Gåsebryst)		Denmark	A cream cake known as Gåsebryst in Denmark. It consists of a Danish pastry bottom that is topped with whipped cream, custard, and jam. These layers are then wrapped in marzipan.
Gorgon cake		China	A sweet and chewy cake made using gorgon fruit seeds.
Halloween cake		United States	A cake prepared with Halloween-themed decorations
Hash brownies		Netherlands; Belgium	Also known as "space cakes", these are bakery products made using one of the forms of cannabis, including hashish.
Hevva cake		Cornwall, England	A heavy cake containing raisins.
Hot milk cake		United States	A butter sponge cake made with scalded milk.
Hummingbird cake		Jamaica	A cake made with bananas, pineapples, pecans, vanilla, and various spices.
Ice cream cake		Unknown	A cake with at least one layer of ice cream.
Jaffa Cakes		United Kingdom	A biscuit-sized cake introduced by McVitie and Price in 1927 and named after Jaffa oranges. The most common forms of Jaffa Cakes are circular, 2.5 inches (64 mm) in diameter and have three layers: a Genoise sponge base, a layer of orange flavored jelly, and a coating of chocolate.
Jajan pasar		Java, Indonesia	Traditional Javanese cakes sold in Javanese markets.
Japanese cheesecake		Japan	Japanese cheesecake is a sponge cake, Soufflé-style (light, airy and fluffy).
Joffre cake		Romania	A chocolate buttermilk layer cake filled with chocolate ganache.
Karpatka		Poland	A Polish variation of a cream pie, related to the Kremówka. It is made from two layers of pâte à choux pastry filled with a thick, vanilla-flavored custard cream. The name of the cake is derived from the Carpathian Mountains.
Khanom bodin		Thailand	A dense cake made from wheat or Maida flour, fresh butter, and sweetened condensed milk.
Khanom farang kudi chin		Thailand	A cake topped with raisins, dried sweet gourds, and white sugar.
King cake		France; Portugal; Spain	A cake associated with Epiphany in many countries; its ingredients vary, but traditionally there is a fève hidden inside.
Kladdkaka		Sweden	A dense Swedish chocolate cake lacking baking powder.
Klepon		Indonesia	A dessert formed from traditional green-colored balls of rice cake filled with liquid palm sugar and coated in grated coconut.
Kliņģeris		Latvia	A type of pretzel-shaped pastry.
Kołacz		Poland	A ceremonial sweet bread that may have fillings such as cheese or dried plum.
Kouign-amann		France	A sweet cake made with laminated dough.
Kornigou		France	A fruit cake in the shape of antlers.
Kransekake		Denmark; Norway	A layered ring cake made from almonds, sugar, and egg whites.
Krantz cake		Israel, Ashkenazi Jewish cuisine	A yeasted cake with a chocolate or poppy seed filling.
Kremówka		Poland	A Polish type of cream pie. It is made of two layers of puff pastry, filled with whipped cream, creamy buttercream, custard cream, or egg white cream; it is usually sprinkled with powdered sugar, but it also can be decorated with cream or covered with a layer of icing.
Kue cubit		Indonesia	A small cake eaten as a snack.
Kue lapis		Indonesia Origin: China	A traditional cake of colorful layered soft rice flour pudding.
Kue mangkok		Indonesia	A traditional steamed cupcake. The ingredients include flour, rice flour, tapioca, yeast, eggs, coconut milk, sugar and salt.
Kue rangi		Indonesia	Kue rangi or also called sagu rangi is an Indonesian coconut kue or traditional snack made of a coconut and starch-based batter and cooked in a special molded pan.
Kutia		Poland; Belarus; Ukraine; Lithuania; Russia	A ceremonial grain dish that can include nuts and raisins.
Kvæfjord cake or Verdens beste		Norway	A sponge cake baked with meringue, vanilla cream and almonds.
Kyiv cake		Ukraine	A cake composed of two airy layers of meringue filled with hazelnuts, chocolate glaze, and buttercream.
Lady Baltimore cake		Southern United States	A white layer cake filled with fruits and nuts and covered with a fluffy frosting.
Lamington		Australia	A dessert made with squares of cake covered with chocolate sauce and desiccated coconut.
Lane cake		United States	A bourbon-laced cake with a fruit and nut filling.
Lardy cake		England	A traditional rich spiced form of bread made with freshly rendered lard, flour, sugar, spices, currants and raisins
Layer cake		Unknown	A category of dessert that involves stacked layers of cake held together by some type of filling.
Lekach		Ancient Egypt, Rome and the Middle East, Germany	Honey-sweetened cake made by Jews, especially for the Jewish holiday of Rosh Hashanah.
Lemon cake		Unknown, but likely England	A cake with a lemon flavor.
Linzer Torte		Austria	A thick layer of cinnamon and clove spiced shortcrust topped with red currant jam and a lattice design of dough strips.
Madeira cake		United Kingdom	A light butter cake usually flavored with lemon. Sometimes confused with Bolo de mel cakes, which are actually made in Madeira using a completely different recipe.
Madeleine		Lorraine	A small shell-shaped sponge cake.
Magdalena		Spain	A Spanish muffin or cupcake variation, typically flavored with lemon.
Malay sponge cake		Malaysia China	Malay sponge cake is a cake in Guangdong and Hong Kong. The cake is made of lard or butter, flour, sugar and eggs, and prepared using a bamboo steamer to develop puffiness. An entire Malay sponge cake is a huge round yellow cake.
Mamón		Philippines	Mamón are traditional Filipino chiffon cakes or sponge cakes,
Mané pelado		Brazil	A creamy cake made of yuca, coconut, and cheese.
Mango cake		Philippines	A chiffon cake or roll topped with mango cream frosting and fresh Carabao mango slices.
Mantecada		Spain	A square, spongy pastry.
Marble cake		Germany	A vanilla, coffee, or chocolate butter cake wherein two differently colored batters are swirled together to show a marble-like pattern.
Marcinek		Poland	A cake consisting of about twenty layers of thin dough. It originates from the Podlasie region.
Marjolaine		France	A long and rectangular variation on the dacquoise that combines almond and hazelnut meringue layers with chocolate buttercream.
Mazurek		Poland	An Easter cake with a short pastry base and various toppings.
Medivnyk		Ukraine	Ukrainian honey cake containing buckwheat honey, wheat flour and spices.
Medovik		Russia	A layer cake popular in Russia and other countries of the former Soviet Union, often referred to as a Russian honey cake. The identifying ingredients are honey and smetana or condensed milk.
Merveilleux		Belgium	Two light meringues welded and covered with whipped cream and dusted with chocolate shavings.
Mikado cake		Armenia	Armenian cake originating in the USSR, prepared with the boiled condensed milk or dulce de leche.
Mille-feuille		France	A cake consisting of three layers of puff pastry alternating with two layers of pastry cream. The top is glazed in white (icing) and brown (chocolate) strips, and combed into a distinctive pattern. This cake is also known as a Napoleon.
Mimosa cake		Italy	First created in Rieti in the 1950s, the name comes from the small pieces of sponge cake scattered on the surface, which resemble mimosa flowers in shape.
Misérable cake		Belgium	A traditional Belgian almond sponge cake.
Miodownik		Poland	A Polish layer cake. The main ingredient is honey, from which the cake's name comes from.
Molten chocolate cake		France	A popular dessert that combines the elements of a flourless chocolate cake and a soufflé. It is also known as a lava cake.
Mooncake		China	A Chinese bakery product traditionally eaten during the Mid-Autumn Festival.
Moravian sugar cake		Pennsylvania German Country /United States	A sweet coffee cake that originated in the colonial Moravian Church. It is made with a sweet yeast dough enriched with mashed potatoes and topped with a mixture of melted butter, brown sugar, and cinnamon.
Napoleonskake		Nordic countries	A cake that is similar to tompouce, with different flavors like caramel or carob.
Napoleonshat		Denmark	A marzipan based cake shaped like a Napoleon's Hat and dipped in dark chocolate.
Nonnette		France	A small gingerbread cake with honey and orange marmalade.
Onion cake		East Asia, Central Asia & Southeast Asia	A savory or sweet cake prepared with onion as a primary ingredient.
Opera cake		France	A dessert with layers of ganache and sponge cake soaked in coffee syrup.
Othellolagkage		Denmark	A layer cake with sponge cake, cream, chocolate, raspberry, egg, vanilla, and marzipan.
Pain d'épices		Reims and Alsace	A French quick bread containing rye flour, honey, and spices.
Pain de Gênes		Genoa	A cake made primarily from almond paste, eggs, and melted butter.
Pão de Ló		Portugal	A Portuguese sponge cake made of eggs, sugar, and wheat flour.
Pão-de-Ló de Ovar		Portugal	Pão de Ló de Ovar is a variety of Pão de Ló (sponge cake), typical and traditional from Ovar.
Pan di Spagna		Italy	Pan di Spagna is a sponge cake, soft and spongy.
Pandispanya		Turkey	n the cuisine of the Turks, pandİspanya is made as a syrup-soaked.
Pandan cake		Malaysia; Indonesia	A light, fluffy, green-colored sponge cake. The ingredients are flour, eggs, butter or margarine, sugar, and pandan leaf.
Panettone		Italy	A sweet bread containing candied citrus and raisins.
Panpepato		Italy	A round, sweet cake filled with nuts such as almonds, hazelnuts, and pine nuts.
Parkin		Northern England	A gingerbread cake made with treacle and oats.
Parrozzo		Italy	A cake made with semolina and almond flour and then covered with dark chocolate.
Pavlova		New Zealand	A cake named after Anna Pavlova and made with meringue.
Petit gâteau		France	A small chocolate cake that is usually served with ice cream.
Petits fours		France	A French dessert made from sponge cake cut into small cubes and coated with fondant icing; the cake is sometimes filled with marzipan or jam.
Poppy seed roll & Makowiec		Poland Hungary	A poppy seed cake normally decorated with icing and orange zest.
Pineapple cake		Taiwan	A Taiwanese sweet traditional pastry containing butter, flour, eggs, sugar, and pineapple jam or slices.
Piñata Smash Cake	Pinata Smash Cake	Mexico	A sponge cake with a candy and cream filling that is smashed open in a manner similar to a piñata.
Plum cake		England	The name plum cake has referred to fruitcake prepared with dried plum and spices in England since around 1700; today, it refers to a cake prepared with dried fruits (such as raisins) as the primary ingredients.
Poffertjes		Netherlands; Belgium; Luxembourg; Germany; Switzerland; Austria	A batter cake made with yeast and buckwheat flour that resembles small, fluffy pancakes.
Pork cake		United States	A historical cake that used salt pork as shortening, and sometimes included cooked pork meat as well.
Pound cake		United Kingdom	A cake traditionally made with a pound each of its four main ingredients (flour, butter, eggs, and sugar); today, ingredient proportions vary.
Princess cake		Sweden	A cake with alternating layers of sponge cake and whipped cream followed a layer of fresh raspberries and a layer of custard; all these layers are topped with a layer of marzipan.
Prinzregententorte		Germany	A torte consisting of at least six thin layers of sponge cake layered with chocolate buttercream and covered in dark chocolate glaze.
Pryanik		Poland	A type of gingerbread spiced with cinnamon, ginger, cloves and cardamom.
Pudingový koláč		Slovakia	In Slovak cuisine, pudingový koláč (so smotanou), is a cake base of sponge cake, pudding and sweetened sour cream.
Punschkrapfen		Austria	A dessert with a base of either cake crumbs or sponge cake that is then filled with nougat and jam and soaked with rum. It is covered with a thick rum sugar glaze and topped with chocolate or a cocktail cherry.
Puto		Philippines	A dish consisting of steamed rice cakes, traditionally made from slightly fermented rice dough. They are eaten as is or as an accompaniment to a number of savory dishes.
Putu		Indonesia	A traditional cylindrical-shaped and green-colored steamed cake. The cake is made of rice flour called suji and that is colored green with pandan extract, filled with palm sugar, steamed in bamboo tubes, and served with grated coconut.
Queen cake		United Kingdom	A soft, muffin-sized cake that gained popularity around the early 18th century; it contains currants and is flavored with mace and orange or lemon water.
Queen Elizabeth cake		Canada	A moist date cake with a coconut topping.
Raisin cake		Germany	A cake prepared with raisins as a primary ingredient.
Red bean cake		Japan; China	A cake made with hardened red bean paste.
Red velvet cake		United States	A soft chocolate cake that is colored red and topped with cream cheese icing.
Robert E. Lee cake		United States	A citrus-flavored layer cake, named for Robert E. Lee, a Confederate general during the American Civil War.
Rock cake		United Kingdom	A small, rough cake that typically includes flavorings such as currants and candied peel.
Rogel		Argentina	A variant of the French pastry mille-feuille, made with dulce de leche filling and topped with Italian meringue.
Rum baba		France, Italy	A small yeast cake soaked with rum and sometimes filled with cream.
Rum cake		Jamaica, Trinidad and Tobago	A cake that traditionally contains dried fruit soaked in rum.
Ruske kape		Bosnia; Serbia	A dessert consisting of alternating layers of vanilla and chocolate cake; this base is then topped with chocolate and decorated with coconut at the edges.
Sachertorte		Austria	A sweet chocolate butter cake that is filled with apricot jam and frosted with chocolate fondant icing; it is traditionally served with whipped cream.
Šakotis / Sękacz		Lithuania; Poland	A traditional cake created by painting layers of dough onto a spit rotating over an open fire.
Sans rival		Philippines	A cake composed of layers of buttercream, meringue, and chopped cashews.
Santiago cake		Spain	An almond cake topped with a Santiago cross design in powdered sugar.
Serabi		Indonesia	A traditional pancake that is made from rice flour with coconut milk or shredded coconut as an emulsifier and eaten with thick golden-brown coconut sugar syrup.
Sfouf		Lebanon	An almond-semolina cake flavored with turmeric, sesame paste, anise, and pine nuts.
Sheet cake		United States	A cake baked in a large, flat rectangular pan, such as a sheet or jelly roll pan.
Siberia (cake)		Japan	Siberia is a Japanese cake made with castella cakes and yōkan.
Simnel cake		United Kingdom	A layered fruitcake that includes marzipan.
Smith Island Cake		United States	A dessert consisting of 8 to 15 thin layers of cake alternating with chocolate buttercream; condensed or evaporated milk is commonly used.
Snack cake		Unknown	A type of baked dessert confectionery made from cake.
Snow skin mooncake		Hong Kong	A type of mooncake eaten during the Mid-Autumn Festival that was developed by a bakery in Hong Kong as an alternative to traditional mooncakes, which are made with ingredients such as salted duck egg yolks and lotus seed paste that result in a high level of sugar and oil.
Spekkoek		Indonesia	A multi-layered cake containing cinnamon, clove, mace, and anise.
Spettekaka		Scania and Halland	A Swedish variation on a spit cake made from potato flour.
Spice cake		North America	A cake flavored with spices such as cinnamon, cloves, allspice, ginger, or mace.
Spiku		Indonesia	A cake with similar ingredients to a spekkoek that only has three layers of vanilla and chocolate cake.
Spit cake		Ancient Greece	A term that can refer to any number of hollow, cylindrical cakes prepared on a rotating spit in several European countries.
Sponge cake		United Kingdom	A light cake made with egg whites, flour, and sugar.
Stack cake		United States	A stack of cakes made with molasses and layered with some form of apple filling.
Strawberry cake		United States; Canada; France	A cake that uses strawberry as a primary ingredient.
Streuselkuchen		Germany	A yeast cake topped with streusel.
Suncake		Taiwan	A popular Taiwanese dessert originally from the city of Taichung. The typical fillings consist of condensed malt sugar, and the cakes are usually sold in special gift boxes as souvenirs for visitors.
Swiss roll		United Kingdom; United States; Canada	A roll cake of varying colors filled with jam or some sort of cream; despite its name, the cake was not developed in Switzerland.
Tea loaf		United Kingdom	A sweet bread containing currants and sultanas that are soaked in tea.
Teacake		United Kingdom	A small cake meant to be eaten with tea.
Tipsy cake		United Kingdom	Sponge cake soaked in alcohol served with cream or custard.
Tokyo Banana		Japan	Tokyo Banana is a Japanese banana-shaped sponge cake with a cream filling. The pastry cream contains strained banana puree to enhance its natural flavor.
Tomato soup cake		United states	Tomato soup cake is a cake made using canned tomato soup, popular during the Great Depression.
Torta Barozzi		Italy	A flourless chocolate cake flavored with rum, coffee, and almonds.
Torta alla Monferrina		Montferrat	An autumn cake made from pumpkin, apples and sugar and flavored with dried figs, amaretti, chocolate, and rum.
Torta caprese		Italy	A dense, fudgy cake prepared with chocolate and almond, made with no flour of any kind.
Torta della nonna		Italy	Torta della nonna is a dessert typical of the region of Tuscany in Italy. It is a sweet pastry cake filled with vanilla-flavored custard and covered with pine nuts and confectioner's sugar.
Torta delle rose		Italy	A Mantuan and Brescian cake that is made with leavened dough rich in butter and sugar. The dough is rolled up and placed in the baking tin so that it takes the cake's characteristic shape of a basket of rosebuds, hence the name.
Torta setteveli		Italy	A seven-layer cake that includes chocolate and hazelnuts.
Torta Tre Monti		San Marino	A cake with alternating layers of thin wafers and chocolate or hazelnut cream.
Toruń gingerbread		Poland	The Polish version of gingerbread, originating from the city of Toruń.
Træstammer		Denmark	A log-shaped cake made from cocoa powder, sugar, butter, rum, marzipan, and chocolate.
Tres leches cake		Mexico; Costa Rica; Nicaragua; Colombia; Spain	A sponge cake soaked with evaporated milk, condensed milk, and heavy or sour cream.
Tunis cake		Scotland; Northern Ireland	A Madeira cake covered with a thick layer of chocolate and decorated with marzipan.
Tuxedo cake		Unknown	A sheet or circular cake with layers of chocolate cake, chocolate mousse, whipping cream and sometimes a layer of vanilla sponge cake. The dark and light colours of the cake are meant to resemble a tuxedo.
Ube cake		Philippines	A traditional Filipino chiffon cake or sponge cake made with ube halaya.
Upside-down cake		United Kingdom	A cake baked with its toppings (usually fruit such as pineapples) at the bottom of the pan. Before serving, the cake is flipped to be right-side up.
Vestfirskar hveitikökur		Iceland	The Icelandic Westfjords wheatcakes are eaten both everyday and for festive occasions, but many consider them indispensable during Christmas. In the past, they were baked or fried on stoves like flat cakes, but today most people use a pan or a pancake pan and let them bake or toast in the dry pan.
Victoria sponge cake		United Kingdom	A cake named after Queen Victoria, typically consisting of jam and whipped double cream or vanilla cream sandwiched between two sponge cakes; the top of the cake is decorated with a dusting of icing sugar.
Watergate cake		United States	A pistachio cake which shares its name with the Watergate scandal of the 1970s.
Wedding cake		Unknown	A cake that is traditionally served at weddings. In the UK, the wedding cake is served at a wedding breakfast, a shared meal held after the ceremony (not necessarily in the morning). In other Western cultures, the cake is usually on display and served to guests at the reception.
Welsh cake		Wales	A sweet bread, usually made with currants, that is traditionally cooked on a bakestone.
White cake		Unknown	A vanilla flavored cake made without egg yolks.
Whoopie pies		United States	A dessert made of two round pieces of chocolate cake with a sweet, creamy frosting serving as the filling.
Wine cake		Colombia	A cake made with wine.
Wuzetka		Poland	A Polish cake consisting of two spongy chocolate cakes, spread with jam and moistened with rum, with a layer of cream between them. The cake is topped with chocolate. The name derives from the W-Z Route in Warsaw.
Yema cake		Philippines	A chiffon cake with a custard filling known as yema.
Zuger Kirschtorte		Switzerland	A cake made with layers of nut meringue, sponge cake and buttercream. It is flavored with kirschwasser.
Zuppa Inglese		Italy	A layered dessert consisting of sponge cake soaked in Alchermes and custard.

== See also ==
- List of baked goods
- List of breads
- List of buns
- List of desserts
- List of pancakes
- List of pastries
- List of pies, tarts and flans
- Pop out cake
- Rice cake
- Snack cake
- Fish cake
