= Savarin =

Savarin may refer to:

== Surname ==
- Charles Savarin (born 1943), a politician from Dominica
- Jean Anthelme Brillat-Savarin (1755–1826), a French lawyer, politician, epicure and gastronome
- Julian Jay Savarin (born 1950), British musician, songwriter, poet and science fiction author
- Orlando Savarin (6 September 1938 – 2 January 2024), Italian rower

== Other ==
- Savarin cake, a kind of rum baba
- Savarin mould, a ring-shaped cake mould
- Red Savarin, protagonist of Solatorobo: Red the Hunter
