= Dutch carnival cake =

Traditional Dutch cake

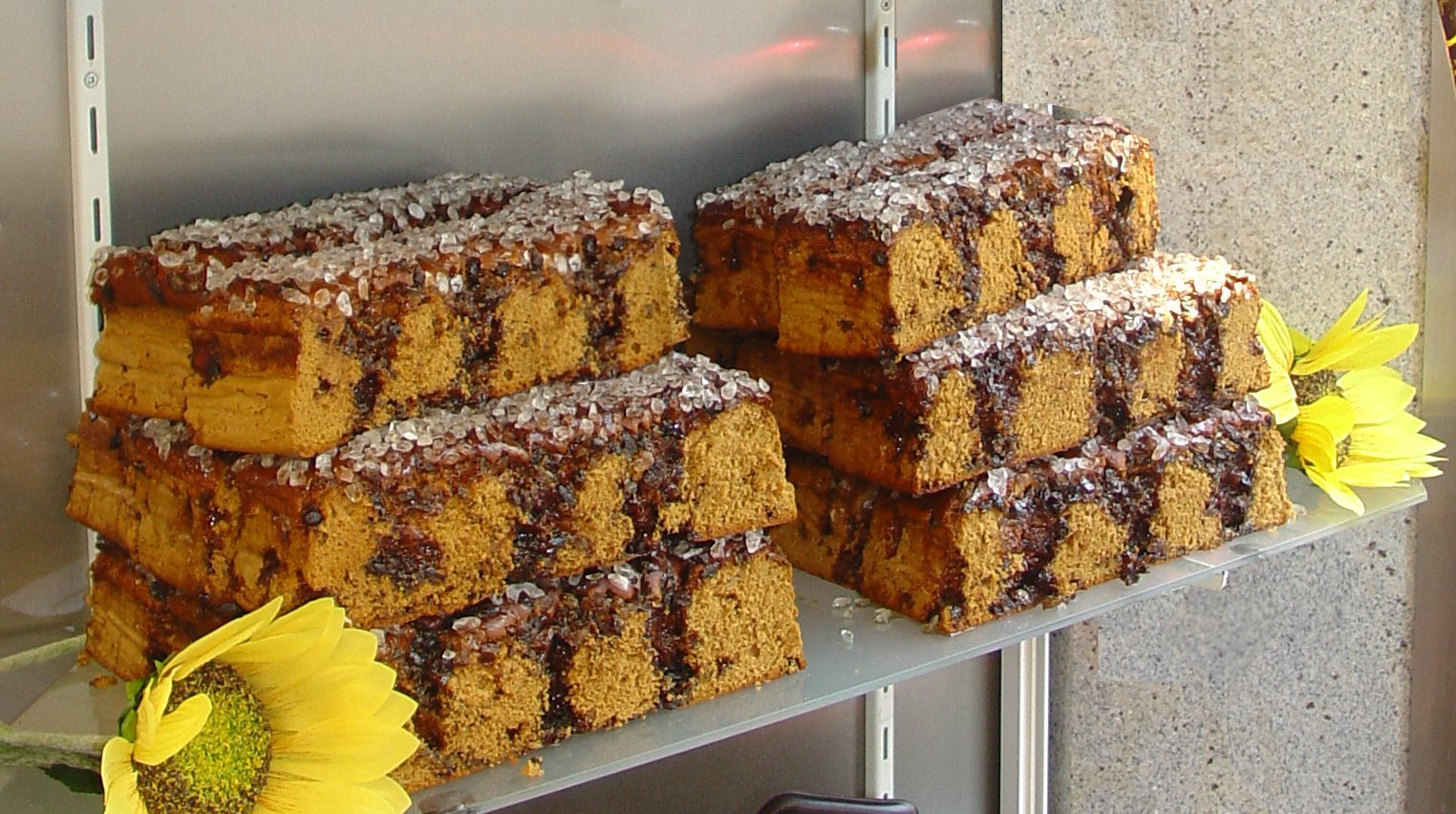
The Dutch Carnival Cake

The Dutch Carnival Cake, also known as 'Carnival Cake' (Dutch: Kermiskoek), is traditionally a Dutch dessert that is similar to gingerbread cake. The traditional recipe include a variety of ingredients, among which are freshly harvested rye flour and honey from the Betuwe region. The cake is additionally enriched with rock candy.

== History ==
Back in 1871 Jan ter Gouw already described the Carnival Cake in his book Folk Amusement (Volksvermaken). From this book the following song originated:

“Jan, just buy me a Cake! Pretty girl, I've got no money”

Historically, the Dutch Carnival Cake was made solely in October for the autumn carnival of Tiel. It used to be given as a wedding proposal present, in which a farmer's son would gift a Carnival Cake to his partner. If the girl gave him a slice of the cake on the eighth or fourteenth day after the proposal, they would get engaged. If she did not offer a slice of the cake, it meant that she declined his proposal. Nowadays the offering of 'the lovecake' is not a proposal anymore, but a token of love and appreciation between partners, family and friends.

There is still a Dutch bakery that produces the Carnival Cake, and so the tradition is being continued.

== Recognition ==
The Carnival Cake has a rich tradition, which sunk into oblivion over time. However, because the Carnival Cake was adopted in the list of the Centre for Folklife and Cultural Heritage - a countrywide organization similar to UNESCO - the tradition can be maintained. Since this tradition was adopted, the original Dutch Carnival cake is procurable all year long.

== See also ==
- Applesauce cake
- List of cakes
