= Wine cake =

Cake made with wine in Colombian cuisine

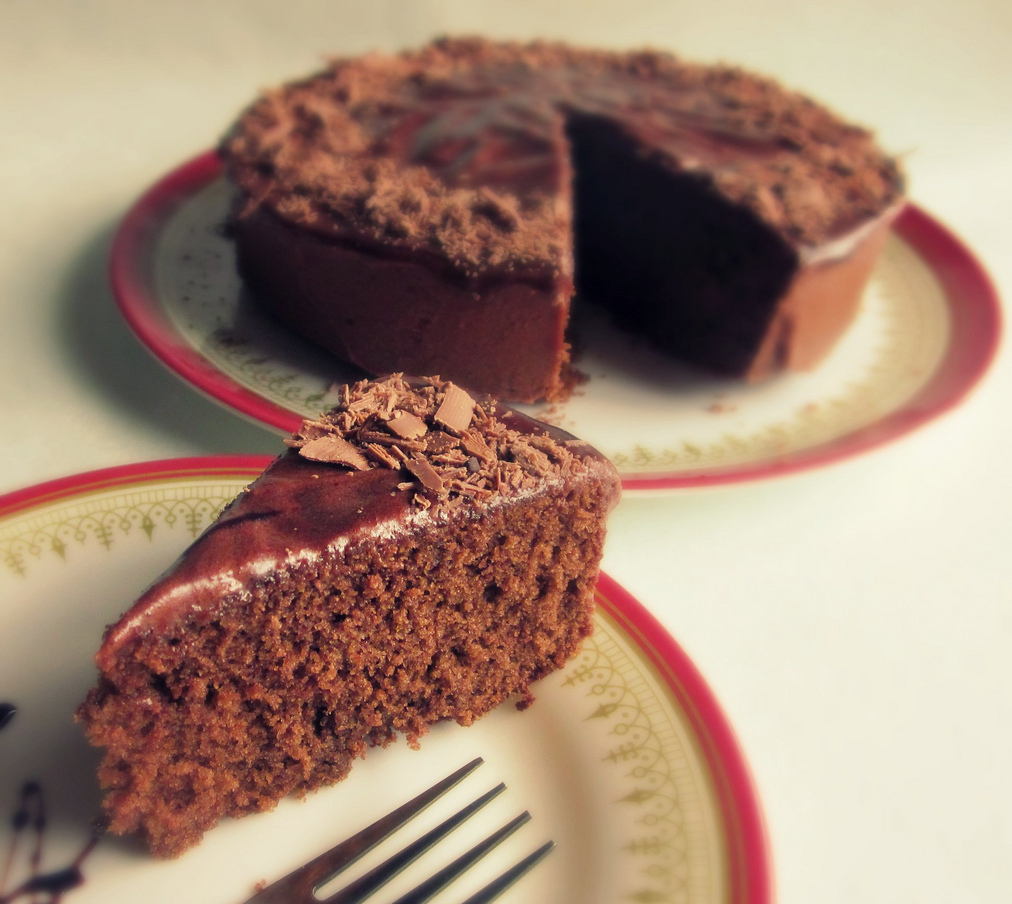
- One type of cake
- Alternative names: Black cake
- Type: Cake
- Place of origin: Colombia
- Main ingredients: Sugar, butter, eggs, flour, baking powder, spices, vanilla extract, baker's caramel or molasses; wine, rum, prunes, raisins, chopped candied figs.

Wine cake, known in Spanish as torta envinada, is a cake made with wine in Colombian cuisine. It is known by various names such, as wine cake, black cake, and torta negra envinada in Spanish.

== Variations ==
Torta negra (Colombian black cake) and Bizcocho Negro (Colombian black sponge cake) are similar cakes with varying ingredients (raisins, candied fruit, and rum).

There are numerous variations on traditional pound cake, with certain countries and regions having distinctive styles. These can include the addition of flavoring agents (such as vanilla extract, among others), or fruit (raisins, dates, etc.), as well as alterations to the original recipe to change the characteristics of the resulting cake. For instance, baking soda or baking powder may be incorporated to induce leavening during baking.

Also known in Spanish as Ponqué (from the English "Pound cake"), in Colombia, Ecuador and Venezuela. A sponge cake, usually large and round, that can be filled with fruit, cream, etc.

== See also ==
- Rum cake
