= Apple cake =

Cakes made with apples

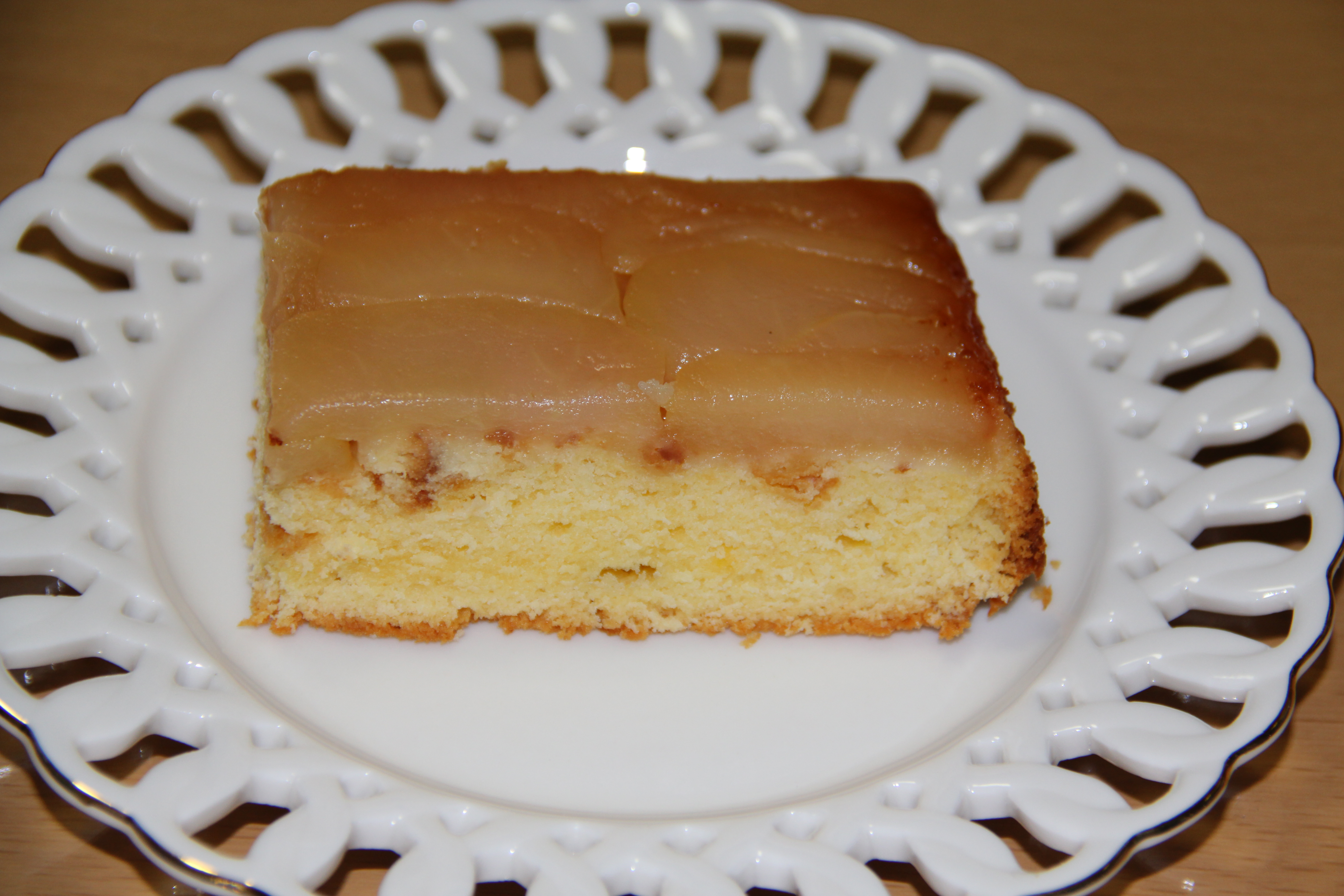
- Apple cake
- Course: Dessert, Snack
- Main ingredients: Flour, butter, sugar, apples

Apple cakes are cakes in which apples feature as a main flavour and ingredient. These cakes incorporate apples in a variety of forms, including diced, pureed, or stewed, and can feature common additions like raisins, nuts, and 'sweet' spices such as cinnamon or nutmeg. They are a common and popular dessert worldwide, thanks to millennia of apple cultivation in Asia and Europe, and their widespread introduction and propagation throughout the Americas during the Columbian Exchange and colonisation. As a result, apple desserts, including cakes, have a huge number of variations.

Apples are also used in other cakes to add moisture and sweetness, often as a partial substitute for refined sugar.

== Varieties ==
=== British & Irish ===
Regions of Great Britain and Ireland have the ideal climate for apple growing, making apple cake a common dessert with many regional varieties throughout. However, it is in the traditionally agricultural West Country of England that apple cakes have been raised as culinary symbols of their counties, such as Dorset apple cake, Devonshire apple cake, and Somerset apple cake. A recipe for Dorset apple cake was recorded in the Bridport News on 27 November 1896. Cider cakes originate from the South West and Herefordshire, with various versions incorporating the alcoholic apple based beverage either in the cake batter or steeping the fruit inside the cake. The Irish apple cake is different from their English counterparts, in that slices of apple are sandwich within the sponge mixture. The Welsh apple cake, Tiesen Faa and can be eaten as with a cup of tea or as a dessert with custard or cream, while the Welsh Harvest cake resembles the Irish apple cake but has the addition of sultanas and cinnamon. On Guernsey, they have a suet based apple cake called Gâche Melée.

=== German ===
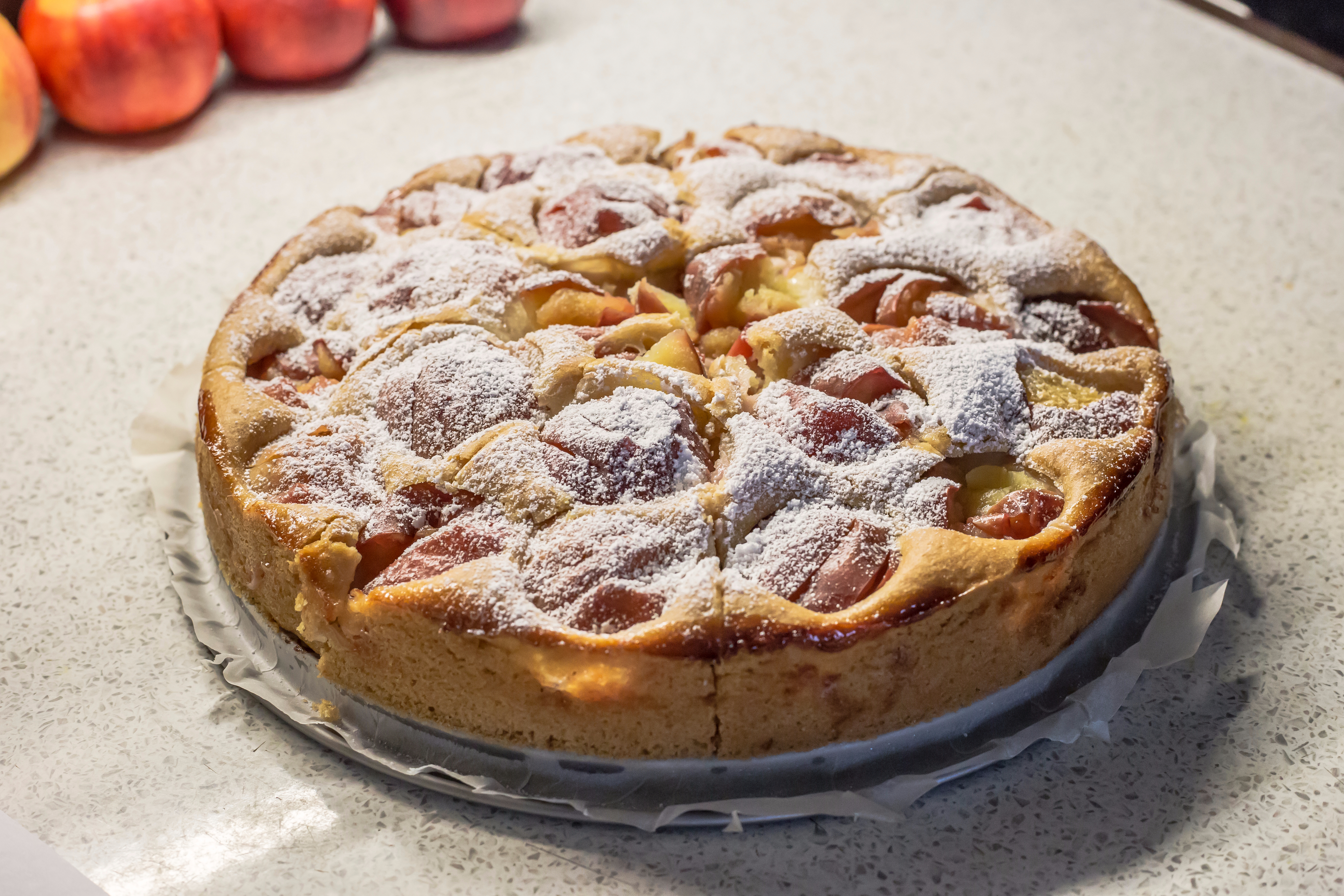
German style "sunken" apple cake

Apple is a common fruit in German baking. The Versunkener Apfelkuchen (sunken apple cake) is an apple cake that has apples halves, usually peeled and hasselbacked, sunk into the sponge cake batter. Apfelkuchen mit Hefeteig (apple cake with yeast dough) combines apples with a rich yeast dough, like a traditional coffee cake. Apfelstreuselkuchen (apple streusel cake) is a sheet cake with apples and streusel over the top. An Unsichtbarer Apfelkuchen (invisible apple cake) pairs a large volume of thinly sliced apples with just enough thin batter to retain the shape of the cake after baking.

=== Polish ===
An apple cake or pie of any kind in Poland is generically called jabłecznik. In colloquial speech, the term is often used interchangeably with szarlotka, though strictly speaking the latter only describes a specific (albeit most popular) kind of jabłecznik in the form of an apple pie. Commercial vendors on the other hand often contrast jabłecznik with szarlotka,, in which case it will typically describe a cake made from a sponge or yeast-based dough with a spiced apple filling. It can be topped with kruszonka (crumbles), meringue, or a dusting of caster (powdered) sugar. An additional layer of budyń (a Polish variation of custard) can sometimes be found. In restaurants and cafes, it is usually served hot with whipped cream and coffee.

=== Scandinavian ===
In Scandinavia, apple cakes are typically prepared from sour apples and baked in a dough made from sugar, butter, flour, eggs, and baking powder. The cake is then topped with apples, cinnamon and sugar, sometimes also chopped almonds. Apple crumble pie is also common. In Sweden and Norway it is usually served tepid with whipped cream, custard (vanilla sauce) or vanilla ice cream.

In Denmark, gammeldags æblekage (old-fashioned apple cake) can also refer to dessert assembled in layers of cooked and mashed apples and sugar, sweetened crumbs (often crushed macarons) and topped with whipped cream

== See also ==
- Applesauce cake
- Apple pie
- List of apple dishes
- List of cakes
- List of Polish dishes
