= Bolo de mel =

Traditional cake from the Madeira Islands

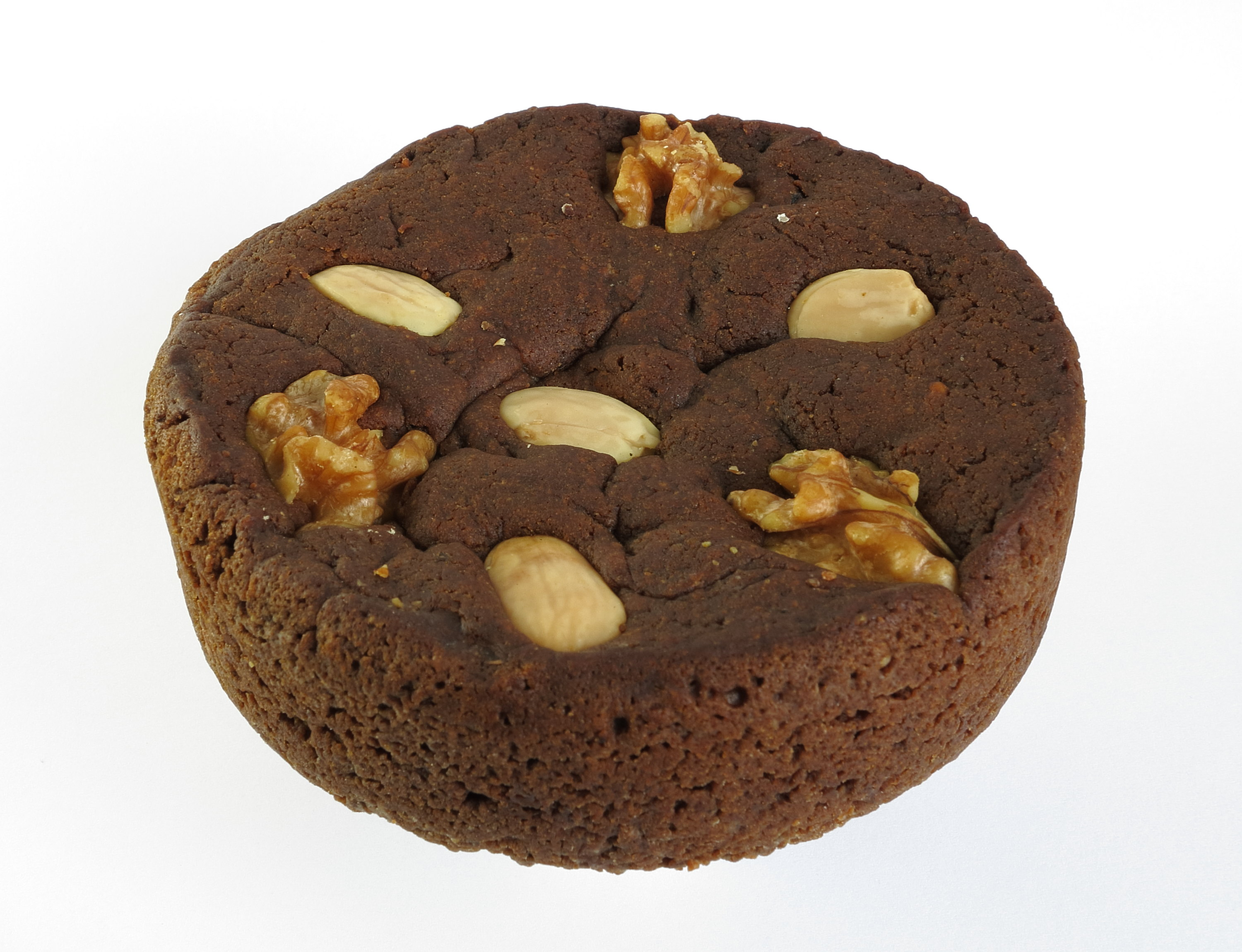
- Alternative names: Bolo de mel de cana
- Type: Cake
- Place of origin: Portugal
- Region or state: Madeira
- Created by: Santa Clara nuns
- Main ingredients: Flour, sugar, butter or margarine, lard, molasses or honey, walnuts, almonds, spices

Bolo de mel (Portuguese pronunciation: [ˈbolu ðɨ ˈmɛl], "honey cake") is a traditional cake from the Madeira Islands.

== History ==
This cake is considered to be Madeira's oldest dessert. First noted in the 15th century using spices from Europe and India, it was first created by nuns in the Convent of Santa Clara in Funchal. It is also popular in the Azores Islands of Portugal.

== Ingredients ==
The bolo de mel cake became a popular confection when the island was an important sugar producer, since the cake itself is traditionally made with molasses instead of the now-popular honey, which meant it could be stored for up to 5 years. When made with molasses, the cake is very dark in color and has a spongy sticky texture resembling a soft cookie. The cake often has walnuts and almonds mixed within it. Clove, cinnamon, black pepper, anise seeds and allspice are popular spices used in the preparation. When it is served in Madeira, it is customary not to cut the cake, but rather to tear pieces off using the hands.

Bolo de mel is traditionally made around 8 December so that it will be consumed during Christmas often in a large enough batch that it can be enjoyed throughout the year.

== See also ==
- List of cakes
- Madeira cake
- Broa de mel
