= Better than sex cake =

Pineapple and coconut cake

Better than sex cake is a cake baked using yellow cake mix, with a juicy pineapple center, covered with layers of vanilla pudding and sweetened whipped cream, and sprinkled with coconut flakes. A variant using chocolate cake mix, caramel topping, and crumbled toffee is known by similar names, such as better than Robert Redford cake.

The cake's moist center is typically created by inserting a fork into the cake several times and filling the holes with a mixture containing sugar and pineapple in its juice. It is traditionally baked using a 9x13" cake pan and then refrigerated and eaten cold. The cake was featured by Paula Deen on her series Paula's Home Cooking.

== Variations ==
The cake's popularity was spreading on the west coast of Florida and in Charlotte, North Carolina, when it came to the attention of the 1981 St. Louis annual convention of the Newspaper Food Editors and Writers Association. It was published as a pair of dessert recipes, with the other one from Indianapolis called "next best thing to Robert Redford" and featuring layers of chopped pecans, cream cheese, chocolate pudding, and whipped cream, with grated chocolate candy bar sprinkled on top.

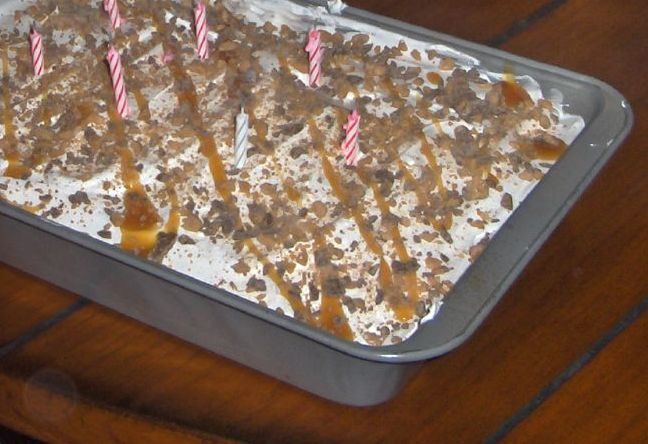
A variant topped with caramel and crumbled chocolate-coated toffee bars

By 1990, several versions existed. The basic recipe for the cake was altered depending on the tastes of the person making the cake, and alternatives include chocolate, banana, or candy flavors. A 1998 Kansas variant used chocolate cake mix, sweetened condensed milk, caramel ice cream topping, and crumbled toffee. The less-explicit "better than Robert Redford" name came to be applied to both variants.

=== Pudding version ===
The fanciful names for this cake can overlap with the names for a non-cake layered dessert called chocolate delight. Chocolate delight has a crumbly crust (rather than a cake) on the bottom and is topped with several chilled layers, usually a sweet cream cheese layer topped by chocolate pudding and then covered in Cool Whip and drizzled with chocolate syrup. Names for chocolate delight include "Better Than Paul Newman", "Next Best Thing to Robert Redford", and "Sex in a Pan", among others.

== Name ==
The name changed over time and across contexts, such as Holy Cow cake. The chocolate version was sometimes later called Better Than Tom Selleck cake.

In the 1950s, "better than sex" was a slang term signifying approval.

Because of the name, the cake has been recommended for sexually themed events, such as bachelorette parties.

== See also ==
- List of cakes
