= Merveilleux (dessert) =

Belgian meringue dessert

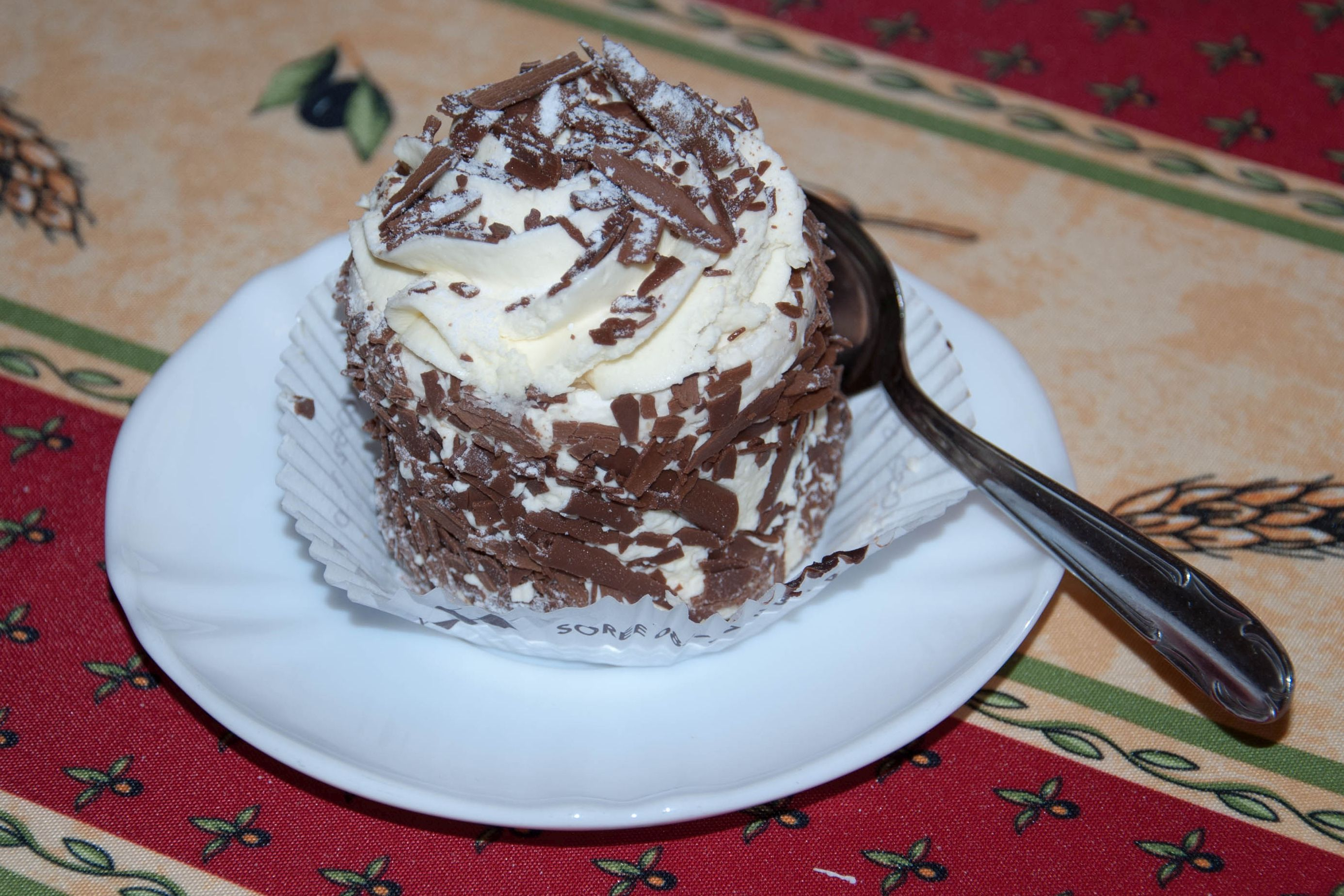
A merveilleux cake

The merveilleux (marvelous) is a small cake that originated in Belgium and is now found in France and some U.S. cities. It consists of a sandwich of two light meringues welded with whipped cream which has been covered with whipped cream and dusted with chocolate shavings. A candied cherry sometimes decorates the cake.

The confectioner and chocolatier Pierre Marcolini developed his own version, as did the French confectioner Frédéric Vaucamps, and Etty Benhamou of Le Mervetty. Vaucamp named each of his variations using comparable adjectives: impensable (unthinkable) for coffee, excentrique (eccentric) for cherry, and magnifique (magnificent) for praline. He also used names derived from the association of the word merveilleux with French fashion of the late 18th century: sans-culotte for caramel. His incroyable, which uses speculoos cream and white chocolate shavings, translates as unbelievable but is also a term paired with merveilleux in French fashion.

In various French provinces, the "boule choco", "boule meringuée au chocolat" or "arlequin" uses chocolate butter cream in place of whipped cream and the cake is completely surrounded by chocolate chips and takes the shape of a ball.

== See also ==
- List of cakes
- Angel pie, an American dessert pie made with a meringue shell
- Incroyables and Merveilleuses, French fashion trend, 1795–1799
