= Kornigou =

Brioche in the shape of antlers

- Type: Brioche
- Main ingredients: Fruit, spices

Kornigou, also known as kornik, were unsweetened brioche made of wheat flour formed in a triangular shape reminiscent of a mitre or square cap, possibly in the style of the first bishop of Cornouaille, a historic province of Brittany. It was not a popular dessert; by 1880, it was only sold by two bakers in Guilers on the feast day of St Corentin. The kornigou were possibly shaped in the style of St Corentin's hair.
