= Applesauce cake =

Dessert

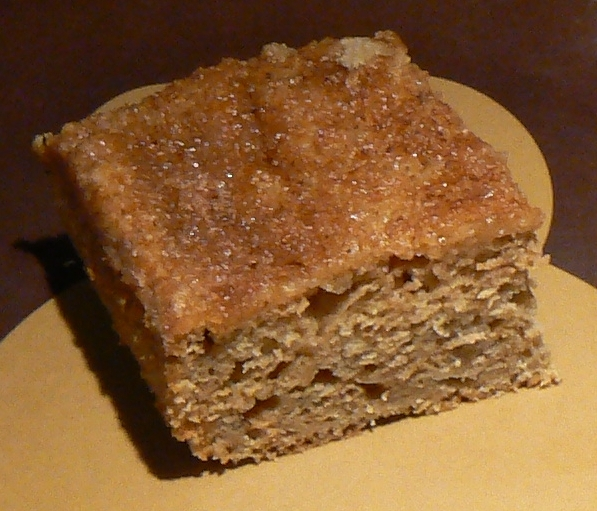
Applesauce cake with a cinnamon and sugar topping

Applesauce cake is a dessert cake prepared using apple sauce, flour and sugar as primary ingredients. Various spices are typically used, and it tends to be a moist cake. Several additional ingredients may also be used in its preparation, and it is sometimes prepared and served as a coffee cake. The cake dates back to early colonial times in the United States. National Applesauce Cake Day occurs annually on June 6 in the U.S.

== History ==
The preparation of applesauce cake dates back to early colonial times in the New England Colonies of the northeastern United States. From 1900 to the 1950s, recipes for applesauce cake frequently appeared in American cookbooks. In the United States, National Applesauce Cake Day occurs annually on June 6.

== Ingredients and preparation ==
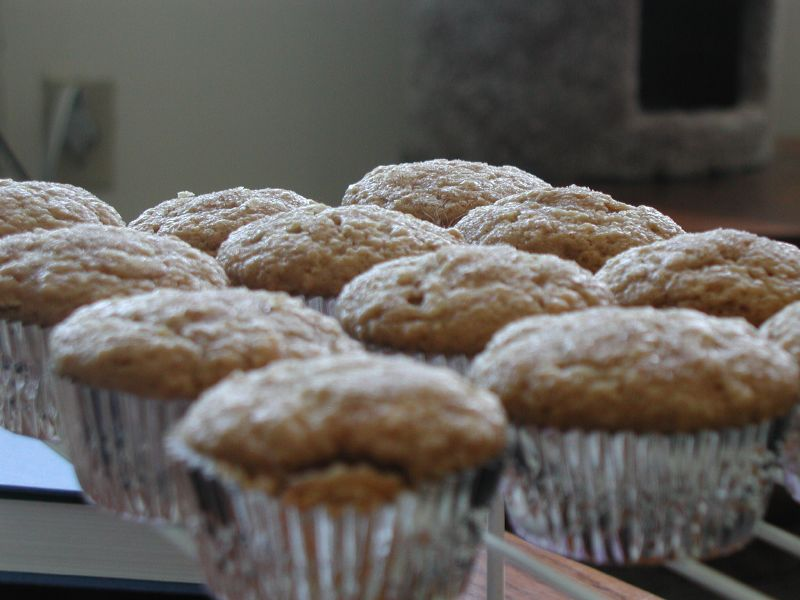
Applesauce cupcakes

Applesauce cake is a dessert cake prepared using apple sauce, flour and sugar as main ingredients. Store-bought or homemade applesauce may be used in its preparation. Additional ingredients include eggs, butter, margarine or oil, raisins, dates, chopped apple, chopped nuts (such as walnuts and pecans), cocoa powder, and spices such as cinnamon, cloves, nutmeg and allspice. Some versions include dried or fresh, finely grated ginger. After baking, applesauce cake is sometimes topped with an icing, frosting or glaze, such as a caramel glaze. It also may be served topped with a dusting of confectioner's sugar or whipped cream. Gluten-free applesauce cake can be prepared using rice flour. Egg-free applesauce cake can be made by using an egg substitute.

Applesauce cake tends to be moist due to the liquid content present in the apple sauce. However, using a chunky-style apple sauce can result in a cake with less moisture than from using standard apple-sauce. Letting it sit for one or two days before serving can increase its flavor, (Note: "Like most cakes of this type, it tastes even better when allowed to sit a day or two, and it will keep well and stay moist for up to a week when wrapped properly.") (Note: "... the cake is better after the first day, and keeps well.") as this allows time for the ingredients to intermingle within the cake.

It can be prepared using various types of cake pans, such as a ring-shaped bundt cake using a bundt pan, in loaf form using a loaf pan, or as a sheet cake with a sheet cake pan. Applesauce cake is sometimes prepared in the form of cupcakes.

== Variations ==
Applesauce cake may be prepared and served as a type of coffee cake, which may include a sweet crumb topping. Simple versions may be prepared using prepared coffee cake mix, apple sauce, and other various ingredients. Fruits such as blueberries, cranberries and raisins may also be used in applesauce coffee cake.

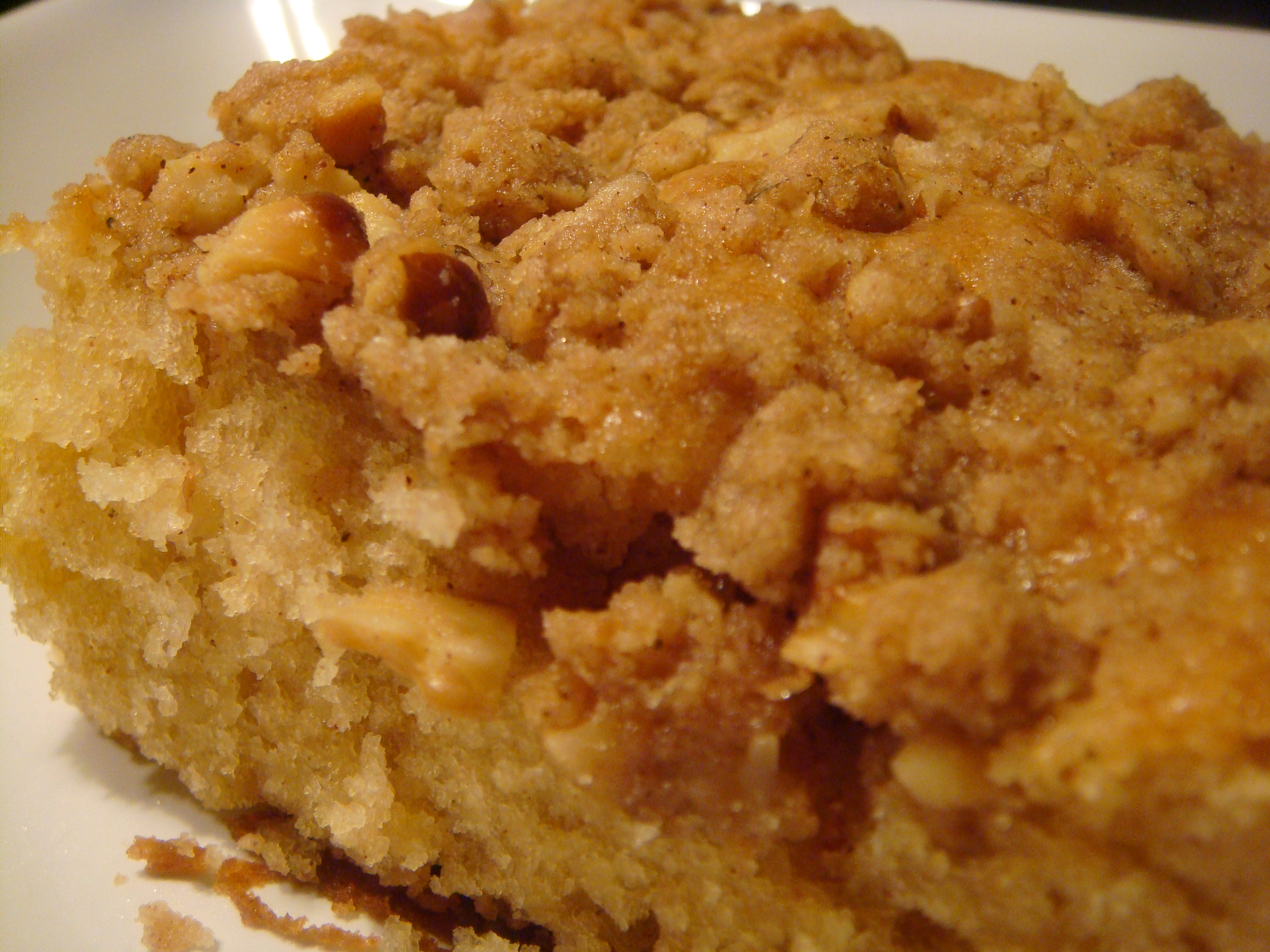
A close-up view of applesauce walnut coffee cake

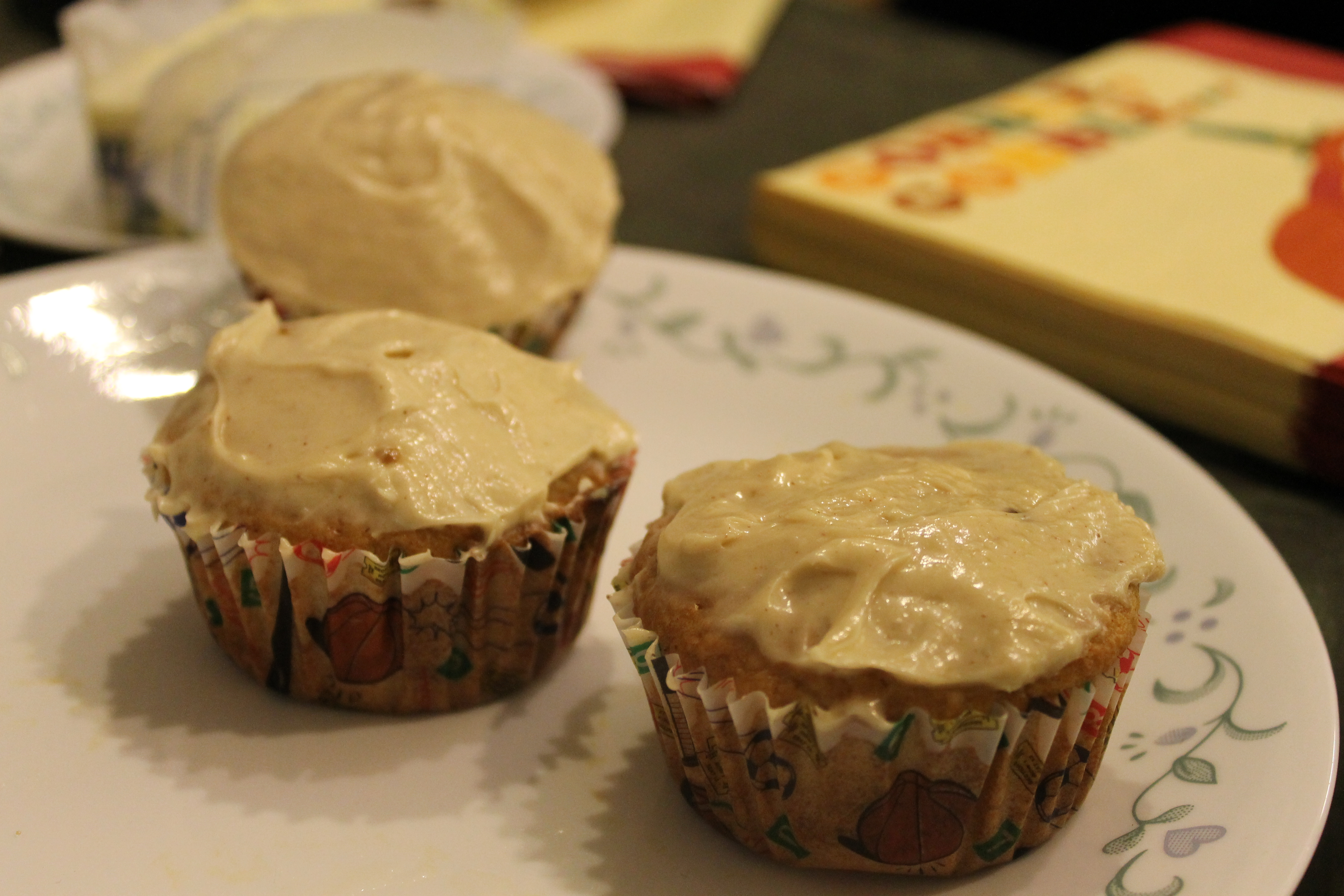
Applesauce cupcakes with icing

== See also ==
- Apple cake
- Apple pie
- List of apple dishes
- List of cakes
- List of desserts
