= Gâteau magique =

French triple-layered cake

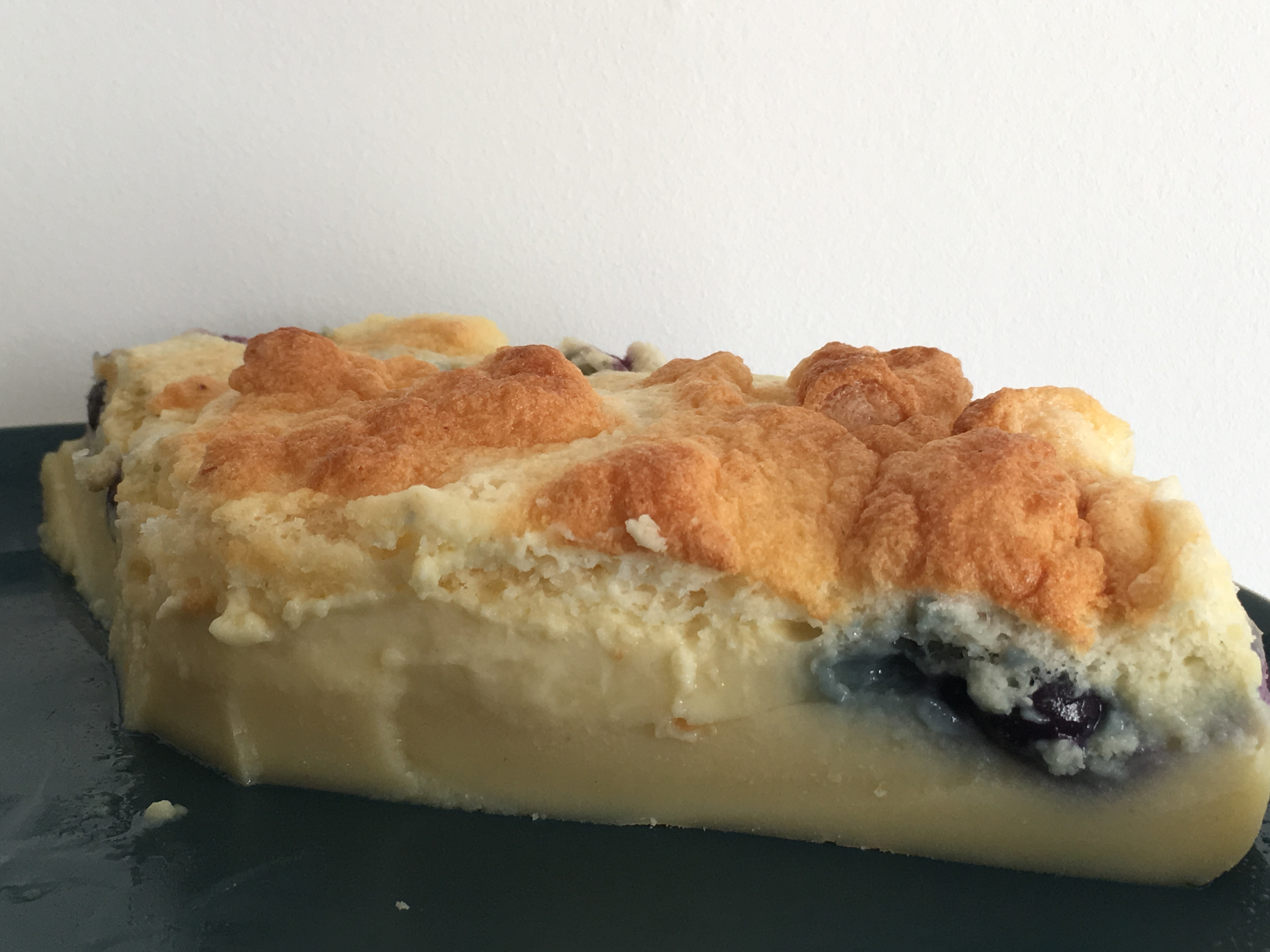
- Gâteau magique with blueberries
- Alternative names: Magic cake
- Type: Cake
- Course: Dessert
- Place of origin: France
- Main ingredients: Flour, sugar, butter, eggs, vanilla, milk

A gâteau magique (also sometimes referred to as magic cake in English) is a French cake that forms three layers when the batter is baked. The bottom layer is fudge-like, the middle layer is custard and the top layer is a sponge.

== History ==
The dish most likely stems from millasson or millas, a dessert originating from the south-west of France, made from millet flour and cornflour. Two layers form whilst the millasson is cooked, one being a custard layer and the other being a genoise layer, due to the mixing of sugar and eggs.

== Preparation ==
The cake contains vanilla, eggs, milk, butter, flour, powdered sugar, salt and water. The batter is liquid when it is placed into the oven and is cooked for around fifty minutes in a 160 °C (320 °F) oven. After it has been cooked, the top of the cake is golden and the middle wobbles slightly. It is placed in the fridge for two hours and then eaten cold.
