= Gorgon cake =

Chinese dessert

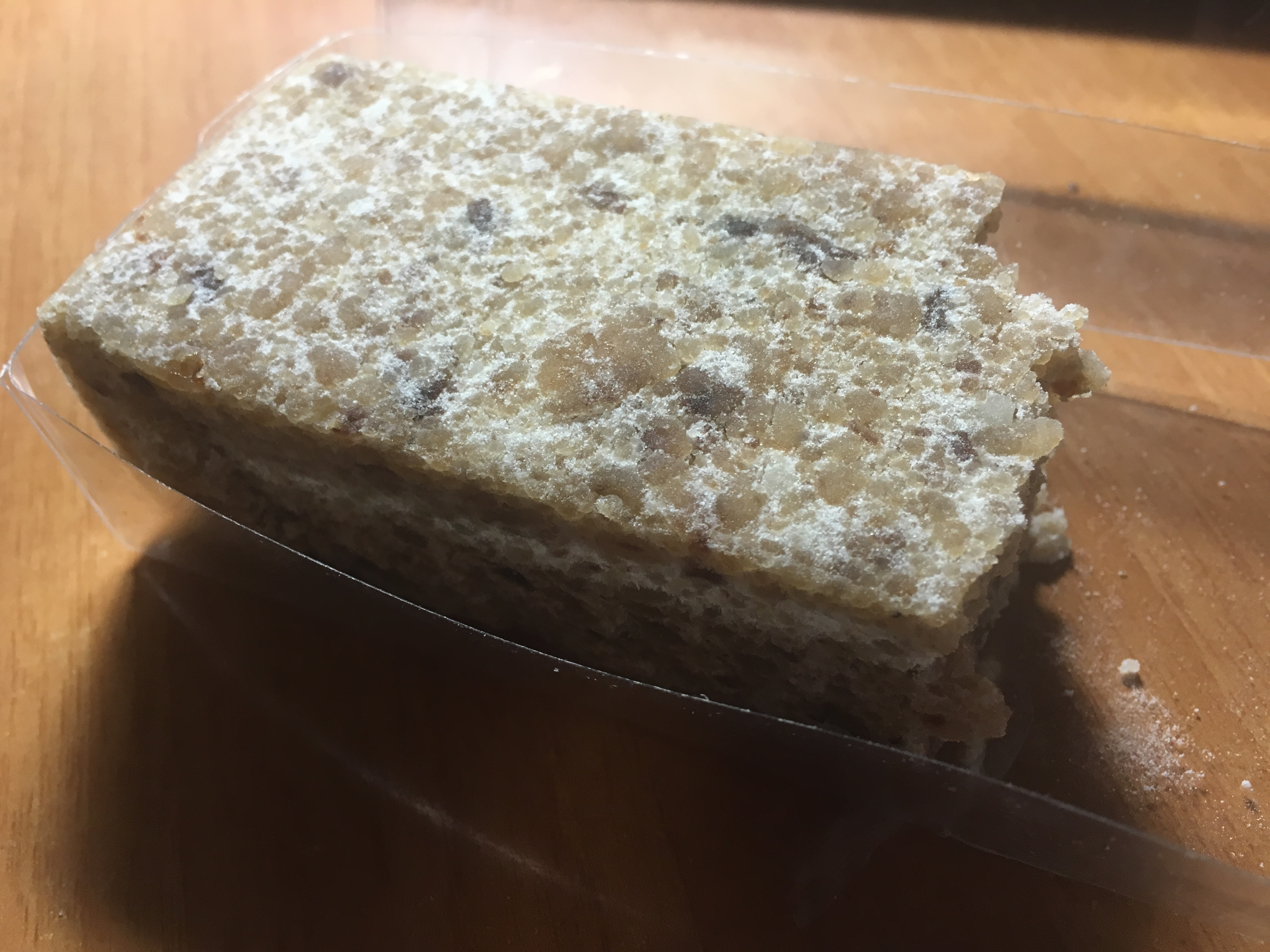
Gorgon euryale seed cake

Gorgon euryale seed cake (Chinese: 芡實糕; pinyin: qiànshí gāo) is a kind of Chinese dessert made from the gorgon fruit (Euryale ferox) seeds. It originated from the Xitang town of Jiashan County, Zhejiang. It is said to taste sweet and chewy.

== Preparation ==
The ingredients of the dessert include fresh gorgon fruit, sweet rice flour, and sugar. The gorgon fruit is boiled, dried in the sun and levigated. The resulting product is mixed with sweet rice flour, sugar and water. This dough is kneaded, compressed into rectangular shapes, and steamed.

The gorgon cake is said to tonify spleen and kidney.
