= Rum cake =

Type of dessert

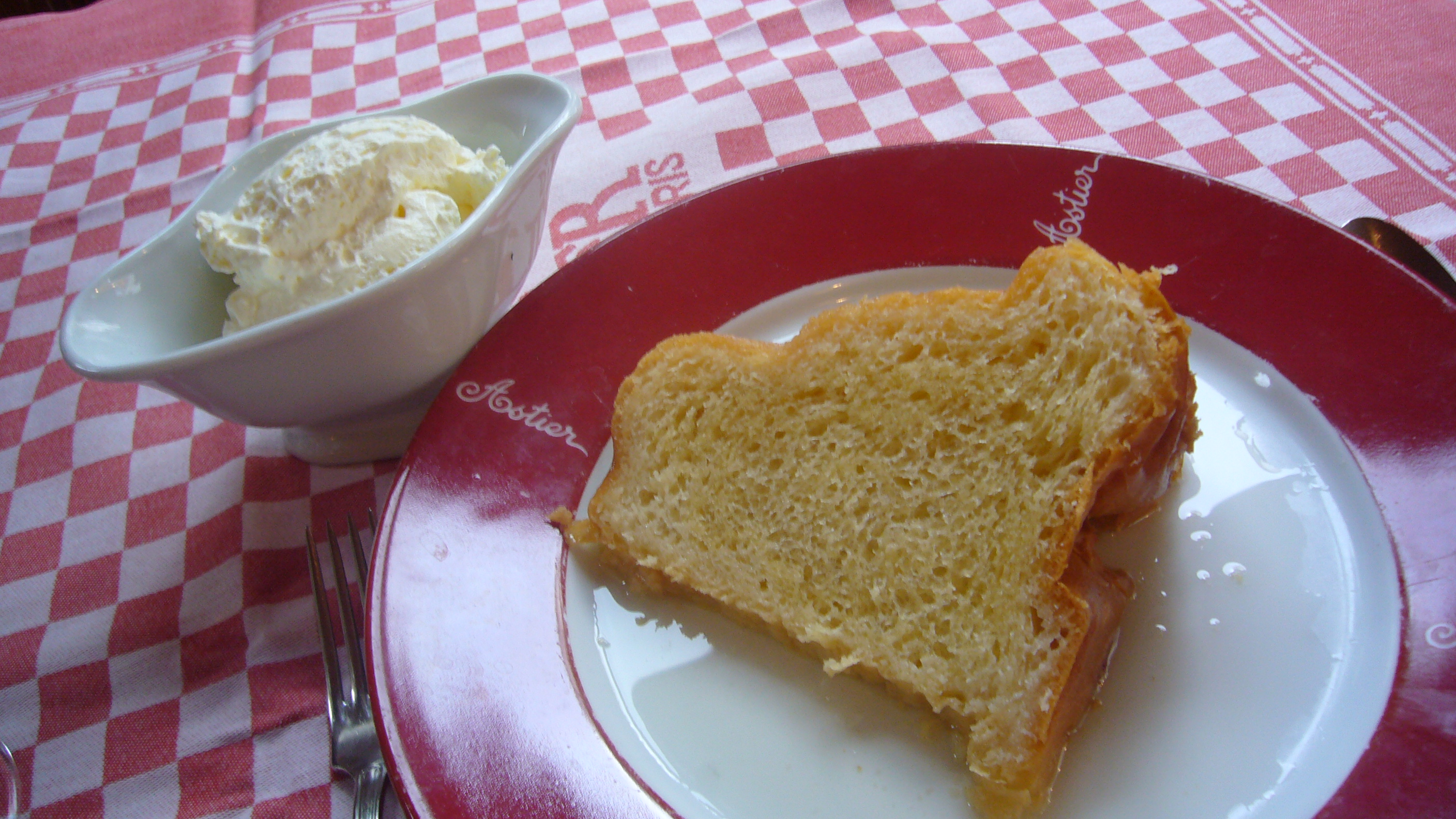
- A slice of rum cake
- Type: Cake
- Course: Dessert
- Region or state: Caribbean
- Main ingredients: flour, rum, sugar, spices, eggs, and butter
- Variations: Dried fruit, Candied fruit, almonds and walnuts

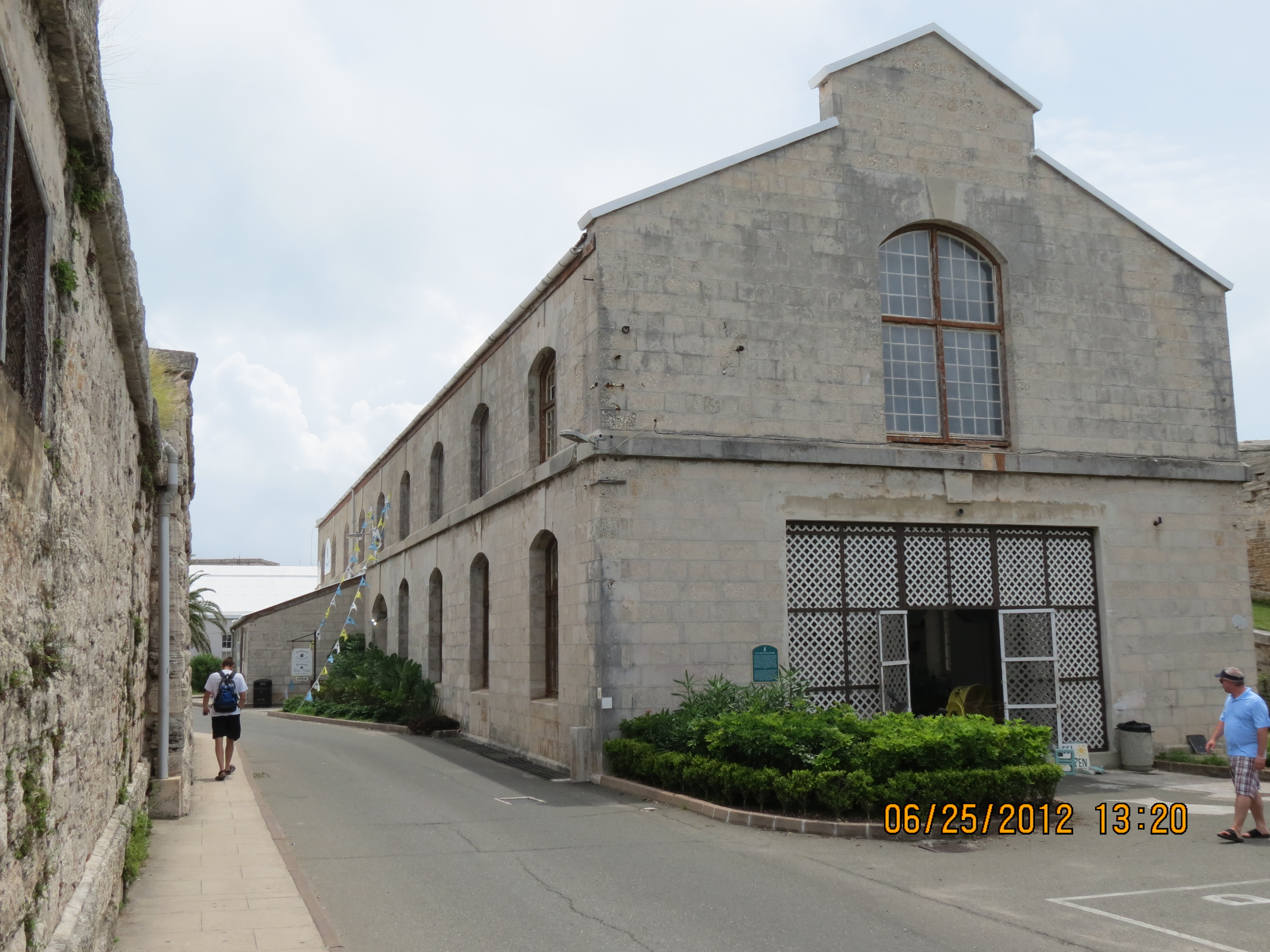
Rum Cake factory in Bermuda

A rum cake or black cake is a type of dessert cake which contains rum. In most of the Caribbean, rum cakes are a traditional holiday season dessert, descended from the holiday puddings (such as figgy pudding). Traditionally, dried fruit is soaked in rum for months and then added to dough prepared with sugar which has been caramelized by boiling in water. The result, also known as "black cake", is similar to a fruitcake, with a lighter texture.

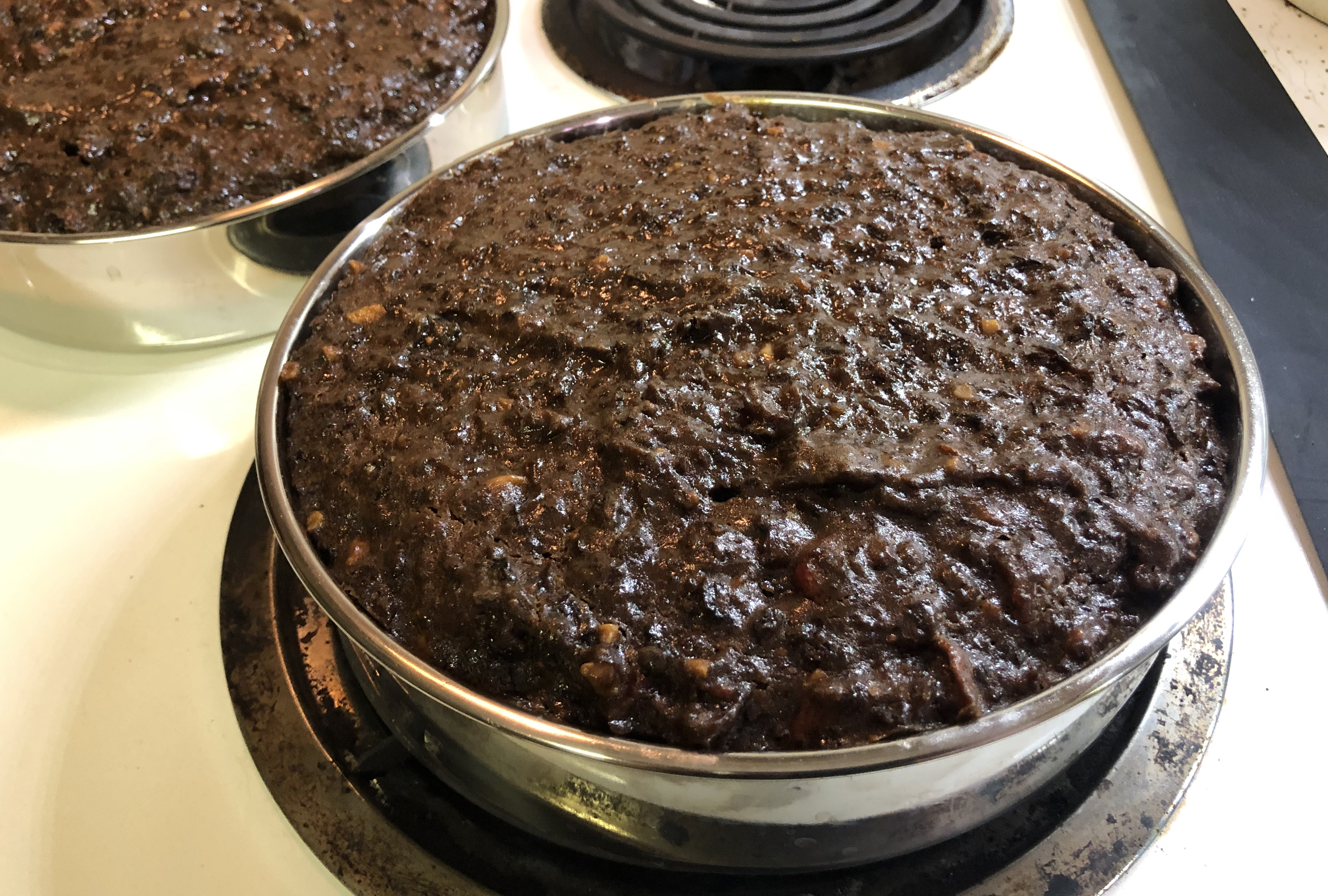
Trinidad and Tobago-style black cake

In Guyana, Trinidad and Tobago, Jamaica and other parts of the Caribbean, fruits are preserved in cherry brandy or rum to be used in the making of black cake. Black cake is traditionally associated with Christmas and weddings in Guyana, Jamaica, and Trinidad and Tobago.

On the mainland United States, rum cakes have been popular since at least the 1970s. While many island travelers go out of their way to pick up a Caribbean variety, more and more small U.S. companies are competing, much the way that craft beers are competing with the large beer manufacturers. Some offer baked-to-order rum cakes. Some infuse the rum directly into their cakes (instead of glazing). Many appear to have a decades-old special recipe. In Puerto Rico, rum cake is called Bizcocho de Ron, and is a sponge cake, so as to absorb the rum. If fruit is added to it, it is fresh or dried. Raisins and sultanas may be soaked in rum for one day or one night. Bizcochos de Ron are given as gifts during the holiday season.

It is possible to become intoxicated from consumption of an excessive amount of rum cake, and some rum cakes contain even more than five percent of certain grain alcohols, though some are made to consistently contain less than 0.5% alcohol. It is typically made with plums and raisins soaked in rum, as well as brown sugar and a bittersweet caramel called "browning".

== See also ==
- Gâteau nantais
- Rum baba
