= Madeira cake =

British sponge cake

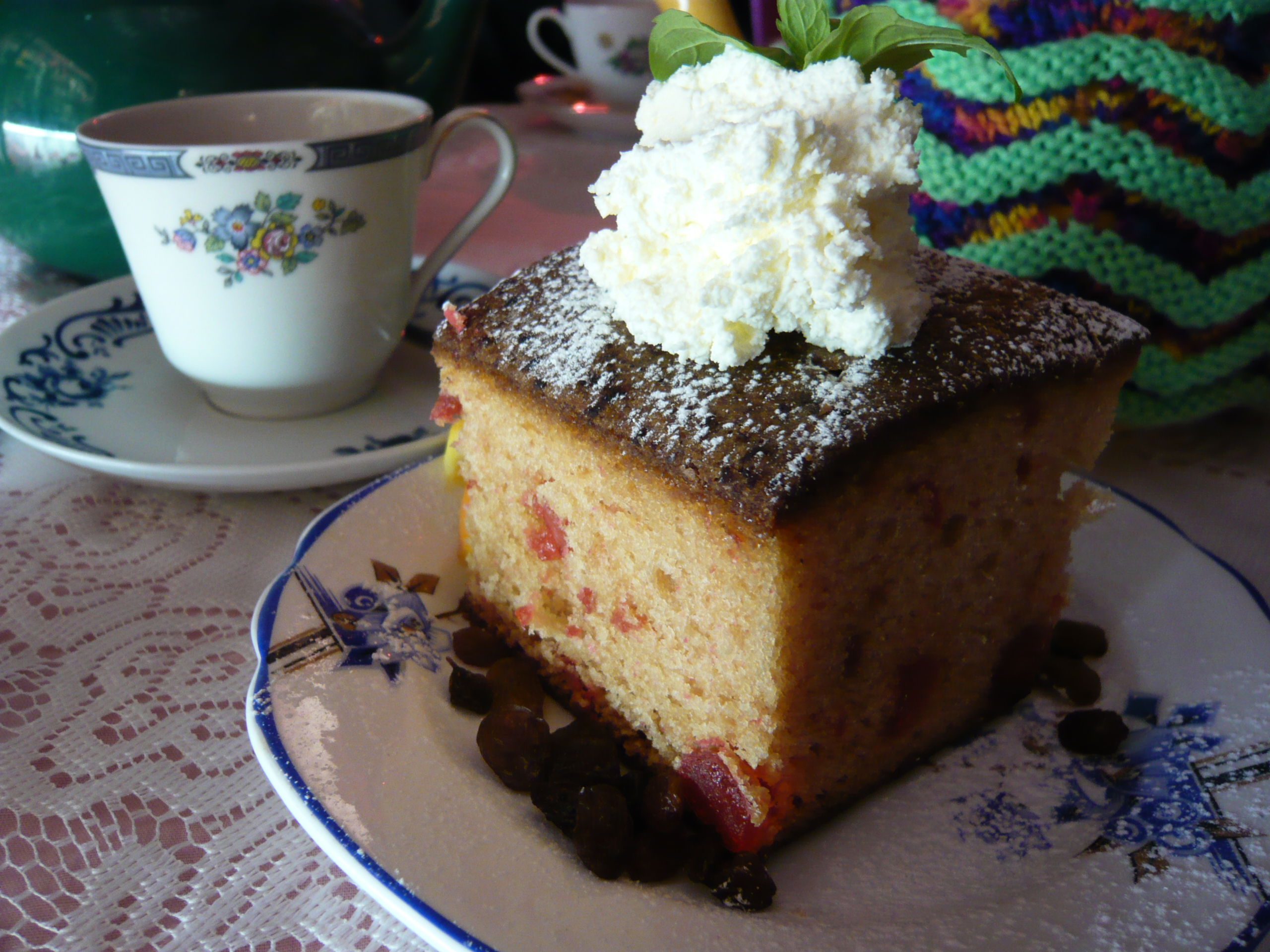
- Cherry Madeira cake with whipped cream and tea
- Type: Sponge cake
- Course: Tea or breakfast
- Place of origin: England

Madeira cake is a sponge or butter cake in traditional English cookery.

== Origin ==
It is sometimes mistakenly thought to originate from the Madeira Islands but was in fact named after Madeira wine from the islands, popular in England in the mid-1800s and often served with the cake. Madeirans produce their own traditional cake – bolo de mel, dark, spicy and honey-flavoured – which is very different.

== Cake ==
The cake has a firm yet light texture. It is eaten with tea or (occasionally) for breakfast and is traditionally flavoured with lemon. Nowadays, the English Madeira cake is often served with tea or liqueurs. Dating back to an original recipe in the 18th or 19th century, Madeira cake is similar to a pound cake or yellow cake. One of the earliest published recipes was by Eliza Acton in her Modern Cookery for Private Families (1845):

A Good Madeira Cake: Whisk four fresh eggs until they are as light as possible, then, continuing still to whisk them, throw by slow degrees the following ingredients in the order in which they are written: six ounces of dry pounded and sifted sugar; six of flour, also dried and sifted; four ounces of butter just dissolved, but not heated; the rind of a fresh lemon; and the instant before the cake is moulded beat well in the third of a teaspoonful of carbonate of soda: bake an hour in a moderate oven.
