= Cardinal slice =

Austrian layered meringue cake

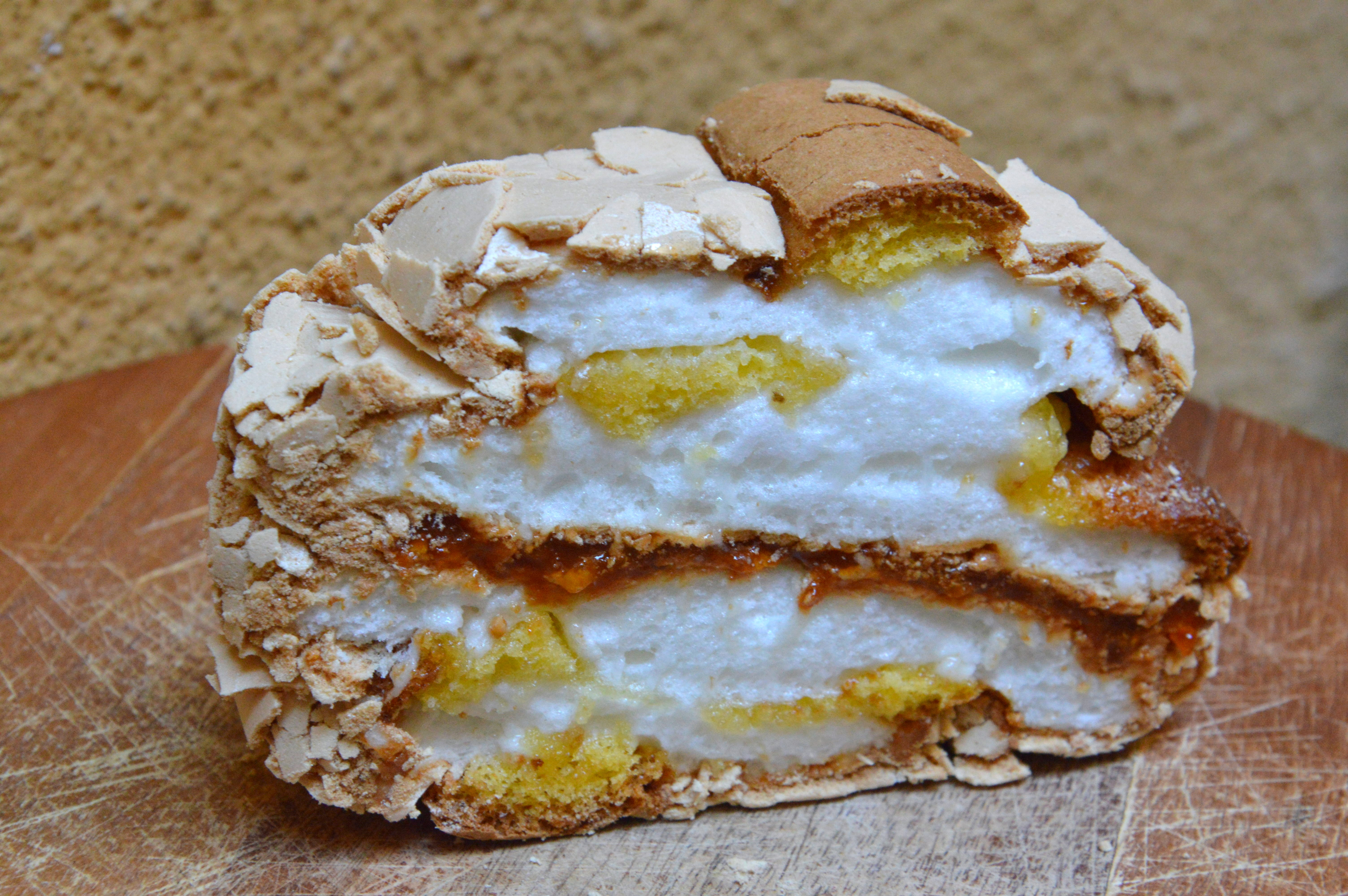
Cross section of cardinal slice

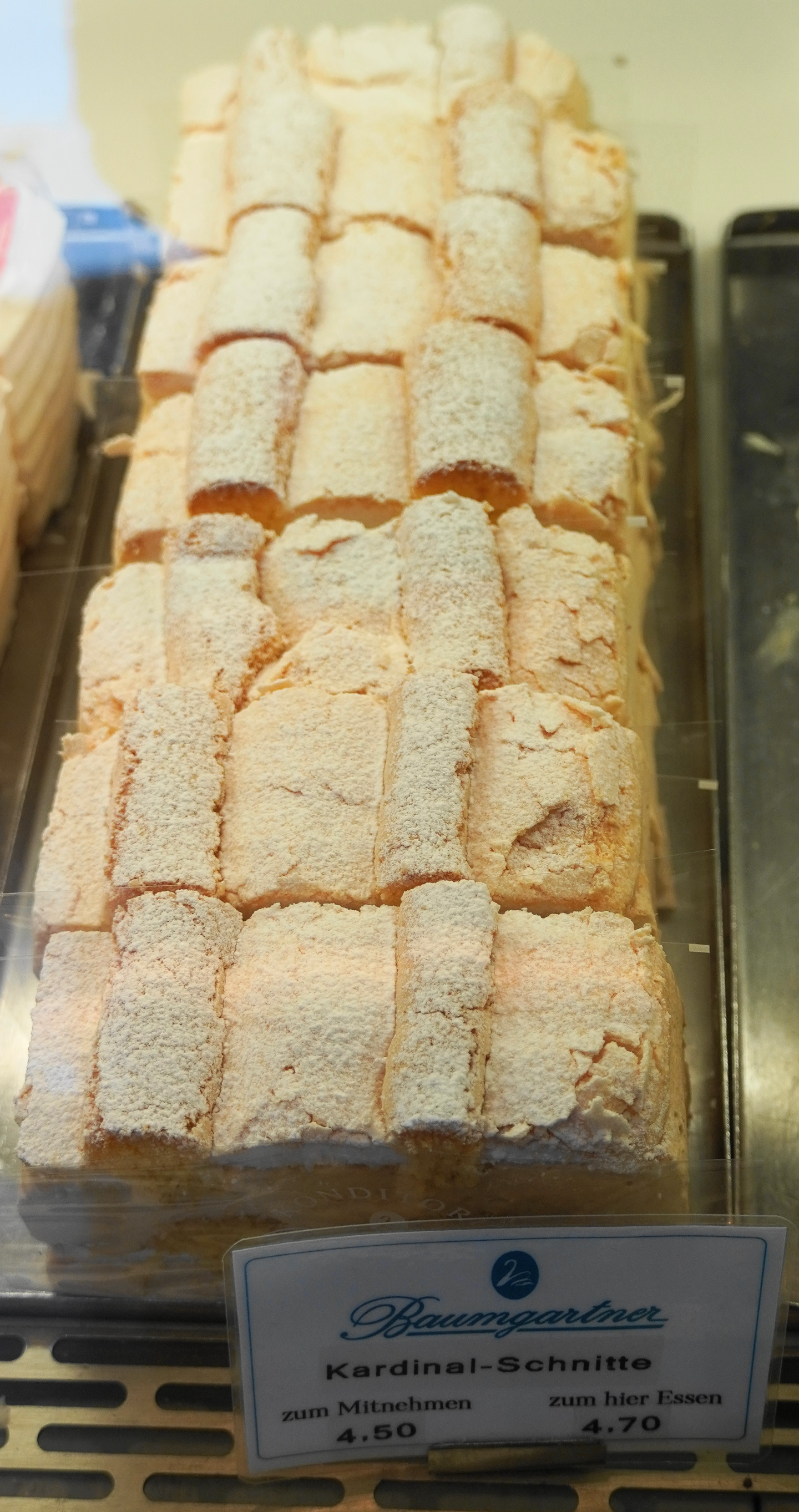
Commercially sold cardinal slice

Austrian cardinal slice, or simply cardinal slice (German: Kardinalschnitte) is a traditional Austrian cake. The white and gold colors of cardinal slice reference the colors of the Catholic Church, however, according to another source, the colors reference the Vatican. These colors appear because of its ingredients; genoise sponge mixture and soft meringue. Outer layers of the cake are a little bit crunchy, and the texture is airy and light.

Cardinal slice was created in 1933 by L. Heiner café pastry chain in honor of Theodor Innitzer.
