= Broyé poitevin =

French shortbread

Broyé Poitevin
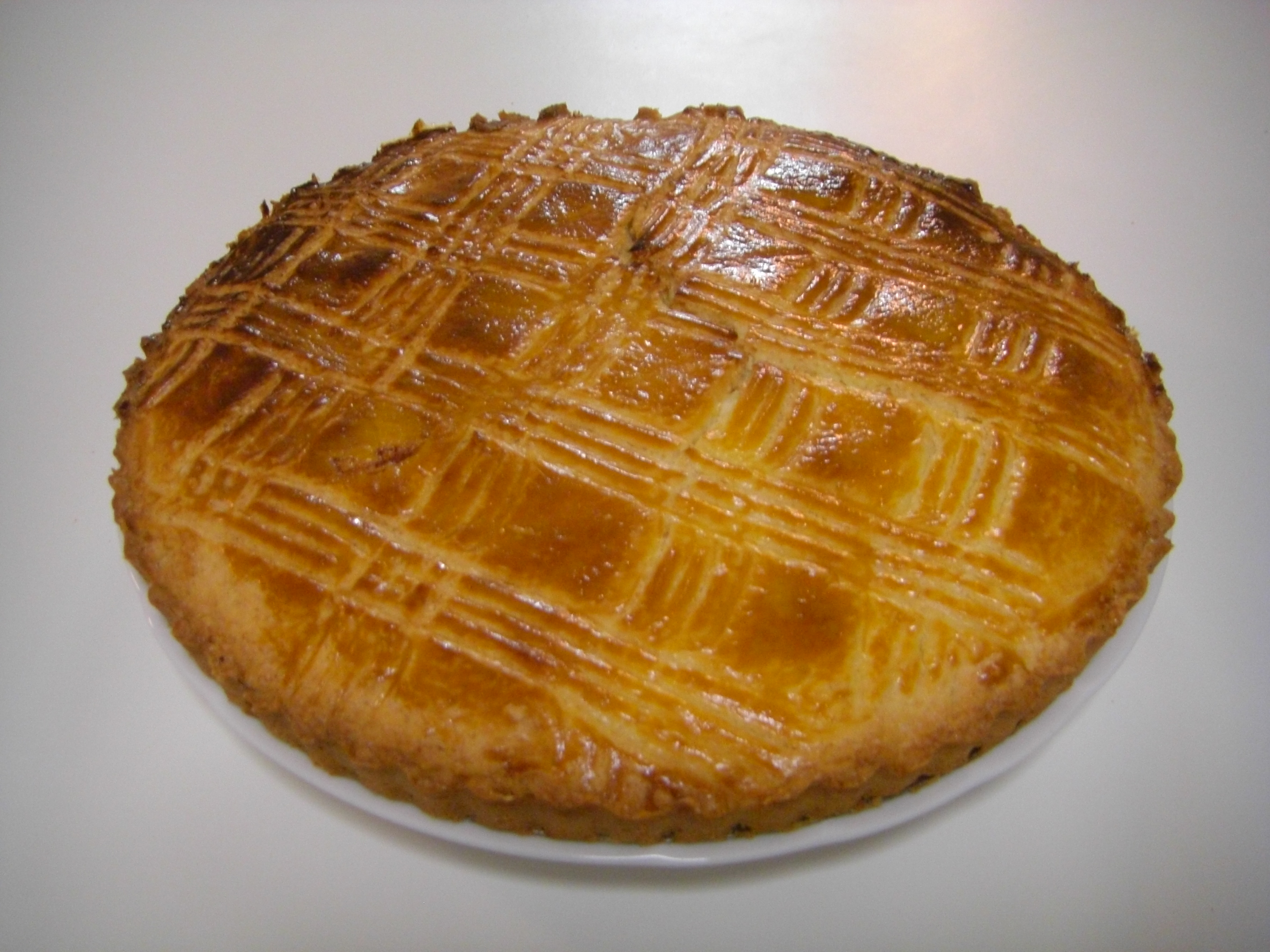
- Broyé du Poitou
- Alternative names: Broyé du Poitou
- Type: Biscuit
- Place of origin: France
- Region or state: Nouvelle-Aquitaine
- Main ingredients: sugar, flour, butter and eggs

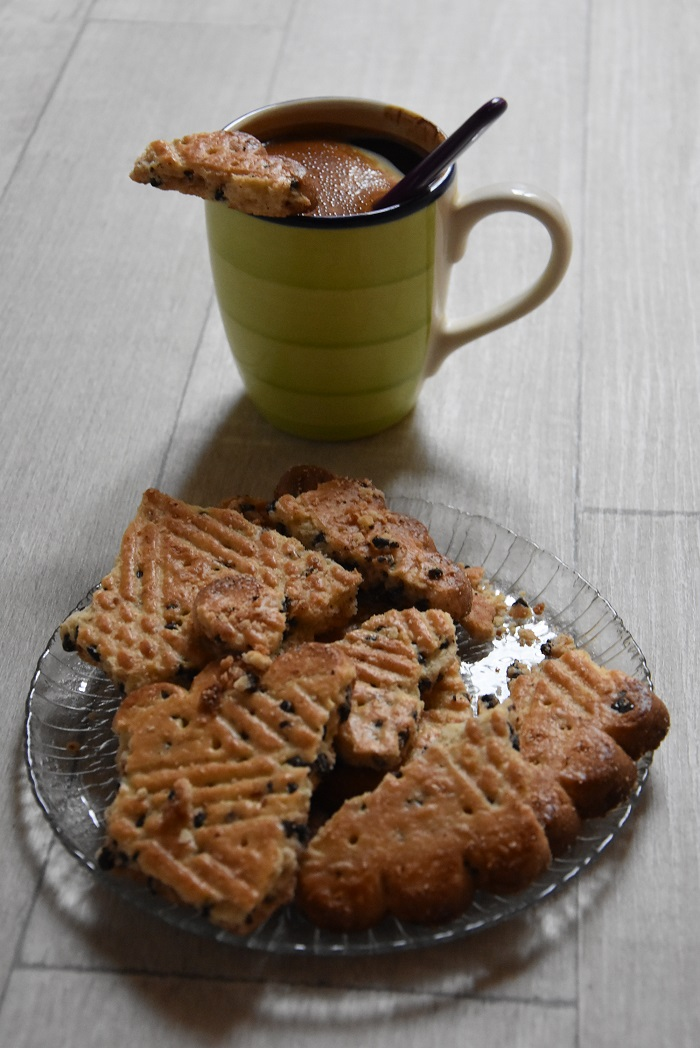
Just perfect with a cup of coffee !

The broyé poitevin or broyé du Poitou is a shortbread biscuit from the historic Poitou province of France and made with an unleavened dough of sugar, flour, butter and eggs.

It is available in large or small sizes (8–100 cm in diameter and about 2 cm thick).

== Confrérie de l'Ordre des Chevaliers de la Grand Goule ==
Founded in 2004 in Poitiers, the Confrérie de l'Ordre des Chevaliers de la Grand Goule promotes the broyé poitevin. Its objective is to protect and enhance the tradition of the broyé poitevin. The Confrérie organises the annual Rencontres Gourmandes du Poitou.

== See also ==
- Shortbread
