= Savarin mould =

Cake mould

The savarin mould is a large ring shaped mould, designed originally with an accompanying gâteau recipe in mind. It was created by the Julien brothers, Parisian pastry chefs who owned Julien Frères, a respected pastry shop in Paris in the mid 19th century. The name Savarin is given in honour of Jean Anthelme Brillat-Savarin, the famous French gourmet, who gave Auguste Julien the recipe for the rum syrup used in the original Savarin Gâteau. In modern times, however, the moulds are used for many preparations, sweet and savoury, including meat, seafood, and vegetable dishes, as well as cakes, breads, mousses and jellies.

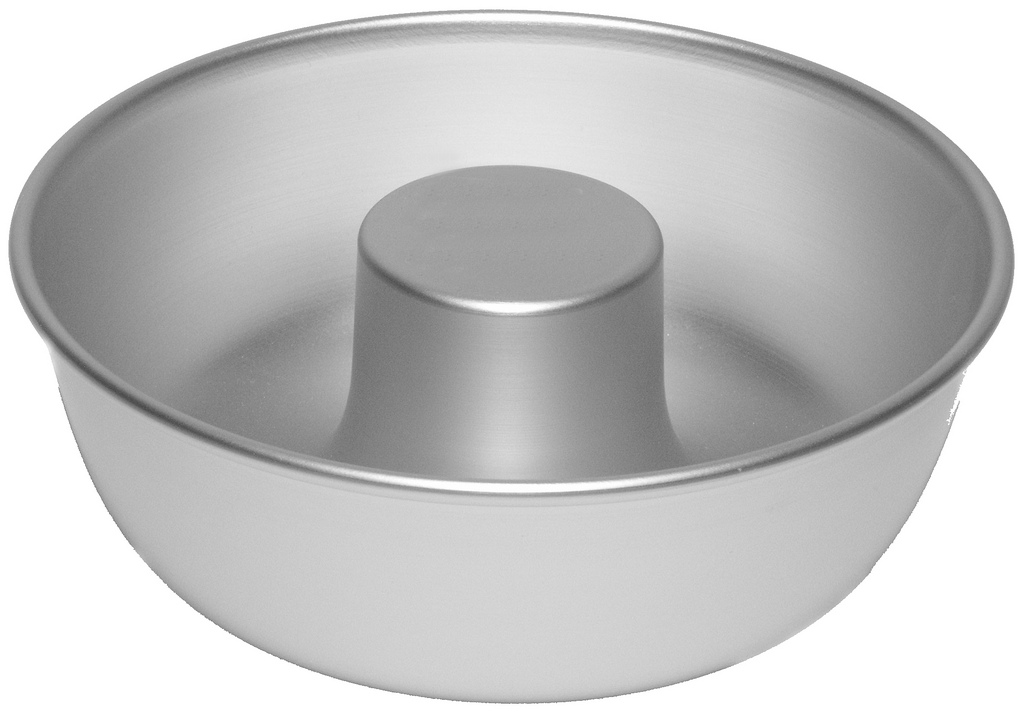
Savarin mould

Now often just referred to as a ring mould, the shape is essentially that of a ring shaped cylinder cut in half, as opposed to other ring shaped pans, bundt pans for instance, which are more straight sided and deeper.
