= Gâteau nantais =

French cake

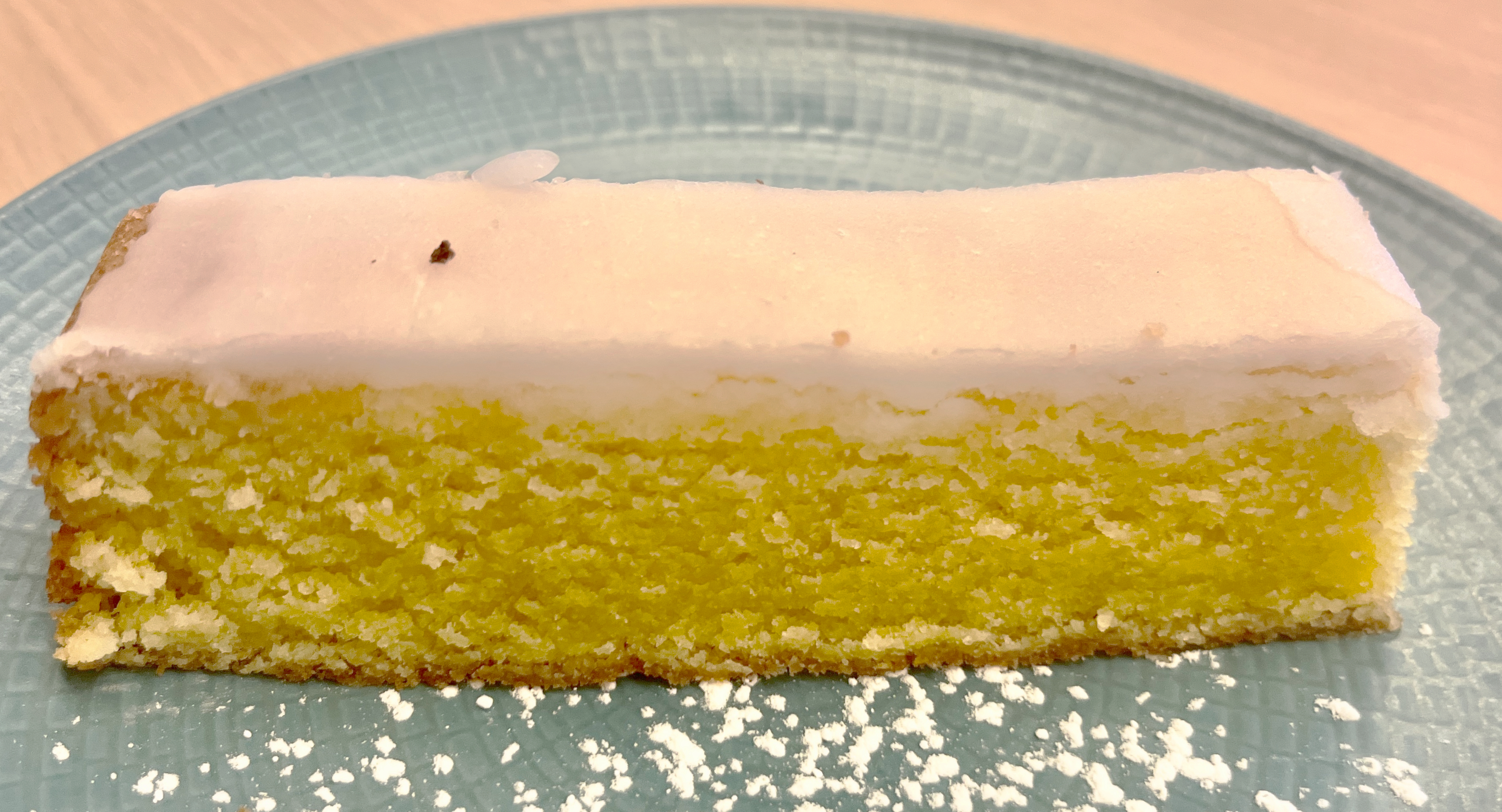
- A slice of Nantes cake
- Alternative names: gâteau du voyageur
- Type: Cake
- Place of origin: France
- Region or state: Nantes
- Serving temperature: cold
- Main ingredients: Flour, sugar, salted butter, eggs, almond meal, rum, icing sugar
- Variations: lemon juice, lemon zest, orange blossom water, vanilla extract, apricot gelée

Gâteau nantais is a cake originating in the city of Nantes in France. It is a soft, round quatre-quarts cake, made of flour, sugar, salted butter, eggs, and almond meal, then dampened with a punch of rum and lemon, sometimes with an apricot gelée centre. The round shaped cake top is topped with a white glaze thinned with rum, although lemon or orange blossom water can be substituted if the cake is to be served to children. It is recommended to make the cake a day before it is intended to be served. It keeps very well. An earlier version of the recipe, without eggs, reportedly kept for three to four weeks. In the modern recipe, the icing is white, whereas earlier versions were an amber colour.

A cookbook from the 1890s called for lemon peel to be grated into the cake's batter. The batter was firm enough to be stretched with a rolling pin and cut into rounds with a dough cutter. This version used a sprinkling of almond meal and sugar as a topping for the cake prior to cooking, and did not call for rum.

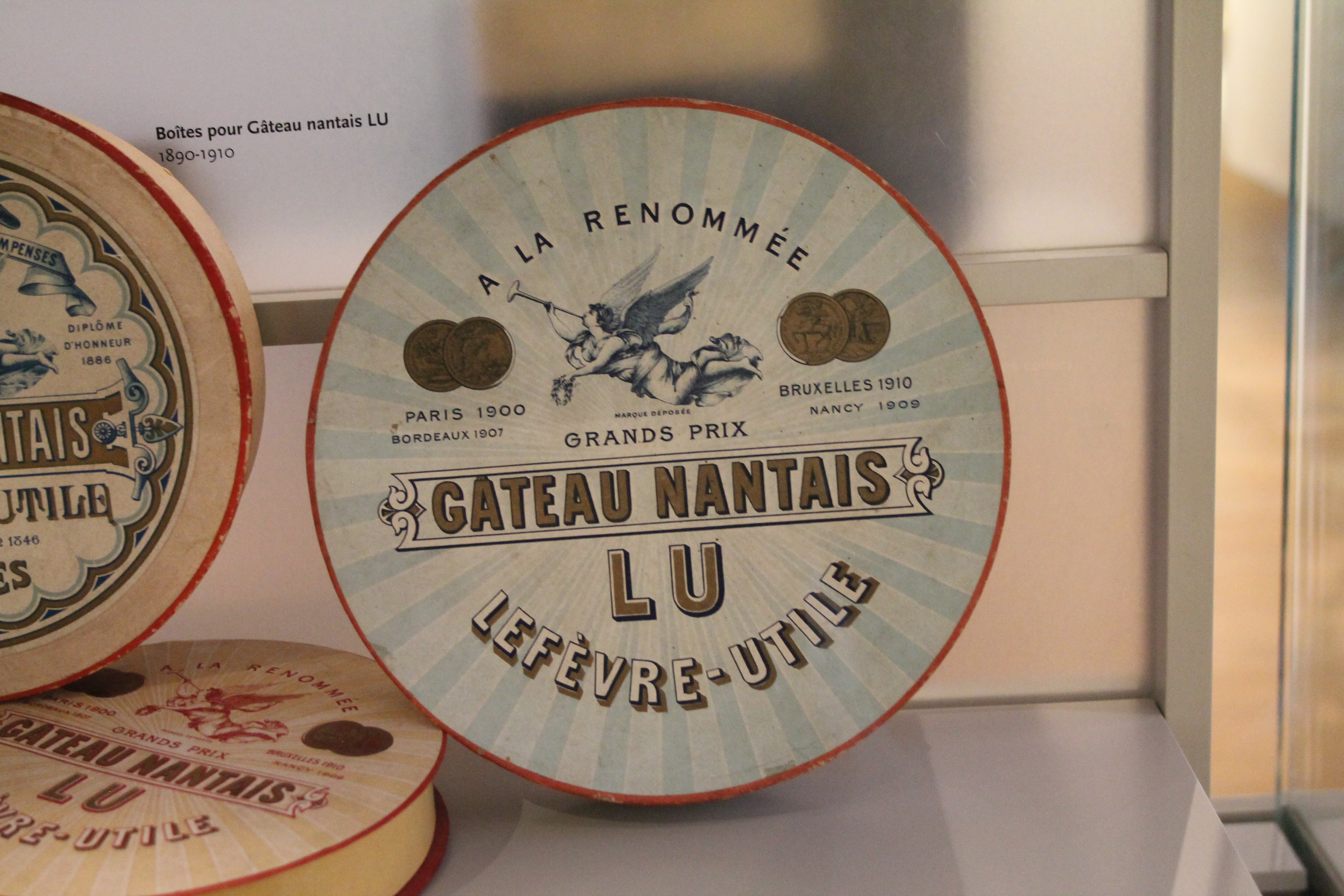
Box of gâteau nantais on display at the Nantes History Museum

In the 18th century, the port of Nantes was enriched by the triangular trade and saw many goods from the Caribbean colonies such as cane sugar, dark rum, and vanilla; ingredients that were later used in the composition of the Nantes cake. Because of this, it is sometimes called the "traveller's cake".

It is considered a regional speciality of Nantes. Columnist Paul Eudel says it was created in 1820 by a Roleau, master baker of Nantes. This "high-end" dessert was once served by housewives to their guests. It fell somewhat into oblivion until its revival by the biscuit factory LU, from 1910 to 1972. In the late 1990s, LU gave their recipe to Gilbert Debotté, who managed the Debotté patisserie.

Since it became popular again in the 20th century, pastry chefs and cooks in Nantes have served it in its most classic version, or have been inspired to create variants including additional ingredients.

== See also ==
- List of cakes
