= White cake =

Cake made without egg yolks

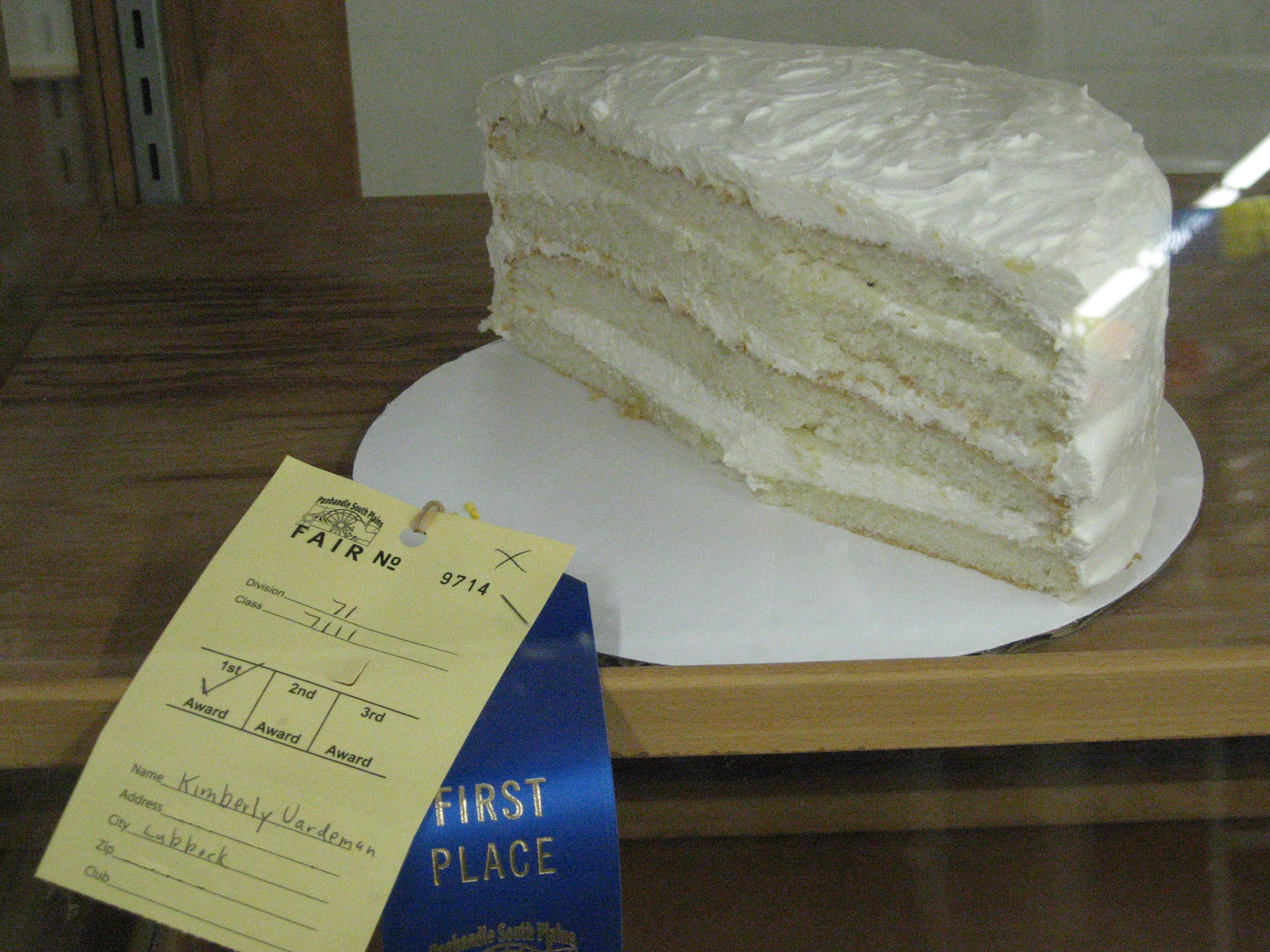
- White layer cake with white frosting
- Type: Cake
- Course: Dessert
- Main ingredients: White sugar, white flour, egg whites, baking powder or baking soda

White cake is a type of cake that is made without egg yolks. It was also once known as silver cake.

White cakes can be butter cakes or sponge cakes. They became widely available in the later part of the 19th century, and became associated with weddings and christenings.

== Ingredients and techniques ==
The key difference between a white cake and others is the absence of egg yolks or other ingredients that would change the color of the cake. (Egg yolks give yellow cake its color.) This decision affects the cake structurally. Because of the lack of egg yolks, the cake has less fat to impede its rise. White cakes tend also to be slightly less tender than cakes made with whole eggs.

White cake typically calls for cake flour rather than all-purpose flour to create a lighter batter with a finer crumb. White cakes are often vanilla-flavored. Sometimes artificial clear vanilla extract is used to preserve the white color.

White cake can be made by the creaming or reverse creaming mixing methods; the latter can be used to make tiered cakes with a tighter crumb that will stand up to stacking.

== Uses ==
White cake is a typical choice for tiered wedding cakes because of the appearance and texture of the cake. In general, white baked goods, which used white flour and white sugar, were a traditional symbol of wealth dating to the Victorian era when such ingredients were reliably available, though still expensive. The idea that white symbolizes purity at a white wedding was invented by the Victorians.

White cake is used as a component for desserts such as icebox cake, and some variations on charlotte russe and trifle. It is also used as the base for brightly colored cakes, such as a rainbow-colored cake, as the food coloring will produce clearer, brighter colors on white cake batter than if the cake has its own color.

Examples of white cake

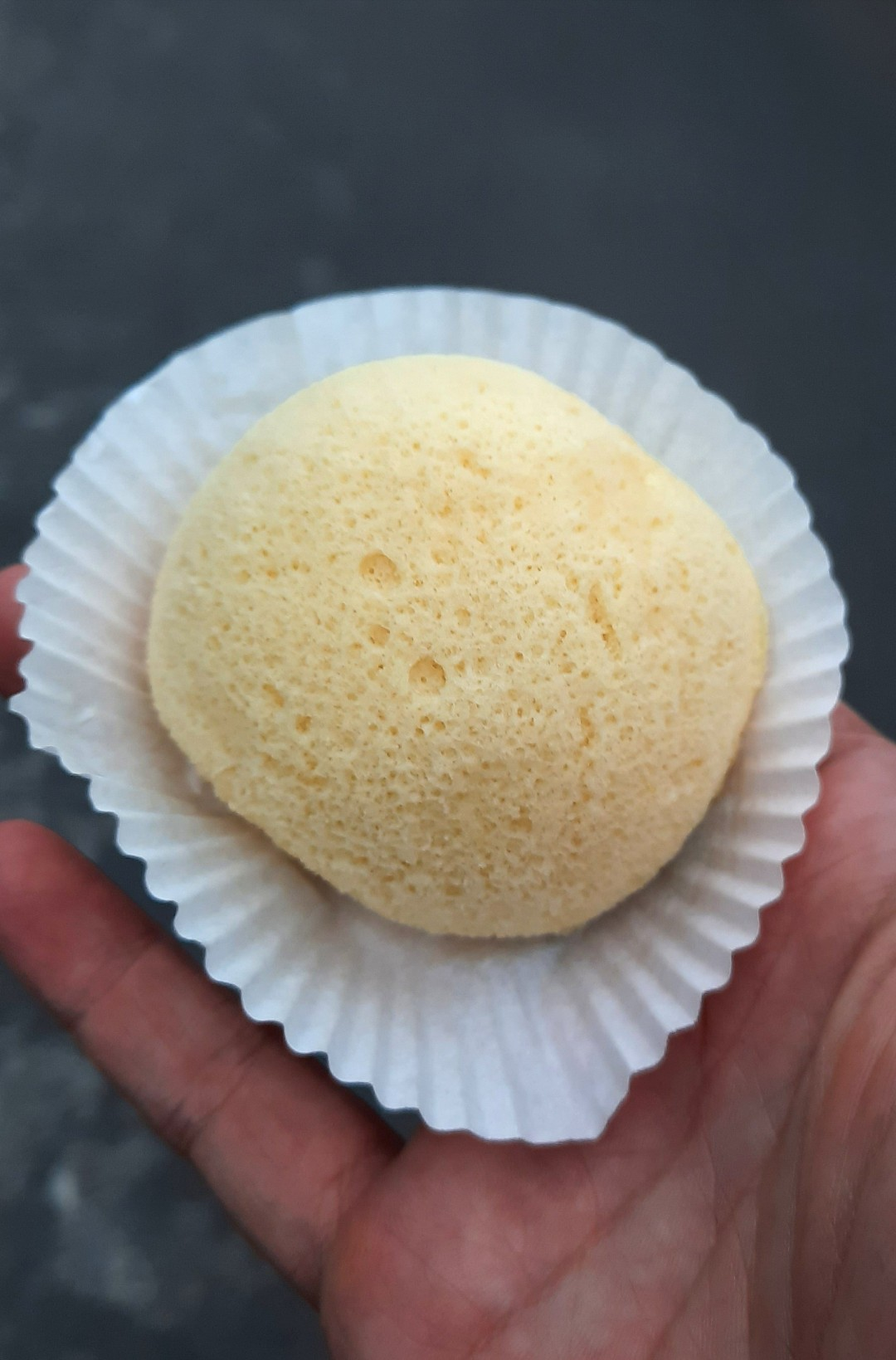
Plain Indonesian steamed white cake

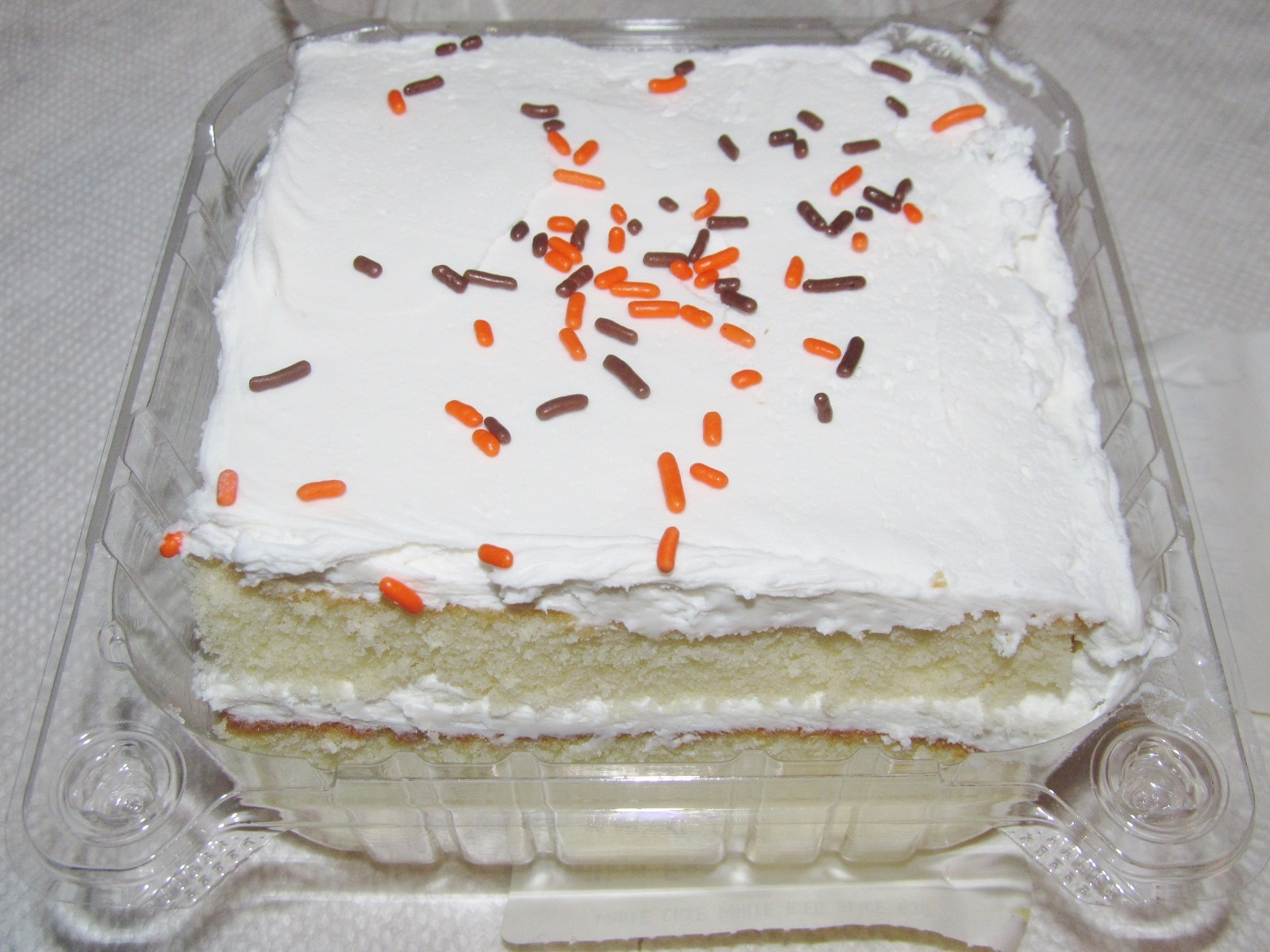
White layer cake with white frosting and colored sprinkles

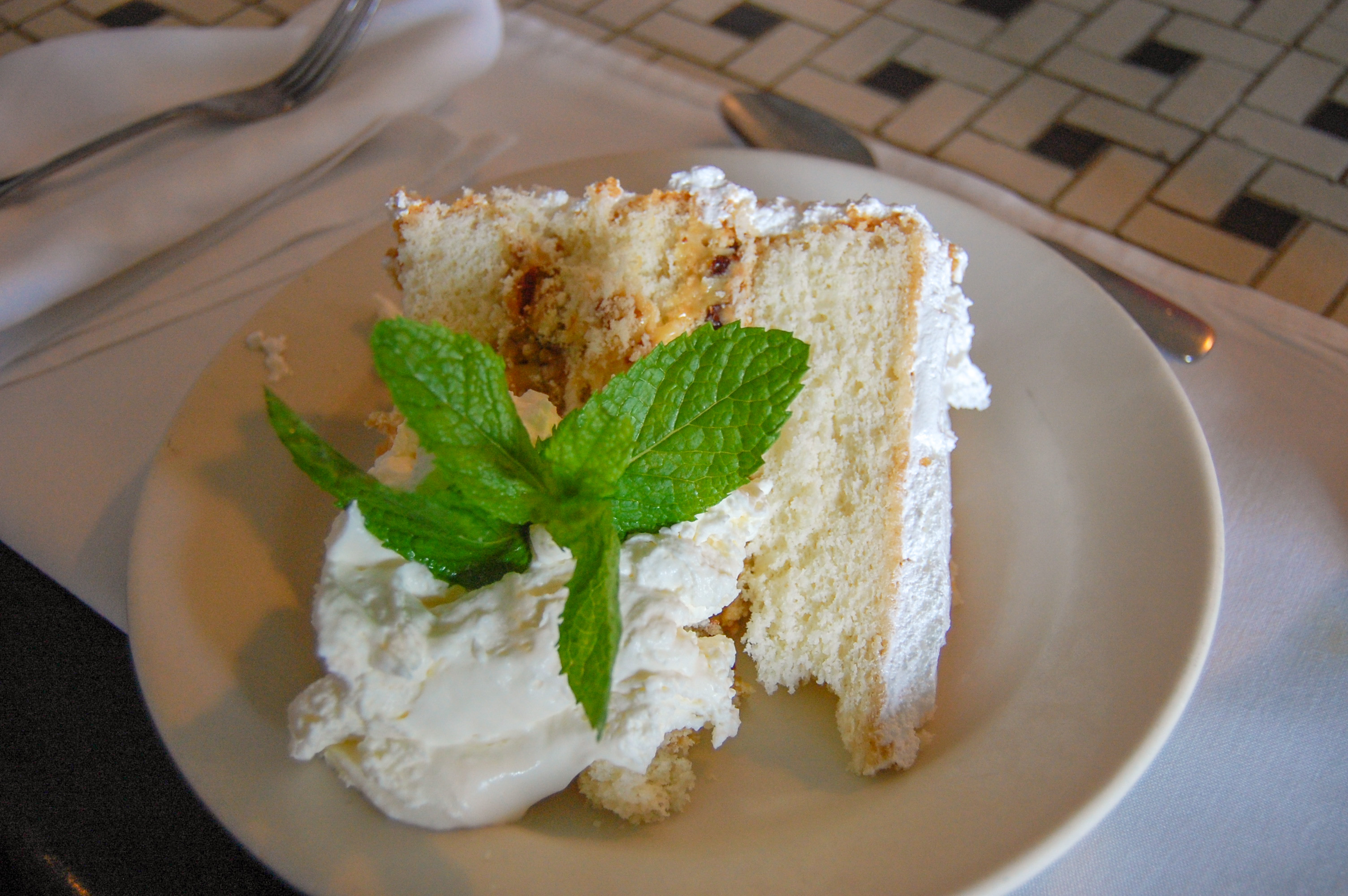
Lane cake, a white cake with raisin and nut filling

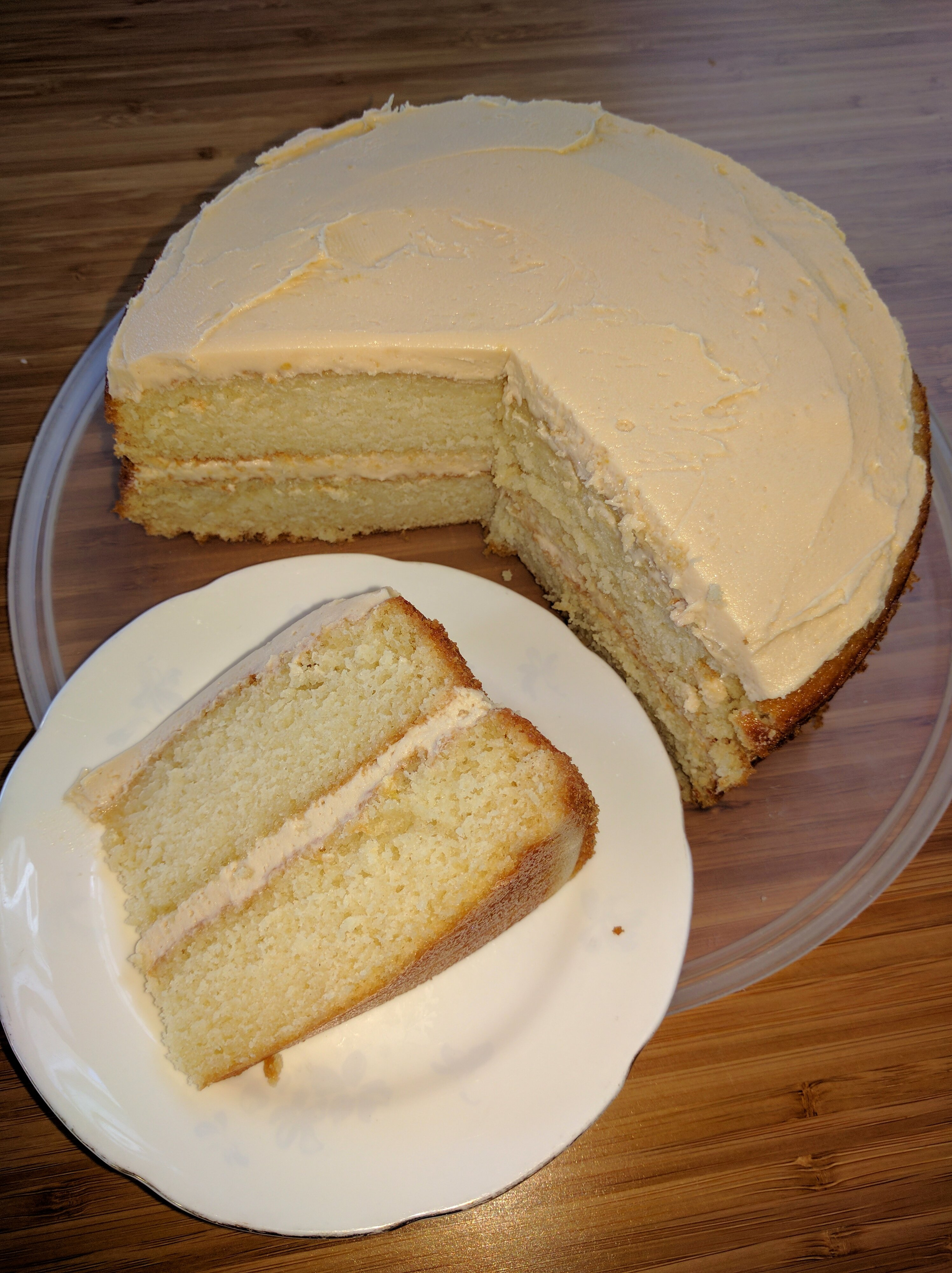
White layer cake with frosting

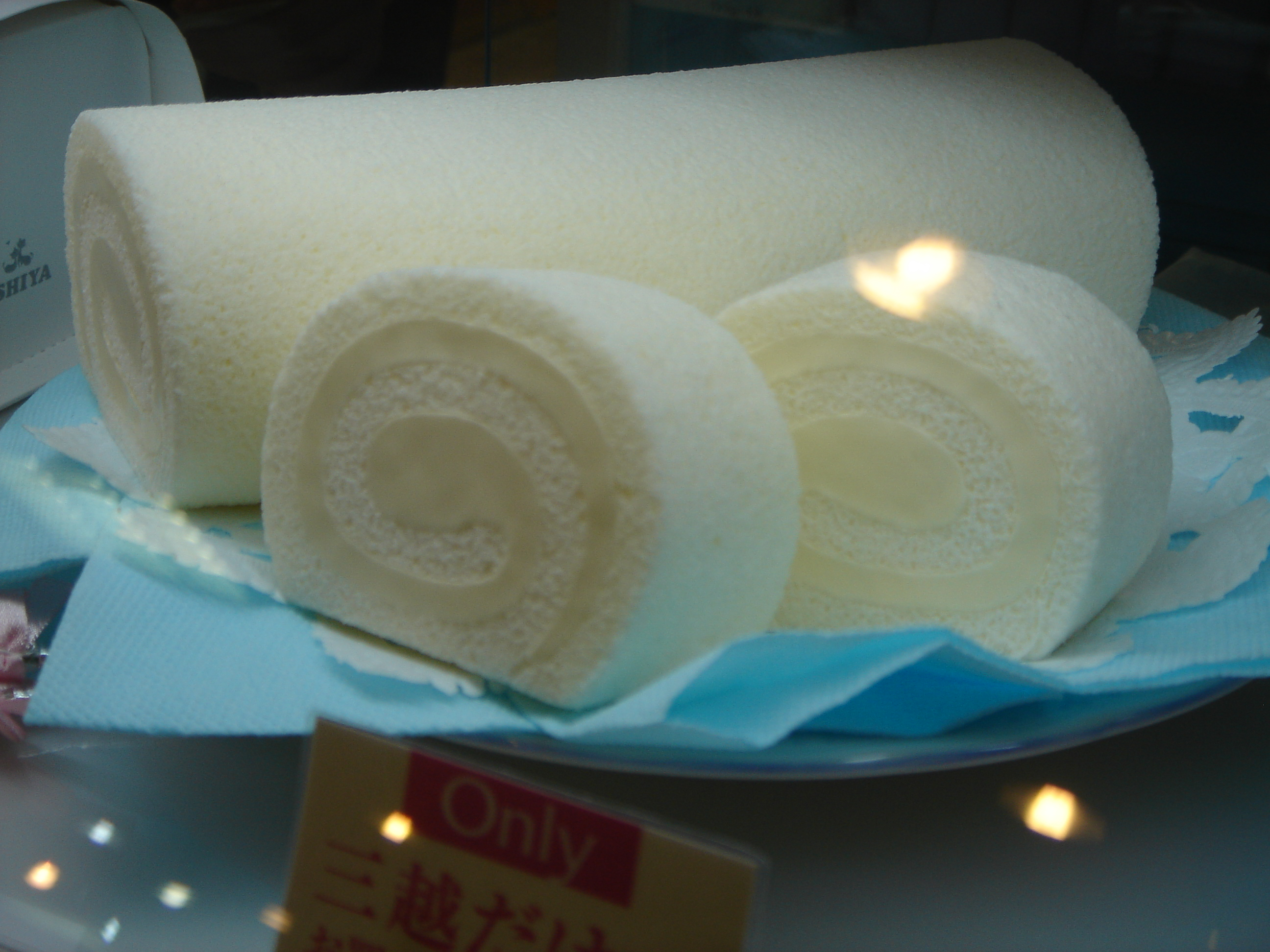
Swiss roll, made from white sponge cake

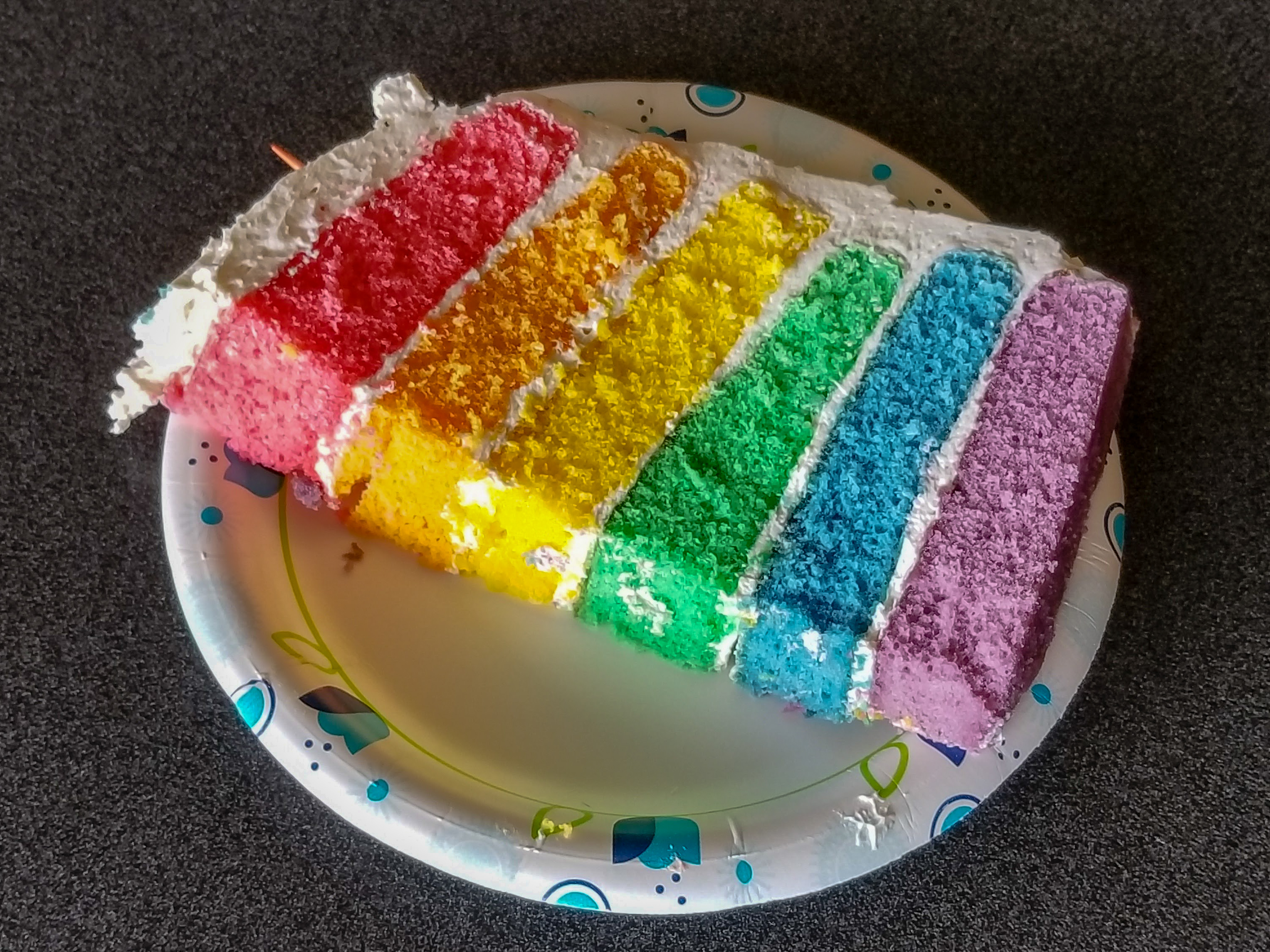
Rainbow-colored cakes are usually made from white cake with added food coloring.

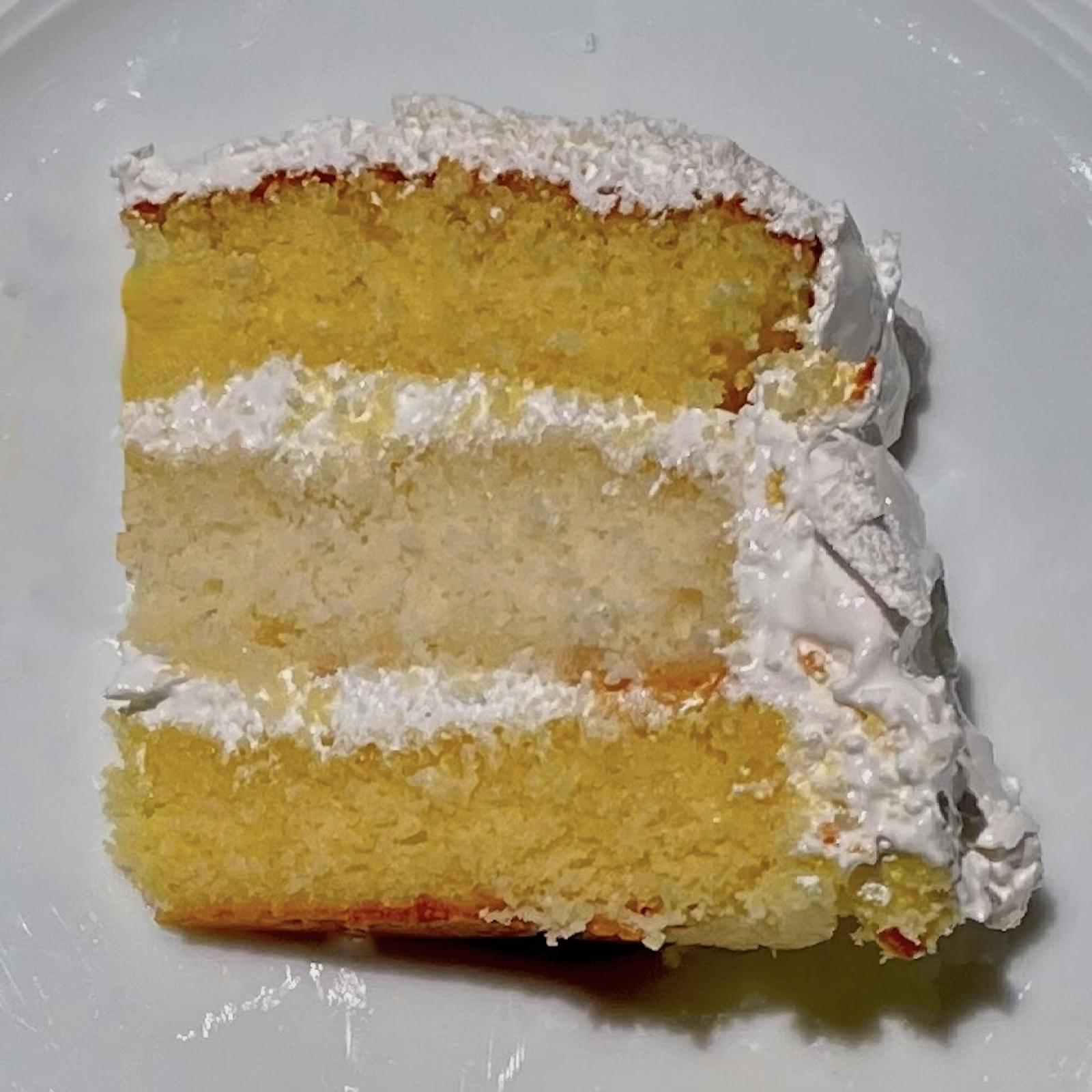
Silver and gold ribbon cake, with yellow and white cake layers

== History ==
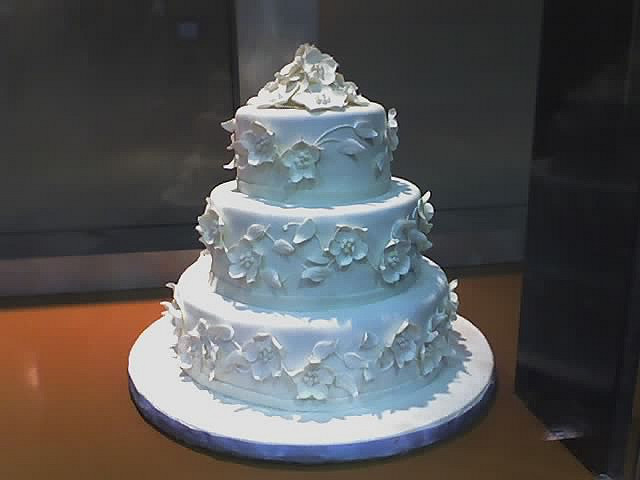
For several centuries, a "white cake" referred to any type of cake covered with white icing, such as this wedding cake decorated entirely in white. Underneath these white rolled fondant and gumpaste decorations lies a chocolate devil's food cake, which means it is not a white cake in the modern meaning of the term.

White cake is a relatively new invention, as it depends on having refined white sugar and white flour, in addition to omitting the egg yolks. From the 17th century, a "white cake" meant a fruitcake (or other non-white cake) coated with white icing, made from egg whites and expensive double-refined granulated white sugar, rather than a cake that was itself white. Any type of cake coated in white icing, such as the fruitcake served at the 1840 wedding of Queen Victoria and Prince Albert, was expensive and considered a status symbol.

In the early 19th century, a lady cake made of light-colored almond flour, and a tough white sponge cake that was a precursor to the modern and lighter angel food cake, were the only cakes that looked white when cut.

Modern white cakes appeared late in the 19th century, when white sugar, white flour, and reliable chemical leaveners such as baking powder became widely available. By the early 20th century, a tall, elaborately decorated white cake, called the bride cake, was established as the primary cake to celebrate weddings, with a dark-colored groom's cake disappearing or taking second place.

The first cake mix for white cake was introduced in the US around 1930.

By the end of the 20th century, chocolate cake had become more popular than any other cake flavor.

== Versions ==
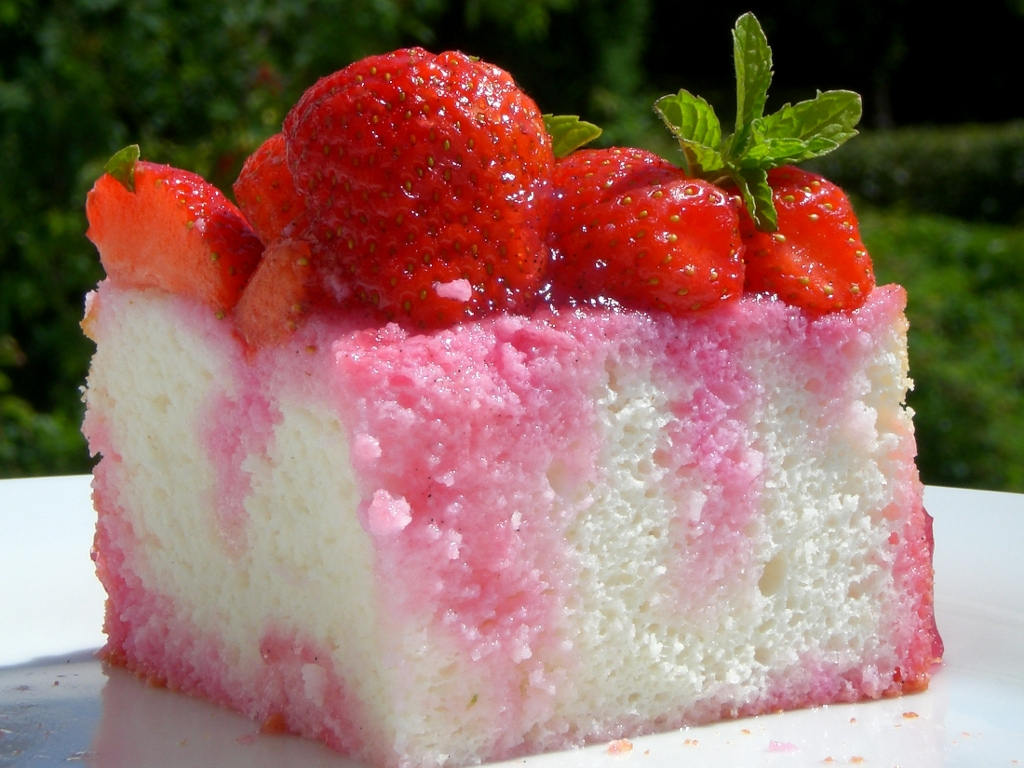
Angel food cake, a type of white sponge cake

- Angel food cake, a sponge cake made using only egg whites
- Lady Baltimore cake, a cake originating in the Southern United States
- Mary Todd Lincoln's white almond cake was a celebrated cake during the period surrounding Abraham Lincoln's presidency
- White velvet cake, a yolkless cake from the 1860s that is a version of red velvet cake

== See also ==
- List of cakes
- Foam cake, a style of cake that includes some white cakes
