= Sponge cake =

Type of cake

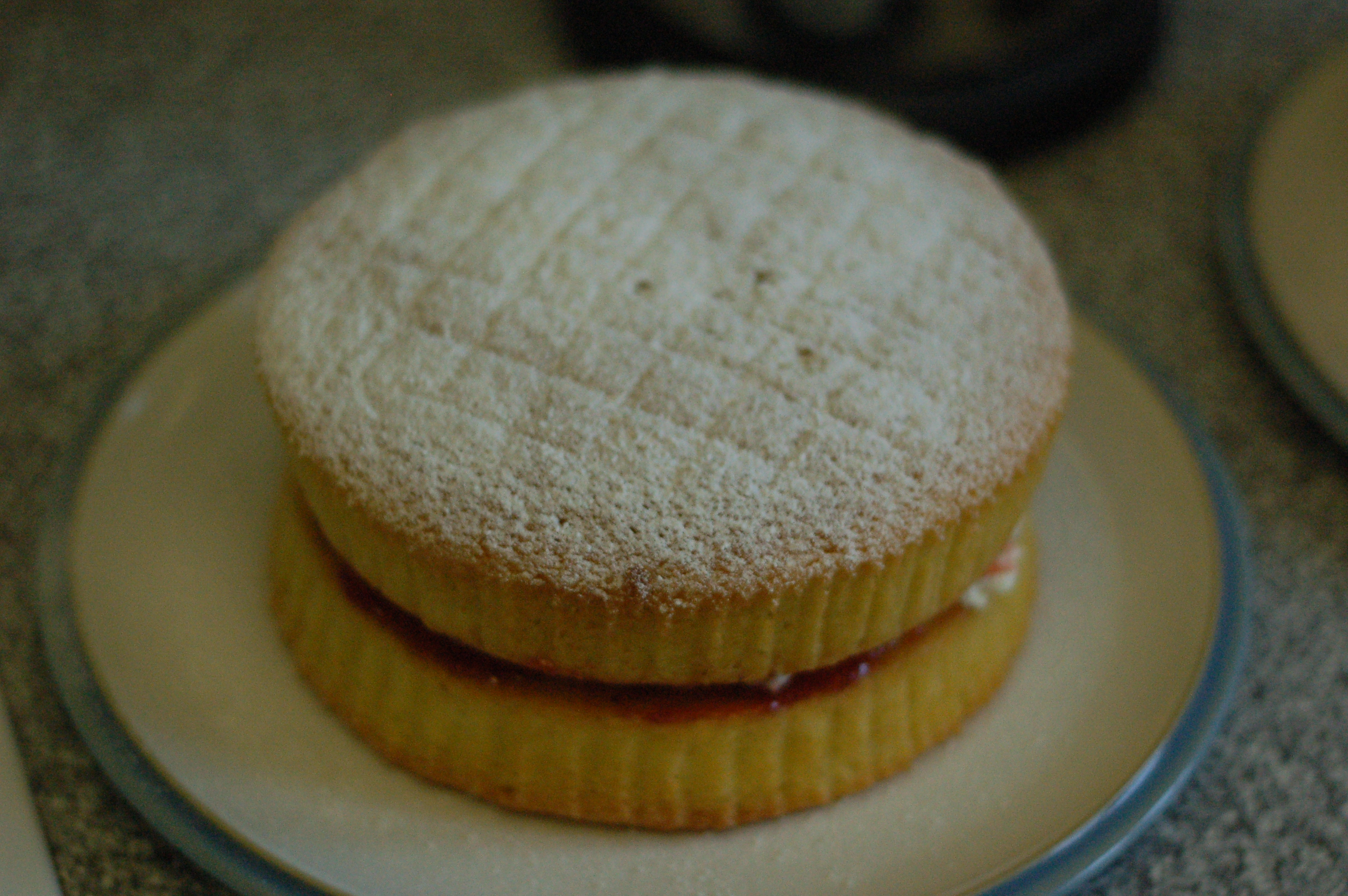
- A Victoria sponge
- Type: Cake
- Course: Dessert, tea
- Place of origin: United Kingdom
- Main ingredients: Wheat flour, sugar, egg whites, baking powder
- Variations: Rice flour

Sponge cake is a light cake made with egg whites, flour and sugar, sometimes leavened with baking powder. Most sponge cakes contain egg yolks, but some do not, such as angel food cake.

The sponge cake is thought to be one of the first non-yeasted cakes, and the earliest attested sponge cake recipe in English is found in a book by the poet Gervase Markham, The English Huswife (1615). The cake was more like a cracker: thin and crisp.

The modern sponge cakes arose when bakers started using beaten eggs as a leavening agent in the mid-19th century. The creation of baking powder by a British food manufacturer in 1843 allowed the addition of butter, permitting the creation of the Victoria sponge. In American baking terms, a sponge cake is different from a butter cake.

== History ==
According to food historian Gil Marks, the use of an egg and sugar mixture as a leavening agent in batters was discovered in Moorish Spain around the 11th century. The earliest known recipe for sponge cake (or biscuit bread) appears in Gervase Markham's The English Huswife (1615), is prepared by mixing flour and sugar into eggs, then seasoning with anise and coriander seeds. 19th-century descriptions of "avral bread" (funeral biscuits) vary from place to place but were sometimes described as "sponge biscuits" or a "crisp sponge" with a light dusting of sugar". Traditional American sponge recipes diverged from earlier methods of preparation by adding ingredients such as vinegar, baking powder, hot water and milk. The basic recipe is also used for madeleines, ladyfingers, and trifles, as well as some versions of strawberry shortcakes.

Although sponge cake is usually made without butter, buttercream, pastry cream or other types of fillings and frostings are often added for flavour. The sponge soaks up flavours from fresh fruits, fillings and custard sauces. Sponge cake covered in boiled icing was very popular in American cuisine during the 1920s and 1930s. The delicate texture of sponge and angel food cakes, and the difficulty of their preparation, made them more expensive than daily staple pies. The historic Frances Virginia Tea Room in Atlanta served sponge cake with lemon filling and boiled icing. New York City's Crumperie served not only crumpets but toasted sponge cake as well.

== Methods of preparation ==
The basic whisked sponge cake contains no fat. It is made by whisking egg whites and caster sugar and gently folding in flour. The process of whisking egg whites incorporates air bubbles to create a foam by agitating the protein albumen to create a partially coagulated membrane, making the egg whites stiffer and increasing their volume. This type of cake, also called foam cake, depends on aeration of eggs and heat to rise. Some types of sponges are baked in ungreased pans to improve the cake's rise by allowing the batter to adhere and climb the sides of the pan. To maintain the moisture of the cake it is sometimes made with potato flour.

Variations on the basic sponge sometimes add butter or egg yolks to moisten the cake. For Genoise cake, flour and melted butter are added to the egg mixture for a moister cake. The "biscuit" sponge from early American cuisine is made by beating egg yolks with sugar, then alternately folding in whisked egg whites and flour. Anne Willan says both types of sponge cake are represented in French cuisine. According to Willan "sponge may have some butter added, but not much or it will not rise". Cream of tartar or baking soda is recommended by some turn-of-the-20th-century cookbooks to make Swiss rolls more pliable and easier to roll.

For some cakes, such as the Victoria sponge, fat and sugar are creamed before eggs and flour are incorporated into the batter, similar to pound cake. In British English, layer cakes such as the Victoria sponge are called "sandwich sponge". This type of buttery cake was not possible without baking powder, which was discovered by English food manufacturer Alfred Bird in 1843, allowing the sponge to rise higher.

== Types ==
=== Asian ===
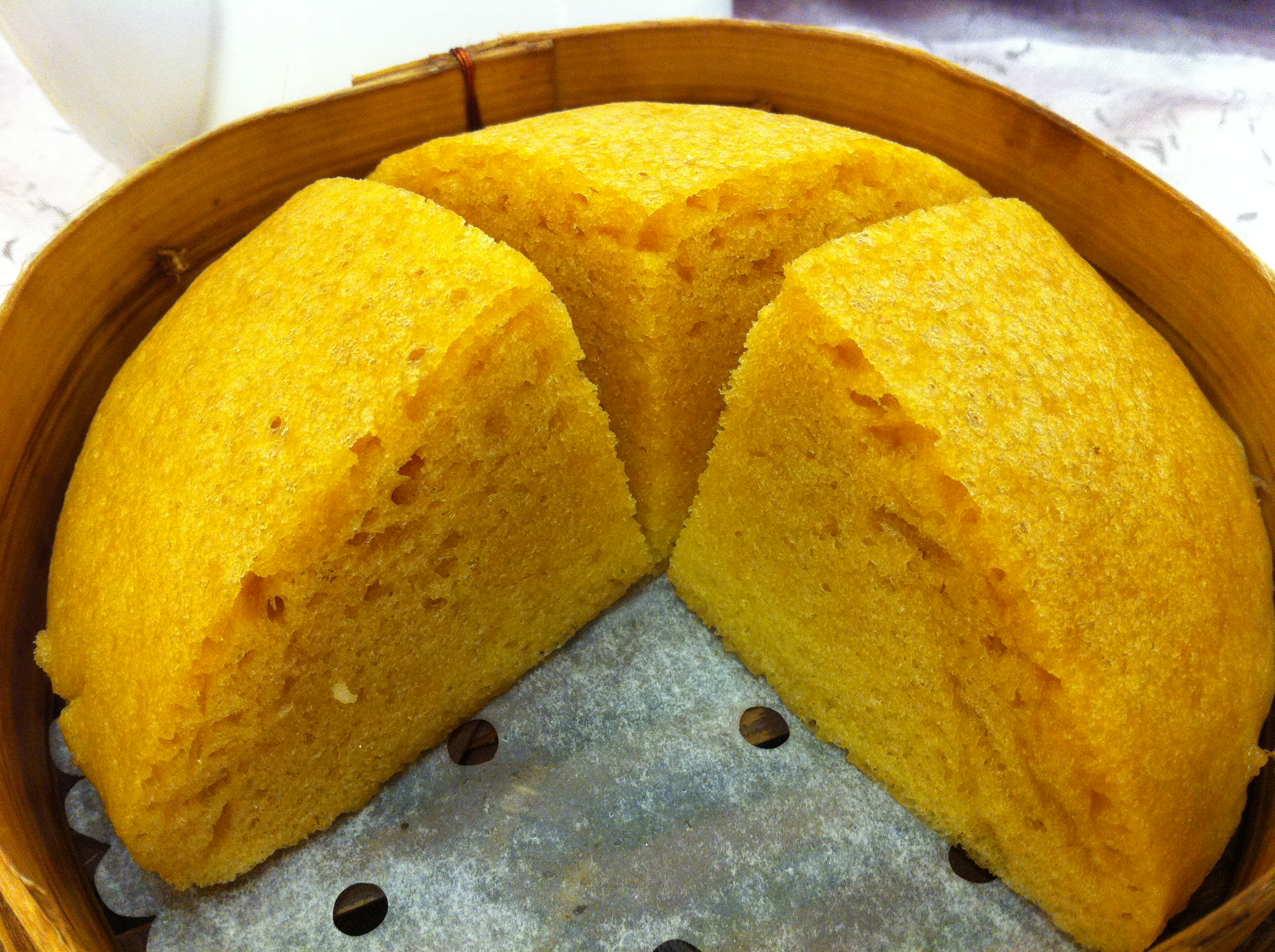
Steamed sponge cake known as ma lai gao (Malay sponge cake)

In the Philippines, sponge cakes and chiffon cakes were introduced during the Spanish period. They are known collectively as mamón. They are typically baked as cupcakes (torta), as loaves (taisan), or as cake rolls (pianono). Traditionally they are simply served with butter (or margarine) and white sugar. Variants of mamón also use unique ingredients, the most common being purple yam and pandan leaves which result in the ube cake and the buko pandan cake. Crispy cookie-like versions are known as mamón tostado and broas.

Steamed sponge cakes such as the ma lai gao are commonly found in Malaysia. Chinese almond sponge is steamed and topped with boiled icing, chocolate, vegetables or fresh fruit. Korean sponge called saeng is usually made with rice flour and topped with whipped topping and fruit. Some Vietnamese varieties may have fresh herbs such as mint, lemongrass or basil added to the batter, and be topped with caramelized tropical fruit. Milk and jaggery are added to sponge cake in India which is served with the creamy Sri Lankan speciality "avocado crazy". Western-style sponge cakes topped with whipped cream and strawberries are popular in Japan where sponge is also used as a base for cheesecakes.

=== Angel food cake ===
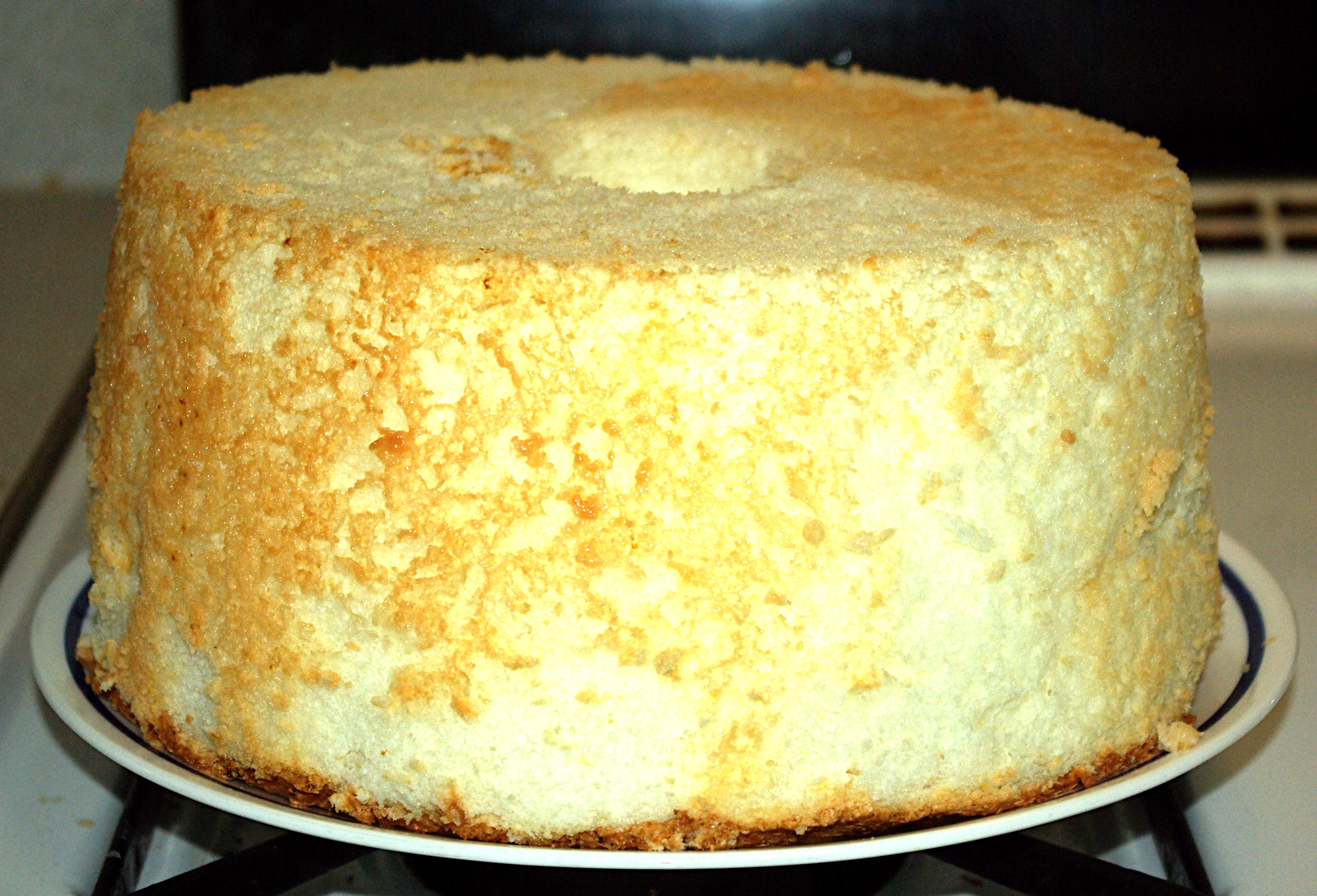
Angel food cake

Angel food cake was invented in 19th-century America. It does not contain egg yolks or butter and is leavened using only egg whites and baking powder. The delicate cake is baked in an ungreased pan and cooled upside down.

=== Boston cream pie ===
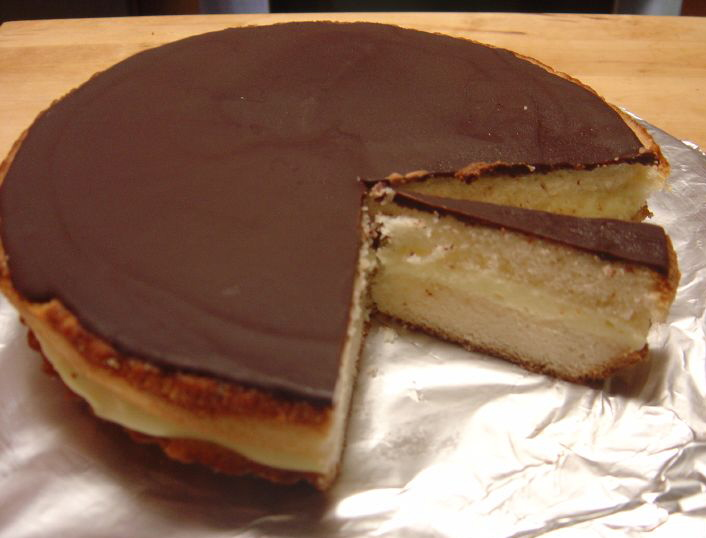
Boston cream pie

Boston cream pie, the official state dessert of Massachusetts, is a chocolate-glazed, layered yellow sponge cake filled with pastry cream. It may be based on the Washington pie, originally two layers of yellow sponge cake with jam filling and a dusting of icing sugar. The first known written recipe from the 1878 Granite Iron Ware Cook Book uses baking powder for the sponge. Maria Parloa published several recipes for a cream pie, including one for a chocolate cream pie. Parloa's recipe is the closest to the modern Boston cream pie.

=== Génoise ===
French pastry chefs created a cake texture that resembled pound cake more than the traditional sponge cake. Techniques were developed to make the cake lighter, including beating the eggs over heat or beating the egg yolks and whites separately.

=== Joconde sponge cake ===
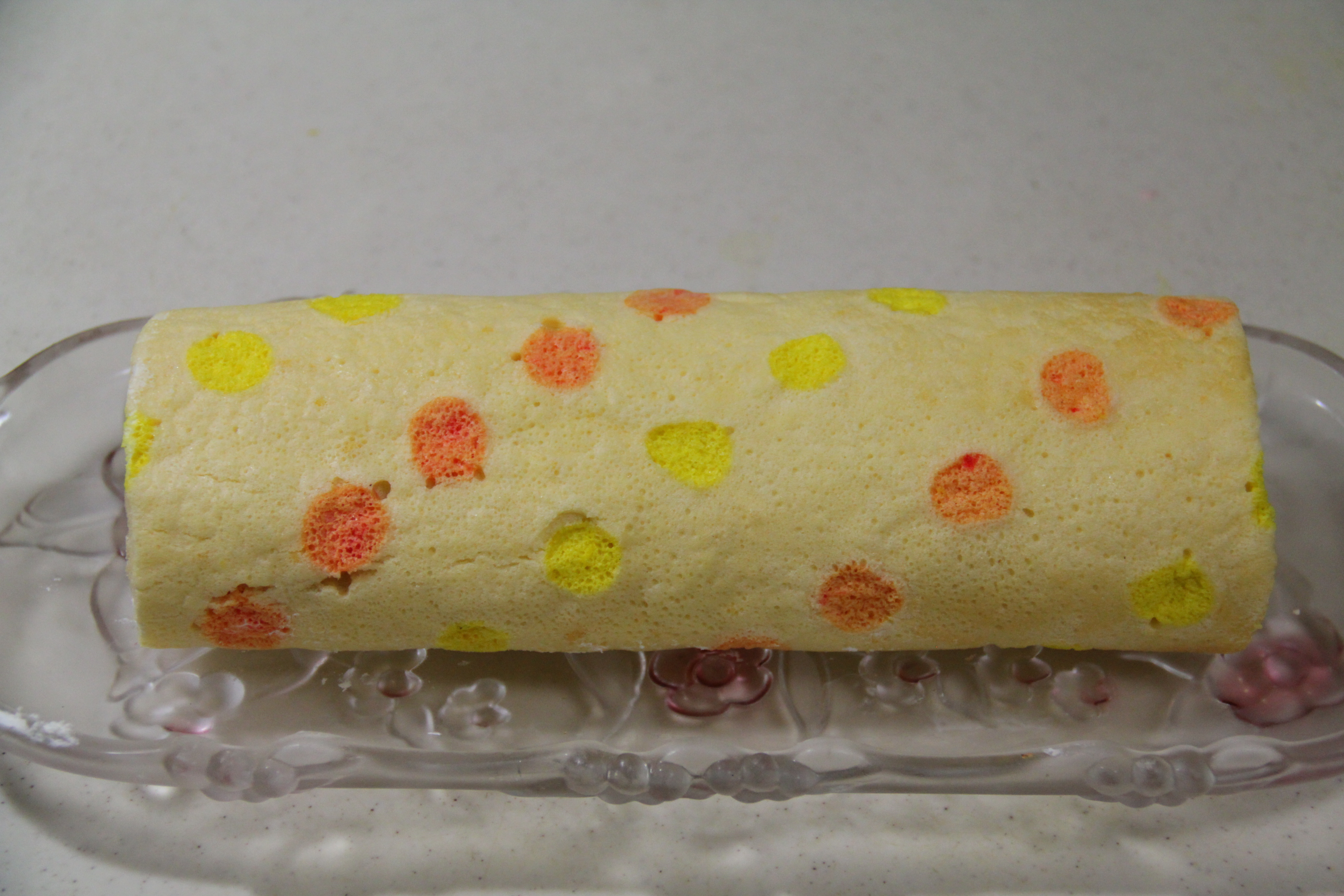
Joconde sponge cake

A relative of the Génoise, the Joconde sponge cake (or Biscuit Joconde) is a thin sponge cake made with ground almonds. It can be used as a layer in a layer cake (for example an opera cake), or for decorative purposes as Joconde imprime.

=== Pão de Ló ===
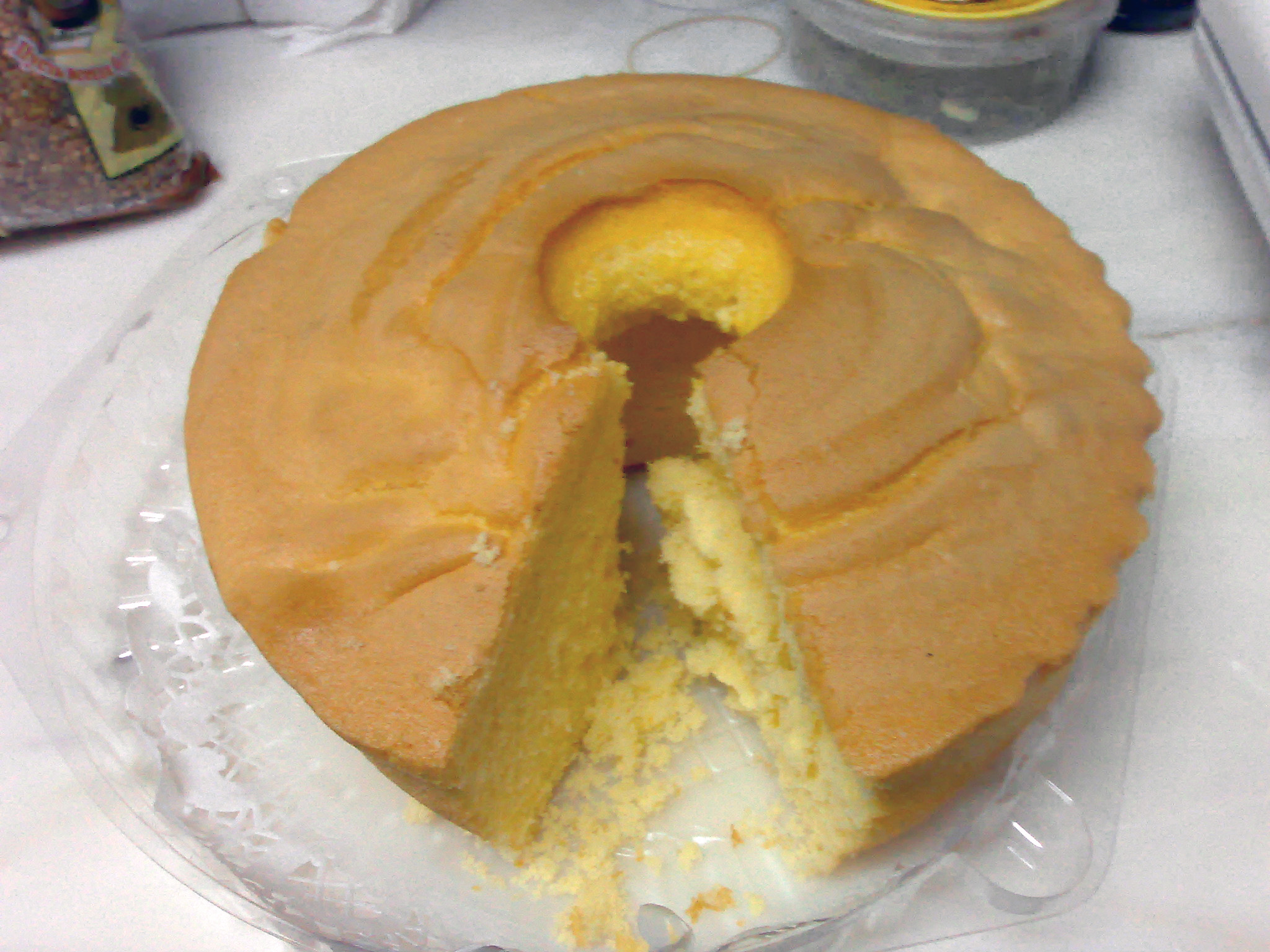
Pão de ló

This sponge variation from Portuguese cuisine is flavoured with lemon or orange peel. It is served plain, and day-old cake may be incorporated into other desserts such as puddings. The pão de Ló de Alfeizerão is lightly baked to a pudding-like consistency, much like the pão de Ló de Ovar, and flavoured with brandy. Anecdotal legends about the cake's origin associate it with a secret recipe passed down by nuns to the village of Alfeizerão. The manufacture of commercial markets began during the Portuguese Revolution of 1910.

The Pão-de-Ló evolved from the old French pain de lof, which in turn was a Dutch borrowing from loef. All variants loef, lof and ló are related to the English word luff, and refer to the windward (aka luffward/loofward) side of a nautical sail. The French make a very similar cake called Gâteau de Savoie. In Italy, the cake was known as pan di spagna. Also in Portugal, the term pão de Hespanha/pão de Castella was used around the 16th century. Introduced to Japan by Portuguese traders in the 16th century, the Japanese variations on the cake are known as castella, kasutera or simply pan.

=== Plava ===
Plava is found in Jewish cuisine and is usually eaten during Pesach. The batter is leavened with egg whites and frequently includes flavourings such as lemon zest or almond essence.

=== Swiss roll ===
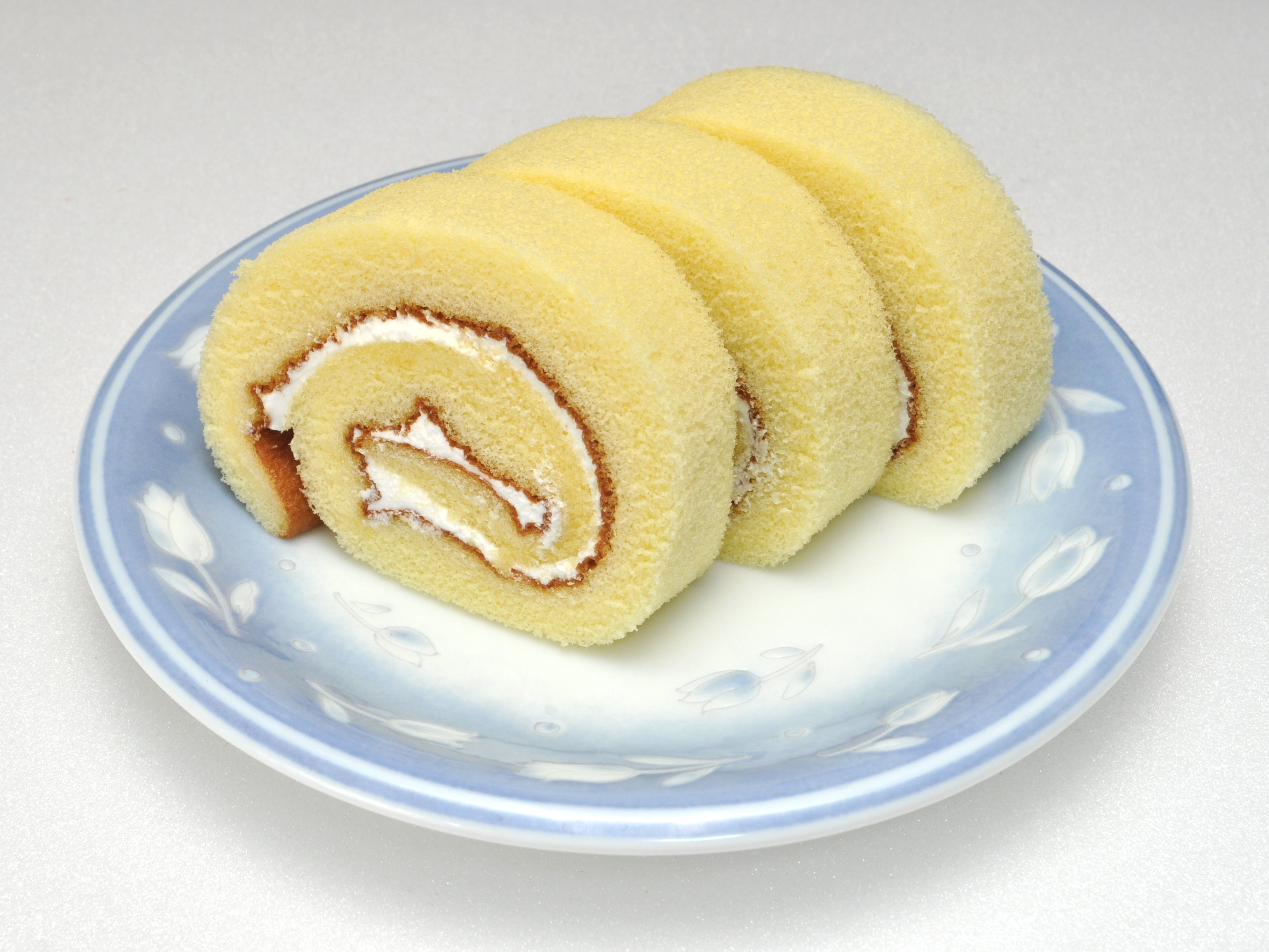
Three slices of Swiss roll cake

A Swiss roll is a thin cake that is spread with a layer of filling and rolled as a roulade (into a log shape).

There are many variations. A Christmas-themed chocolate variation is called Yule log. In the US and some other countries, it may be filled with jam and called a jelly roll. In Spanish-speaking countries, it is often called brazo de reina (queen's arm) or arrollado and filled with dulce de leche, and a strawberry-filled version may be called rollo de fresa (strawberry roll).

=== Tipsy cake ===
Isabella Beeton included a recipe for her version of Tipsy cake in Mrs. Beeton's Book of Household Management where the cake was baked in a decorative mould before it was soaked in sherry and brandy with custard poured over, or broken into smaller pieces and topped with whipped cream like a trifle.

=== Fanta cake ===
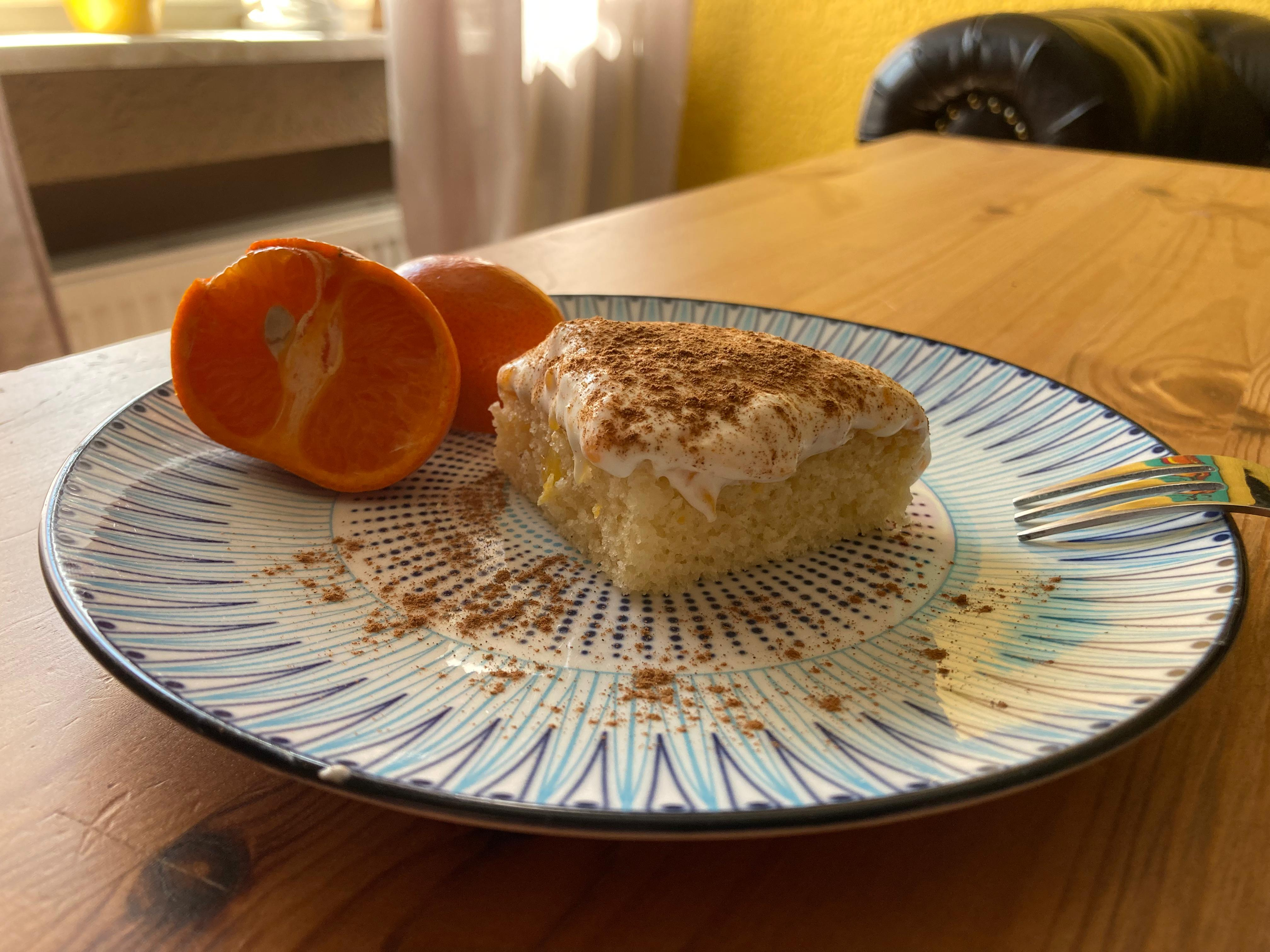
A Fanta cake

Fanta cake originated in Germany, made with a sponge base. The key ingredient of the sponge base is Fanta or sparkling mineral water; making the cake base fluffier than usual sponge-based cakes. It is very popular in Germany, the Southern US and West Africa.

=== Trifle ===
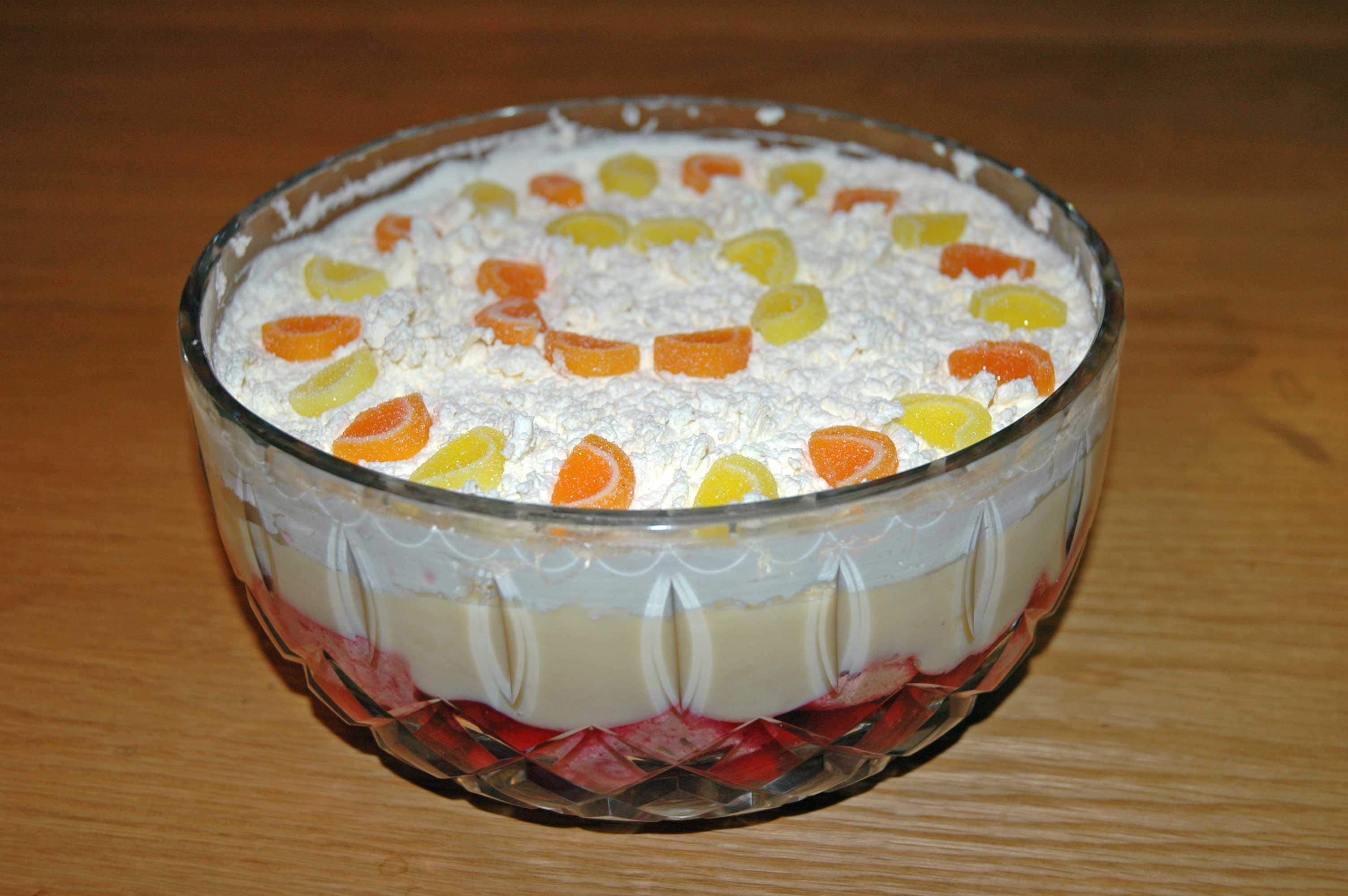
Trifle

The earliest known form of trifle was a simple thickened cream flavored with sugar, rose water and ginger but recipes for egg-thickened custard poured over sponge fingers, almond macaroons and sack-soaked ratafia biscuits are known from the mid-18th century. In 1747 Hannah Glasse added syllabub and currant jelly over the custard. Similar recipes are known for the same time with the sponge soaked in sherry, wine or fruit juice. Eliza Acton's recipe for "Duke's Custard" was made from custard poured over brandied cherries rolled in sugar with sponge fingers (or macaroons) and pink whipped cream. Wyvern complained that trifle "should be made to time-honoured standards, and not debased into a horror of stale cake, mean jam, canned fruits, packet jelly and packet custard".

=== Victoria sponge ===
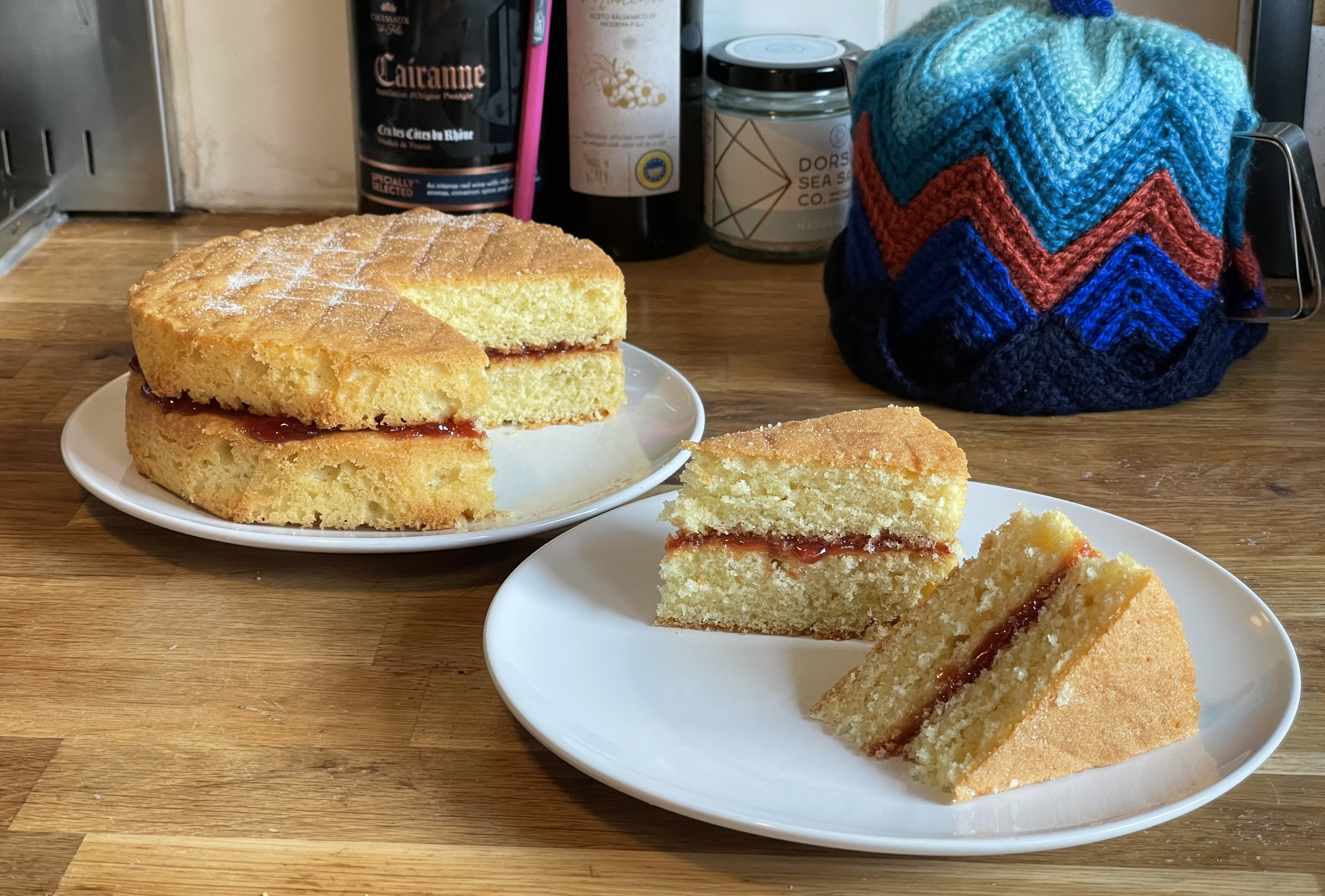
Victoria sponge

The Victoria sponge, also known as the Victoria sandwich cake, was named after Queen Victoria, who was known to enjoy the small cakes with her afternoon tea. The version Queen Victoria ate would have been filled with jam alone, but modern versions often include cream. The top of the cake is not iced or decorated apart from a dusting of powdered sugar. The recipe evolved from the classic pound cake made with equal proportions of flour, butter, sugar and eggs. The invention of baking powder in 1843 by English food manufacturer Alfred Bird in Birmingham allowed the cake to rise higher than was previously possible. Cookery author Felicity Cloake writes that this invention "was celebrated with a patriotic cake"—the Victoria sponge.

A Victoria sponge is made using one of two cake mixing methods. The traditional method involves creaming caster sugar with fat (usually butter), mixing thoroughly with beaten egg, then folding flour and raising agent into the mixture. The modern method, using an electric mixer or food processor, involves simply whisking all the ingredients together until creamy. Additionally, the modern method typically uses an extra-raising agent, and some recipes call for an extra-soft butter or margarine. This basic "cake" mixture serves as the basis for a wide variety of treats and puddings, including cupcakes, chocolate cake, and Eve's pudding.

A similar cake named after American President George Washington is the Washington pie. The traditional recipe for Washington pie is a yellow sandwich cake with jam filling.

== Religious celebrations ==
=== Passover ===
Since sponge cakes are not leavened with yeast, they are popular dessert choices for the Passover feast. Typically, Passover sponges are made with matzo meal, shredded coconut, matzo flour, potato flour, or nut flour (almond, hazelnut etc.) since raw wheat products may not be used. No raising agent may be used due to the strict prohibition of even the appearance of a leavening effect. Therefore, the beating of egg whites in the mix to achieve aeration is an essential characteristic of any Passover sponge recipe. Many families have at least one recipe they pass down through generations, and matzo meal-based cake mixes are available commercially. Several brands are easily found in kosher stores, especially before Passover. Typical flavourings include almonds, apples, dark chocolate, lemon, pecans, and poppy seeds. Apple or orange juice is the liquid ingredient. Milk is avoided because it cannot be included in a dessert to be served after a meat-based meal. The sponge, or a heavier variant in the form of an almond pudding, may be included as an element of the dessert in the Passover meal during the Seder service when it is often combined in serving with a fruit compote.

=== Christmas ===
The Yule log is a Christmas dessert made from a sheet of sponge cake spread with filling and rolled up. It is topped with chocolate to give the appearance of bark. Decorative elements such as mushrooms made of meringue, spun-sugar spiderwebs or crushed pistachios can be added to enhance the cake's finished appearance.

== Gallery ==
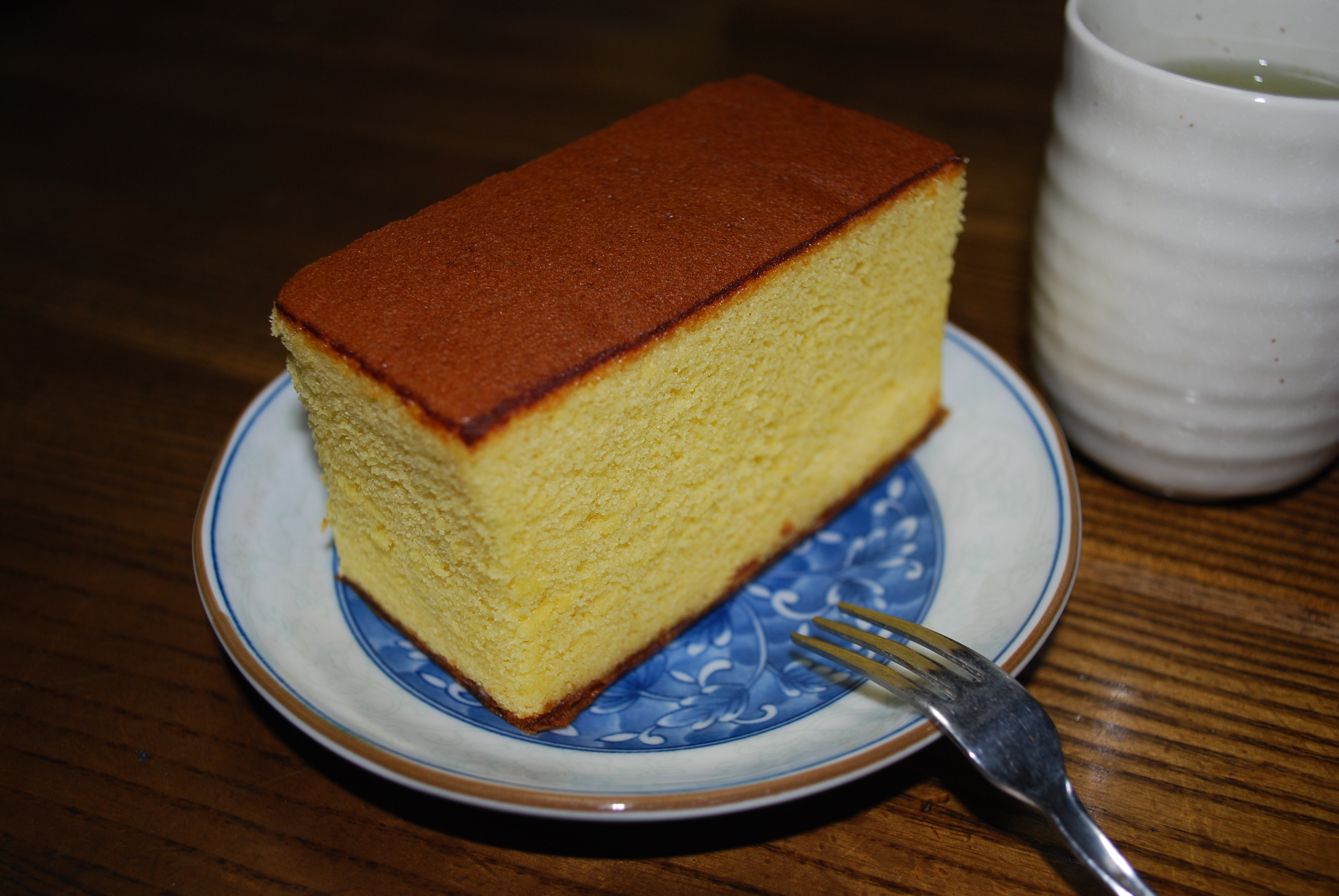
Castella cake, a Japanese variety of Portuguese origin

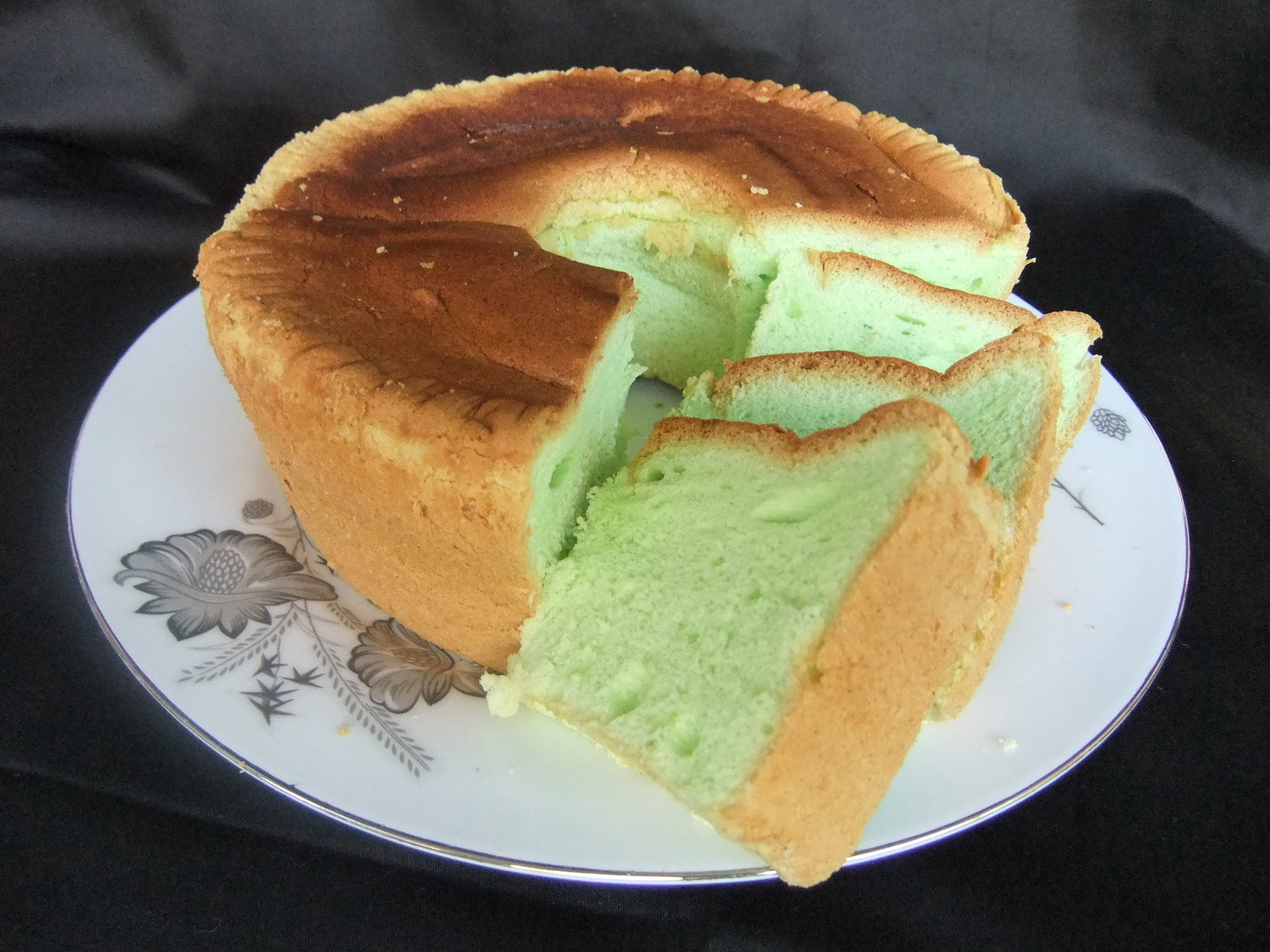
Pandan cake, Southeast Asian origin

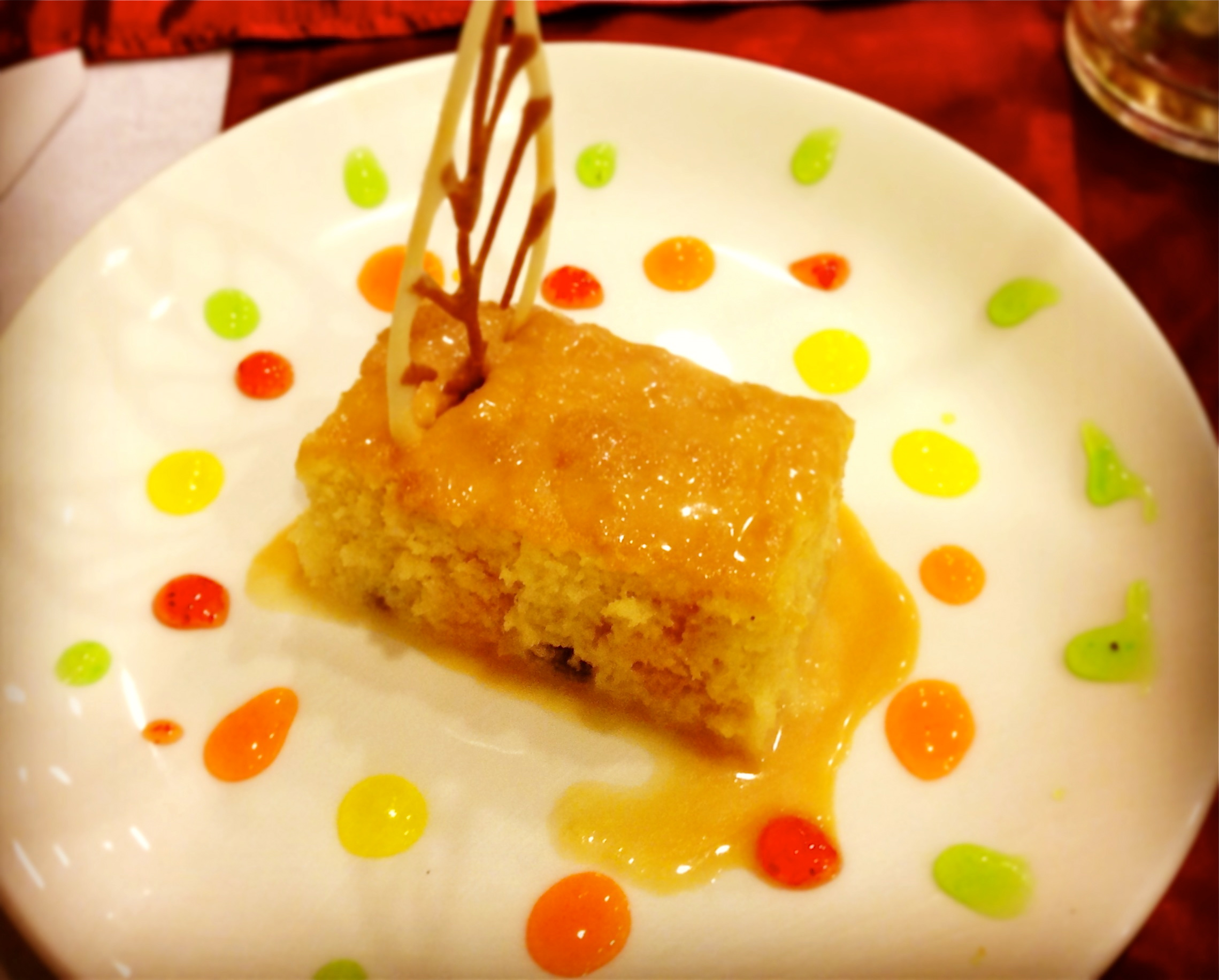
Tres leches cake soaked in evaporated milk, condensed milk and heavy cream

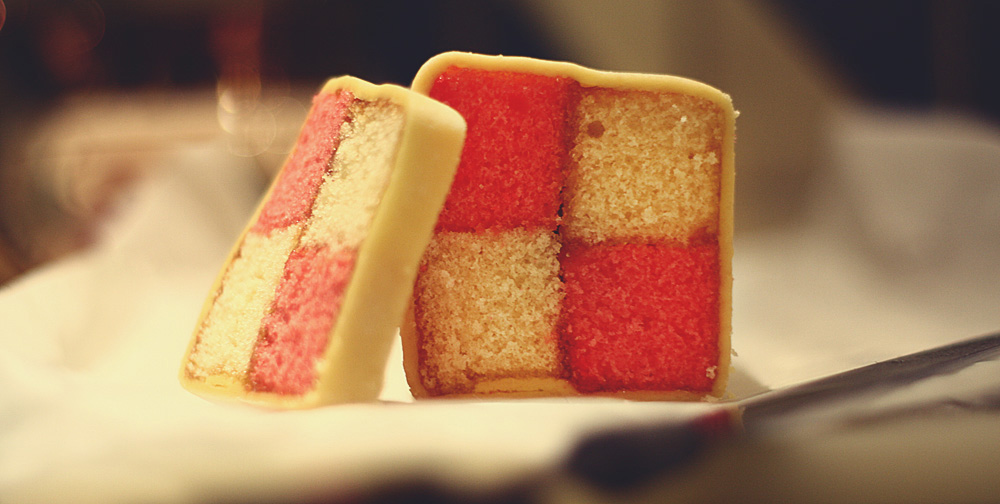
Battenberg cake covered in marzipan displaying a distinctive two-by-two check pattern in its cross-section

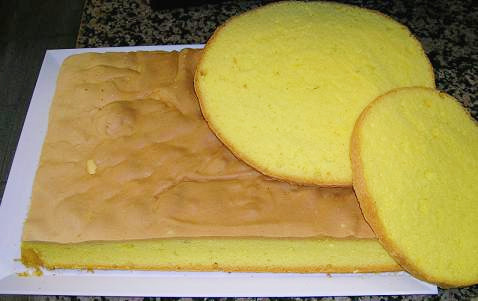
Pan di Spagna is an extremely soft and spongy sweet pastry that is very commonly used in pastry making.

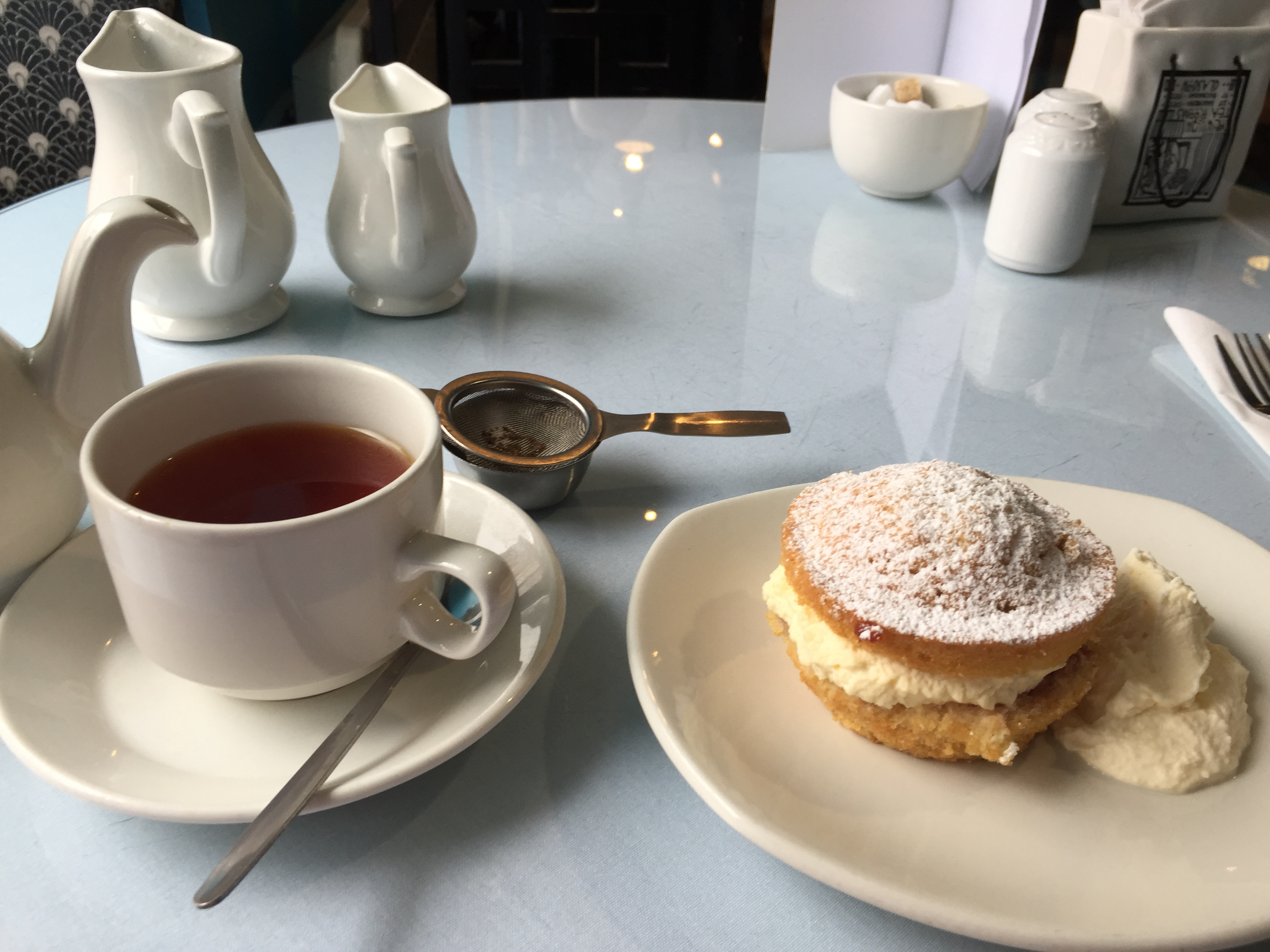
A slice of Victoria Sponge cake and tea at Willow Tearooms

== See also ==
- Bizcocho
- Cake mixing techniques
