= Washington pie =

Jam-filled sandwich cake

- Type: Sponge cake
- Course: Dessert
- Place of origin: United States
- Invented: 1850s
- Main ingredients: Sponge cake, red jelly
- Similar dishes: Boston cream pie

Washington pie is a sandwich cake found in American cuisine. The earliest known recipes date back to the 1850s. It may be an antecedent of Boston cream pie. The earlier Washington pie was made of two yellow sponge cake layers filled with jam and dusted with powdered sugar, later evolving into the better-known chocolate-covered pastry with cream filled version. Raspberry jam was a common choice. Additional flavorings like kirsch or rosewater could be added. Some modern variations use a vanilla cream filling topped with cherry pie filling and whipped cream. The sugar can be sprinkled using a doily to create a decorative pattern.

Slices of Washington pie were sold at stalls at the Northern Liberty Market on Mount Vernon Square until the market was demolished on the orders of Alexander Robey Shepherd in 1872.

Another version, closer to a true pie, was made by soaking pieces of stale and leftover cake with cream and adding raisins and spices and then baking it in pastry crust, always in square pans. It's been described as a "nefarious fraud", but was served at elegant hotels and boarding houses in the Northeastern United States, more commonly than other pies, and it was also sold in quantity by bakers. This version eventually developed a poor reputation during the American Civil War when it started to be sold at coffee stands and other establishments around docks and railroad depots, because "certain bakers, in their efforts to produce great quantities of it, were not so very careful as to what it was composed of. Some bakers got to making it out of stale bread and the like".

Washington pie was served at a Fourth of July celebration in Decatur, Nebraska in 1856. Washington pie was recommended as part of a menu for a Fourth of July party for young ladies in 1901, along with other desserts.

According to a 1934 article published in the Detroit Free Press, the cake layers could be made with cottage pudding instead of traditional sponge cake.

== See also ==
- List of cakes
- Victoria sandwich – similar British cake
- Bread pudding – dessert made with stale cake or bread and soaked with cream before baking
