= Malay sponge cake =

Chinese dessert cake

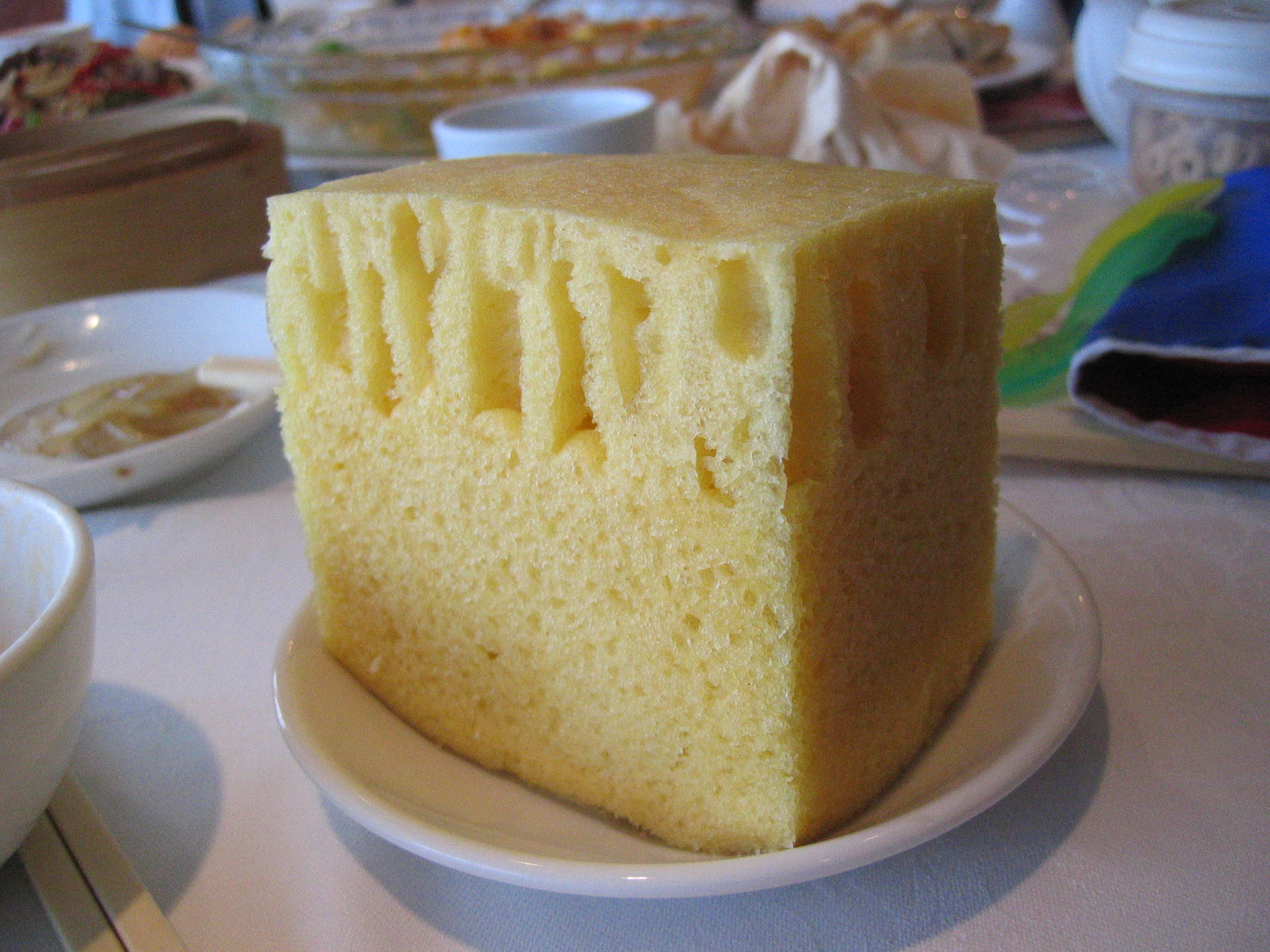
- Malay sponge cake at a Cantonese restaurant
- Alternative names: Mah Lai Goh, Ma Lai Go, Ma Lai Gao, Ma La Gao, Malay cake, and others
- Course: Dim sum, xiaochi
- Place of origin: China, Malaysia
- Region or state: China (Guangdong), Hong Kong, Macau, Malaysia, Singapore, Cambodia, Laos, Thailand
- Main ingredients: Traditionally made with levain, flour, white sugar and eggs

Malay sponge cake (Note: simplified Chinese: 马拉糕; traditional Chinese: 馬拉糕; pinyin: mǎlāgāo; Jyutping: maa5 laai1 gou1) or (simplified Chinese: 马来糕; traditional Chinese: 馬來糕; pinyin: mǎláigāo; Jyutping: maa5 loi4 gou1) and known as ma lai go in Cantonese and ma lai gao in Mandarin) is a dessert cake popular in Guangdong and Hong Kong, where it is usually served at traditional teahouses. The cake is made of lard or butter, flour, and eggs, and prepared using a bamboo steamer to develop puffiness. An entire Malay sponge cake is a huge round yellow cake, but is generally sold as slices in teahouses. In Hong Kong, the cake was described as the "national cake" by American news channel CNN.

== History and development ==
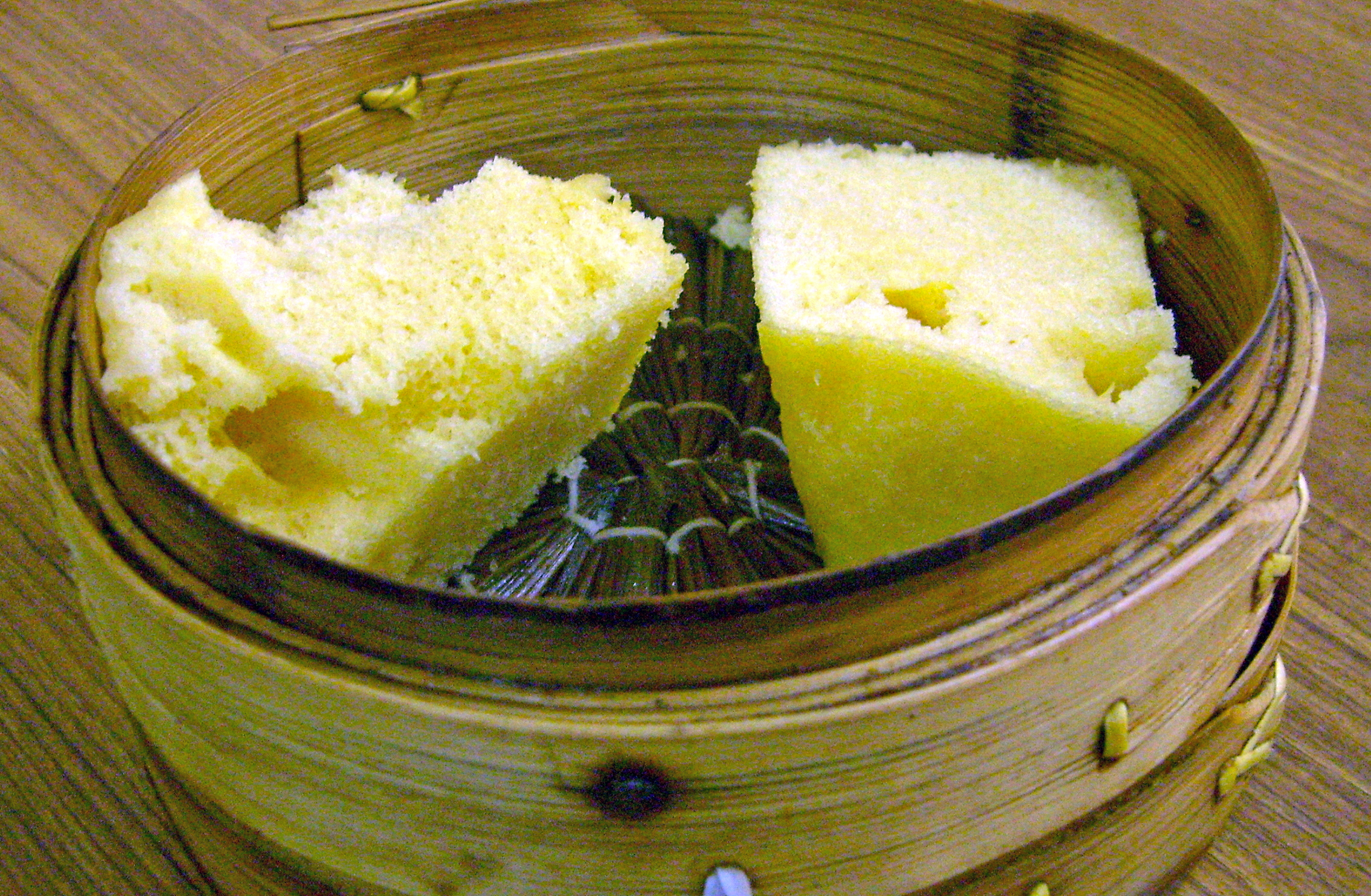
Malay sponge cake in a bamboo steamer

There are three main hypotheses about Malay sponge cake's area of origin. The first one is that Malay sponge cake comes from Guangdong in China and was then brought to Malaysia through the second Chinese immigration wave in Malaya history during the British-ruled period. The second hypothesis is that Malay sponge cake has developed from a British dessert and was then taken back to China by Chinese immigration. The third hypothesis is that Malay sponge cake was developed from Castile cake, which was brought by Portuguese sailors to the Nanyang region and then back to China by an early immigrant from Guangdong province.

=== From Guangdong to Malaysia ===
From the early 1930s, thousands of Chinese immigrants came to Malaya during the British-ruled period while trying to escape the poverty in China. This was the second Chinese immigration wave in Malaya history and was also considered the most enormous influx of immigration to Malaysia. Most of the Chinese immigration during that time came from Fujian and Guangdong provinces in the south-east coast of China. This largest immigration population brought with it various languages and cultures, such as Cantonese and Cantonese cuisine, into Malaysia and thus laid the foundation for the cultural diversity of Malaysia today. Malaysia today is a multicultural country, and their food culture is deeply influenced by multiculturalism. Malaysian cuisines are diverse and include features brought by immigrants from different countries. In Malaysia, tourists can find various foods from all over the world, and Chinese food is probably most varied in Malaysia. Malay sponge cake and other foods, such as Bah Kut Teh, are also popular in Malaysia. Therefore, it is reasonable to consider that Malay sponge cake came from Guangdong in China and was then brought to Malaysia.

=== From Malaysia to China ===
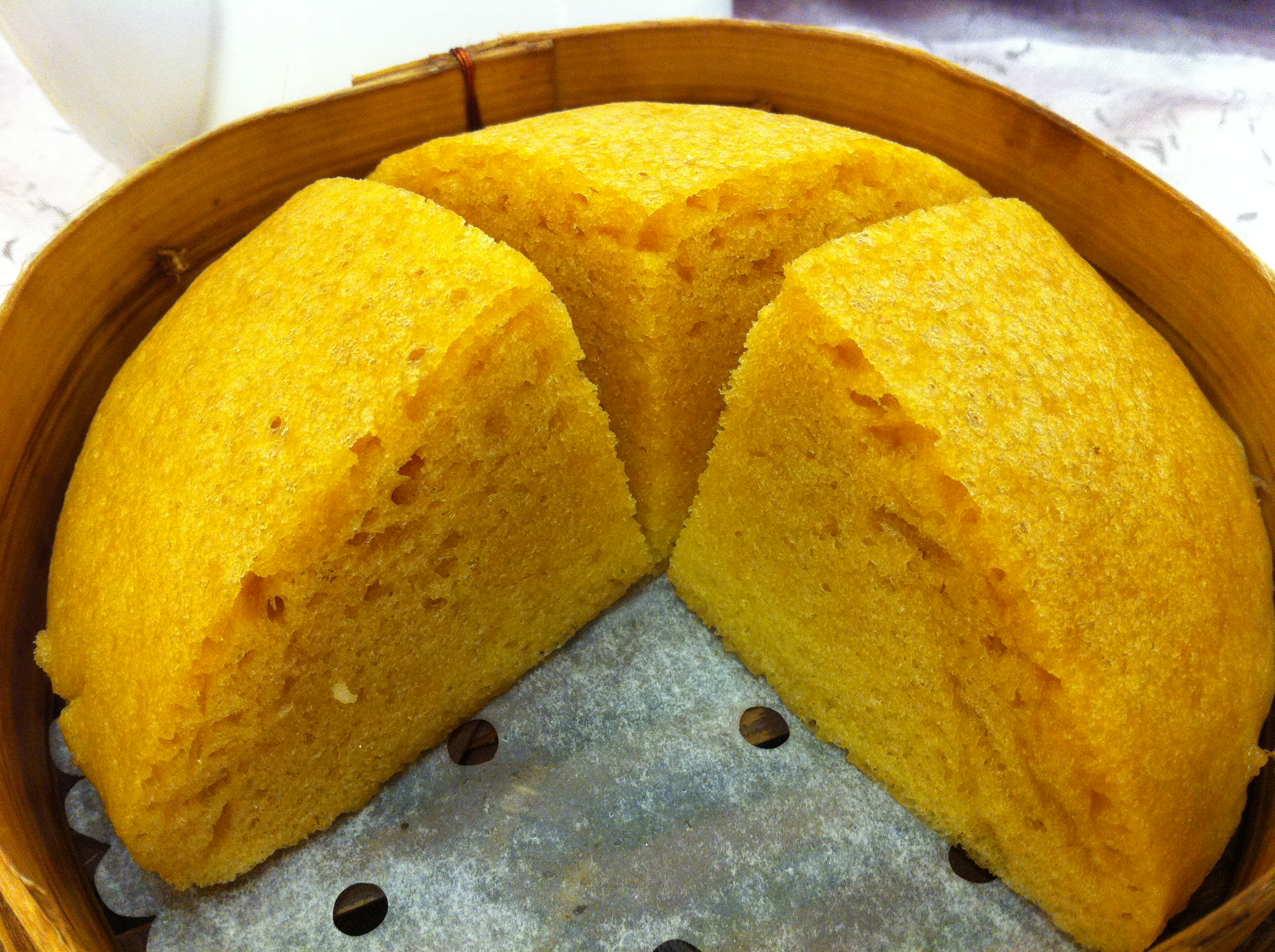
Malay sponge cake, or mah lai goh, is similar in appearance to some western cakes.

In the British Malaysian era, English colonists still retained the habit of drinking afternoon tea with cake. However, because the ingredients (like milk) and cooking props (like ovens) that Westerners used were not common in Malaysia, locals used coconut milk and steamers instead and made a different version of the English cake, which is the Malay sponge cake. During the British Malaysian era, there were many immigrants from Guangdong province who were frequently travelling between Malaysia and mainland China. It is also reasonable that Malay sponge cake was popular in English cuisine and was then brought back to China by Chinese immigration at that time.

=== From Portugal to China ===
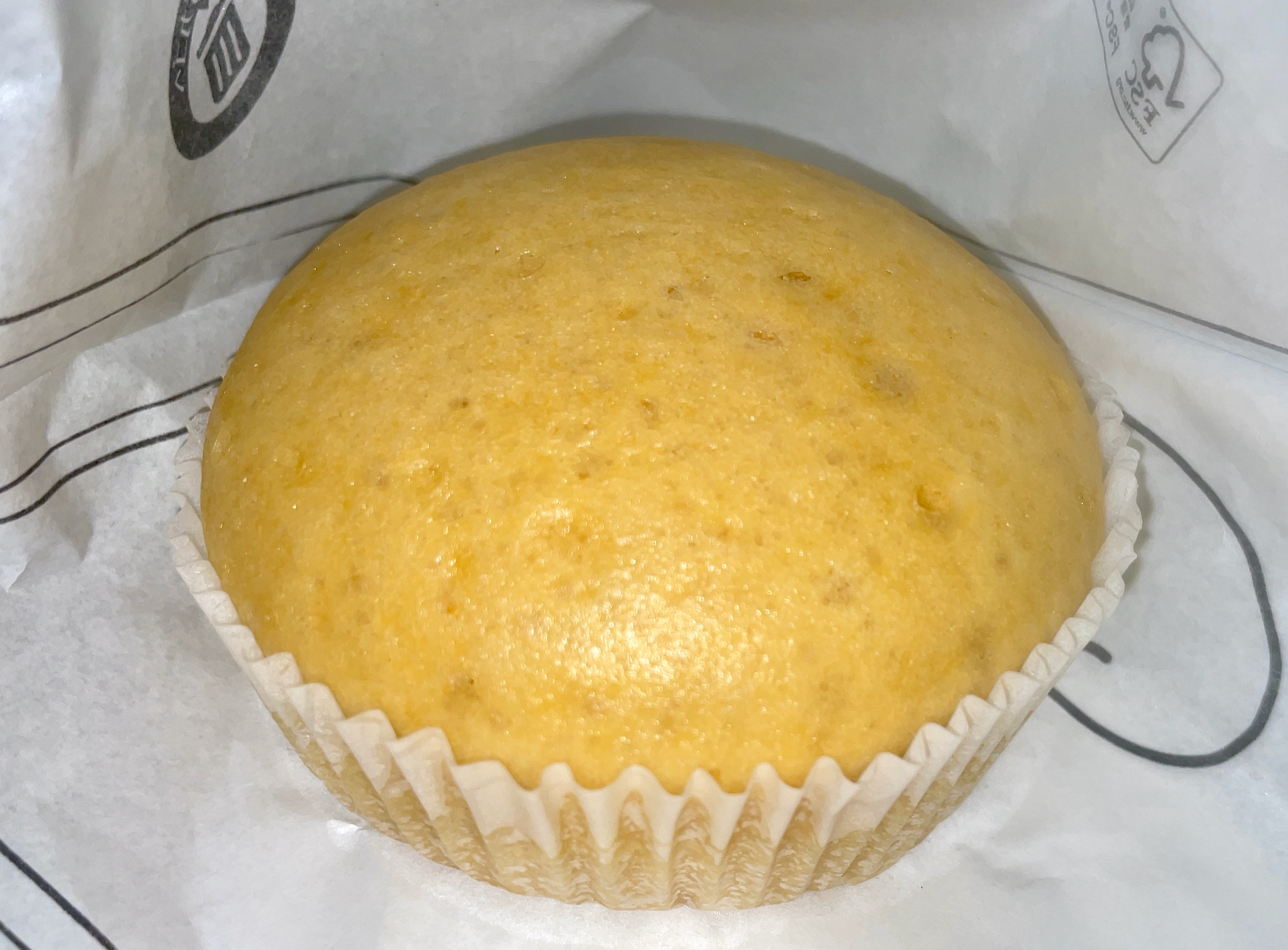
Malay sponge cake sold by convenience store FamilyMart in Japan

The sponge cake came from West to East in the 16-17 century. In the mid-16th century, Portugal was also one of the world's leading maritime trading powers. Many minor nobles and non-eldest sons of the urban bourgeoisie would set sail on ships and attempt to get rich anywhere in Brazil, Africa, India, or the South Pacific, and the new Castilla bread was brought aboard. Sponge cakes last longer because they are dehydrated, compared to many noble foods that were complicated to make and difficult to preserve, and were a valuable and tasteful enjoyment for the food shortage of the far sea travel. At that time, the Malacca base in the Nanyang region was fairly secure for the Portuguese. Numerous merchant ships from Europe and Asia were often spotted there, allowing more Asians to come into contact with sponge cakes, and giving them experience to master the craft. The early immigrants from Guangdong to the south of the ocean accounted for many of these bakers. In traditional Chinese cuisine however, there were no western baking skills. Therefore, producers at that time often steamed buns in the traditional way. Although the ingredients were still flour, eggs, and butter from Europe, the result was more like steamed bread than cake. This unusual strange food was given the title "Malay cake" after it was introduced in Guangdong during the late Qing dynasty. Later, a more local version of lard or butter replaced the original butter and became a Cantonese tea classic, "Malay sponge cake".

== Popularity ==
Malay sponge cake is one of the most popular cakes in Hong Kong. Malay sponge cake has even been considered Hong Kong's national cake by CNN.

The cake is commonly served during Chinese New Year, where its golden-brown color symbolizes prosperity. Its name includes the character "go" (糕), which is a homophone for 高, meaning "growth" or "advancement," further reinforcing its association with good fortune.

== Ingredients ==
There are several approaches to make Malay sponge cake with different tastes. There is the traditional approach, as well as some special approaches (e.g., Brown sugar and Coconut milk flavored Malay sponge cake and Honey flavoured Malay sponge cake).

Malay sponge cake is traditionally made with levain, all-purpose flour, custard powder, milk powder, aluminium-free baking powder, baking soda solution, white sugar and eggs. Levain (also called "lao mian" in Chinese) is usually made with water, beer, and cake flour. One variant of Malay sponge cake is using brown sugar instead of white sugar. Using coconut milk to replace milk is also a variant in making Malay sponge cake. More modern innovations include honey.

== Serving ==
Traditionally, Malay sponge cake is a kind of dim sum (à la carte item) or "xiaochi" (snack). The cakes are served hot in the bamboo steamer in which they were steamed, usually on a bed of dried leaves or paper mat. Around Guangdong, Malay sponge cake is usually served as a dish during traditional Cantonese tea time.
