= Foam cake =

American classification of cake

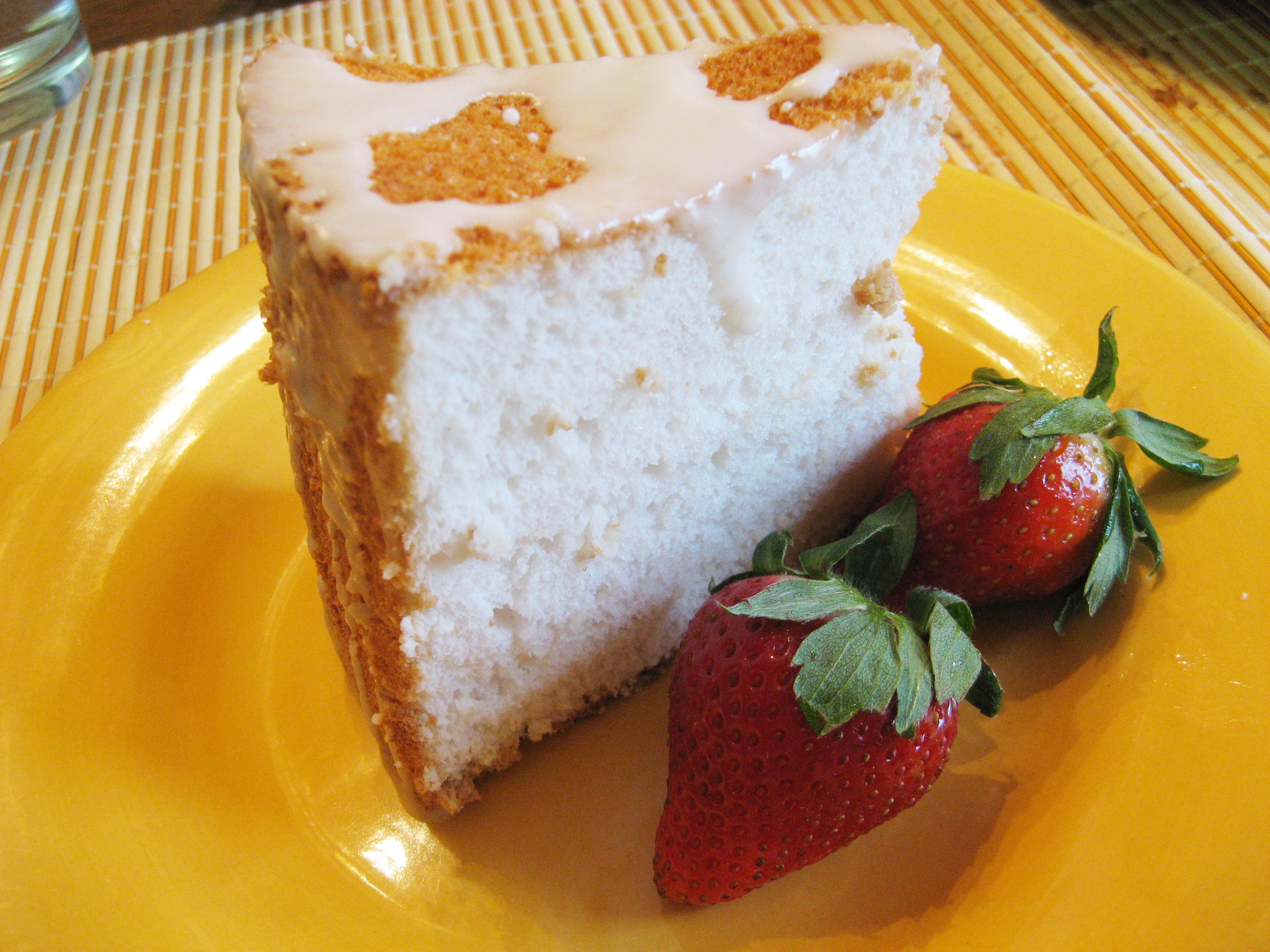
- Angel food cake is a type of foam cake
- Type: Cake
- Main ingredients: Flour, egg whites

Foam cakes are cakes with very little (if any) fatty material such as butter, oil or shortening. Foam, sponge or unshortened cakes are distinguished by their large proportion of foamed eggs and/or egg whites to a small proportion of sugar and wheat flour. The term is North American centric, with the British and Australian culinary term for this type of cake being a whisked sponge cake.

Foam cakes are leavened primarily by the air that is beaten into the egg whites that they contain. They differ from butter cakes, which contain shortening, and baking powder or baking soda for leavening purposes. Foam cakes are typically airy, light and spongy.

After it is baked, the cake and the pan are flipped down on a sheet pan with parchment paper in order for them to cool down at the same rate.

Examples of foam cakes are angel food cake, meringue, genoise, and chiffon cake.

== See also ==
- Cake mixing techniques
