= Frances Virginia Tea Room =

Restaurant information
- Established: 1927
- Owner: Frances Virginia Wikle Whitaker
- Food type: Southern Cuisine
- Location: Peachtree Street, Atlanta, Fulton, Georgia, United States
- Seating capacity: 350

The Frances Virginia Tea Room was a dining establishment in Atlanta, Georgia, open from 1927 to 1962. Founded and owned by Frances Virginia Wikle Whitaker, an experienced dietician, the restaurant was exceptionally popular. Staff served around 2,000 people daily- an estimated 1% of Atlanta's population at the time.

== History ==
The Frances Virginia Tearoom was originally opened on Poplar St, but on May 29, 1932, Whitaker moved the operation to the Collier Building at the corner of Peachtree and Ellis. The billboard featured an Art Deco style silhouette of Frances, along with a pink-and-green neon sign advertising the name. This color scheme continued through the restaurant, referring to Atlanta's many dogwood trees. The new location included 350 seats and featured sound-absorbing tiles on the ceiling to facilitate easy conversation among patrons.

=== Frances Virginia Wikle Whitaker ===
Frances Virginia Wikle was born in Cartersville, Georgia in 1895 to an upper-middle-class family. She, her parents, and five siblings moved to Marietta, Georgia in 1897, where Whitaker stayed until deciding to pursue secondary education. She studied at both Wesleyan College and Georgia Normal and Industrial College (GNIC), graduating in 1917 with a diploma in Collegiate Industrial Home Economics. She remained at GNIC as a professor until moving to New York City in 1919 to complete a dietic internship at City Hospital on Blackwell Island. After she completed this internship in the 1920s, she moved back to Atlanta and used her new experience in the medical field to secure a position as the head of Piedmont Hospital's first dietic program.

On July 27, 1927, Frances Virginia Wikle opened the Frances Virginia Tea Room. Six months later, she married William Toxey Whitaker and became Frances Virginia Wikle Whitaker. The couple went on to have one son, Toxey Jr.. She served as the general manager of the Tearoom until 1944 when she retired due to health concerns. Frances Virginia Wikle Whitaker died from cancer in 1962.

==== Community impact ====
During her tenure as General manager at the Frances Virginia Tea Room, Whitaker continued business relationships that she fostered at Piedmont Hospital. Her formal dietic training led to various leadership positions with the Atlanta Association of Better Restaurants, where she focused on implementing sanitation initiatives for both food and workers. During the Great Depression, Whitaker is also reported to have distributed an estimated amount of $1 million in food to families in need.

=== Admin and staffing ===
Many of the women in Frances Virginia Wikle Whitaker's family had backgrounds in secretarial work, banking, and home economics, and Whitaker involved them in her business: her mother was a hostess and cashier, and she would later involve her sisters and nieces as partners. This was especially significant because Tea Rooms were one of the few ways women were able to generate an income at the time.

While Black American customers would not have been permitted to dine in the restaurant due to racial segregation laws, it is documented that Whitaker did hire Black staff in the capacity of both kitchen and service workers. Notably for the time, staff benefits and pay were the same for workers of any race. These benefits were also unusually generous for the time and, in addition to hourly pay, included uniforms, laundry service, two meals a day, and life insurance.

=== Transfer of ownership and closure ===
In 1944, Whitaker decided to retire and transferred majority ownership to her sister, Hooper Beck. Other owners controlled smaller shares- notably Agnes Coleman, the Head Dietitian at Emory University Hospital. Coleman ensured that the focus remained on serving nutritional, high-quality food. Beck eventually sold her shares, but the Frances Virginia Tea Room continued to serve customers until 1962 when Coleman sold the restaurant and all its wares to the building's owner.

== Menu and service ==
The Frances Virginia Tea Room served a variety of foods, but the emphasis was always on nutrition. Very few fried foods or heavy sauces were on the menu. Common offerings included salads, fresh fruits and vegetables, grilled meats, and seafood. Plenty of dessert choices were also featured, such as fruit shortcake, a prune whip with sherry-infused custard, and various ice cream sundae desserts.

=== Hours and specials ===
According to newspaper articles at the time, the restaurant featured the following business hours:

- 11:30 am–2:30 pm – Luncheon (Average cost between $0.35-$0.50)
- 3:00 pm–5:00 pm – Afternoon Tea
- 5:00 pm–8:00 pm – Dinner (Average cost between $0.75-$1.00)

Specials were also offered as an incentive to increase business, such as a popular "two-for-one" deal. Children's menus are doubled as entertainment and can be folded into masks. These young guests could also expect a treat of animal crackers once they finished their meal.

=== Cookbook ===
Agnes Coleman's niece, Mildred Huff-Coleman, published The South's Legendary Frances Virginia Tea Room Cookbook, a collection of original recipes from the tearoom. This includes items such as Eggbread, a lighter version of cornbread made with cornmeal, flour, egg, buttermilk, baking powder.

== See also ==
- Women in business
- History of Atlanta
- Cuisine of the Southern United States
- Teahouse
- Mary Mac's Tea Room
