= Cake mixing techniques =

Methods for preparing cake batter

There are several common cake mixing techniques.

== List of cake mixing techniques ==
=== High-fat methods ===
Creaming

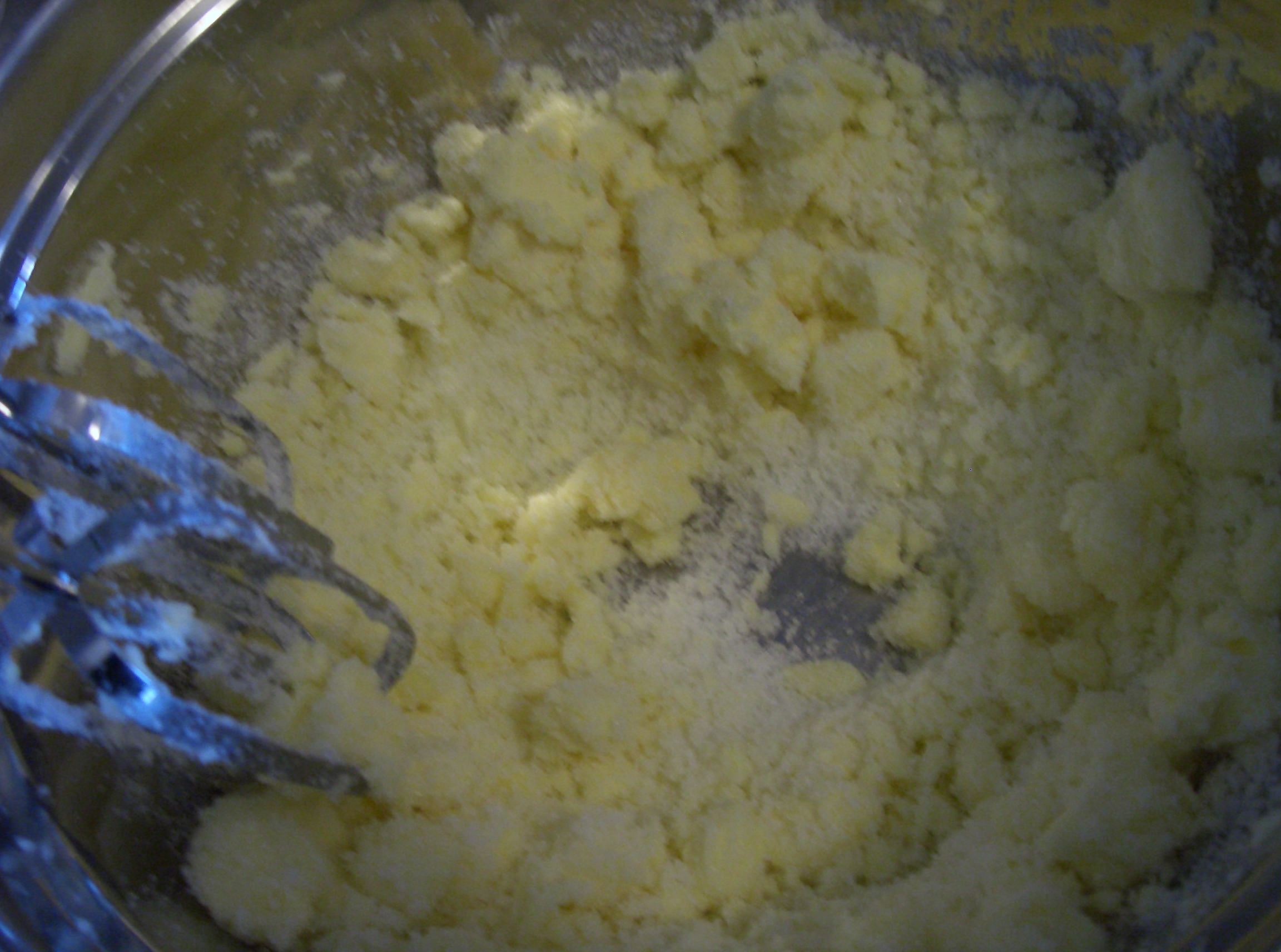
Creaming together butter and sugar

Also called the conventional method. It is a common method and typical for butter cakes and similar high-fat cakes. This depends upon a solid but malleable, or "plastic" fat, such as butter or vegetable shortening. The fat and sugar are creamed together until well-blended and light in color. Eggs are beaten in until the mixture is fluffy. After that, dry ingredients are stirred in, alternating with any remaining liquid ingredients. Leaveners such as baking powder are commonly used. The flour is added late, which reduces the chance of developing the gluten and producing a tough cake.
Reverse creaming
Also called the paste method, and related to Betty Crocker's double-quick method from the 1950s. Solid fat and dry ingredients are beaten together until well-blended. Then liquids are stirred in, followed by eggs. The resulting cake is tender, unlikely to become tough from overbeating, and tends not to dome (form a rounded top when baked, which can be awkward for assembling tall layer cakes). Cook's Illustrated also recommends this method for shortbread cookies.
Stirring

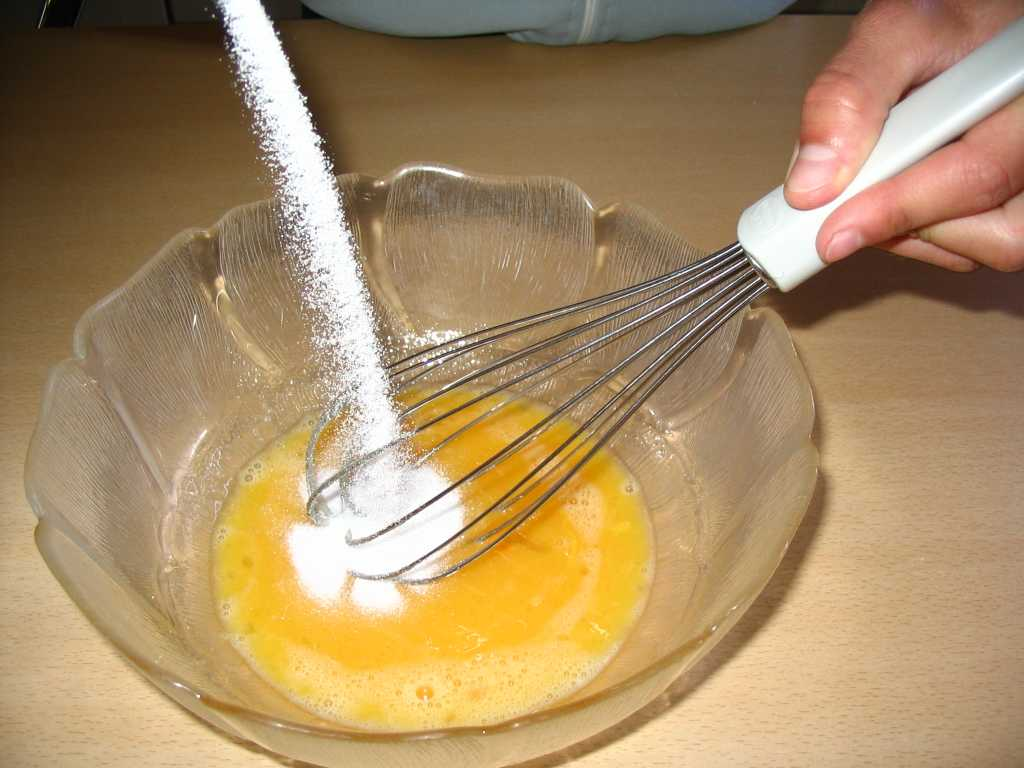
A stirred batter

Also called the blending method, or the dumping method, because the ingredients are dumped in a bowl and stirred together. (Dump cake itself, however, depends upon a cake mix instead of a mixing technique.) Typical of a cake made in the style of quick bread, the stirring technique usually relies on liquid fats, such as oil. Wacky cake is a vegan, eggless, butter-less, milk-less, oil-based cocoa-flavored cake from the Great Depression that uses the stirring method.
Two-stage method
More common for making high-ratio cakes (i.e., a cake whose recipe calls for more sugar by weight than flour) in commercial settings, the two-stage method uses an emulsified high-ratio shortening. The dry ingredients are first mixed with the shortening, and then the eggs and other liquids are beaten in. The resulting batter is usually thin enough to pour (rather than scrape) into a cake pan.
One-stage method
A stirring method that uses high-ratio liquid shortening. It is called one-stage because all the ingredients can be put in the bowl at the same time, and then the batter is stirred.
Flour-batter method
Sugar and eggs are beaten together in one bowl until thick and light. The fat and the remaining dry ingredients are mixed together until thoroughly combined in a second bowl. Then the sugar–egg mixture and the fat–flour mixture are mixed together, and any remaining liquid ingredients are stirred in.

=== Egg foam methods ===
Egg foam methods often use cake flour or add corn starch to reduce the risk of the cake becoming tough.

Sponge method

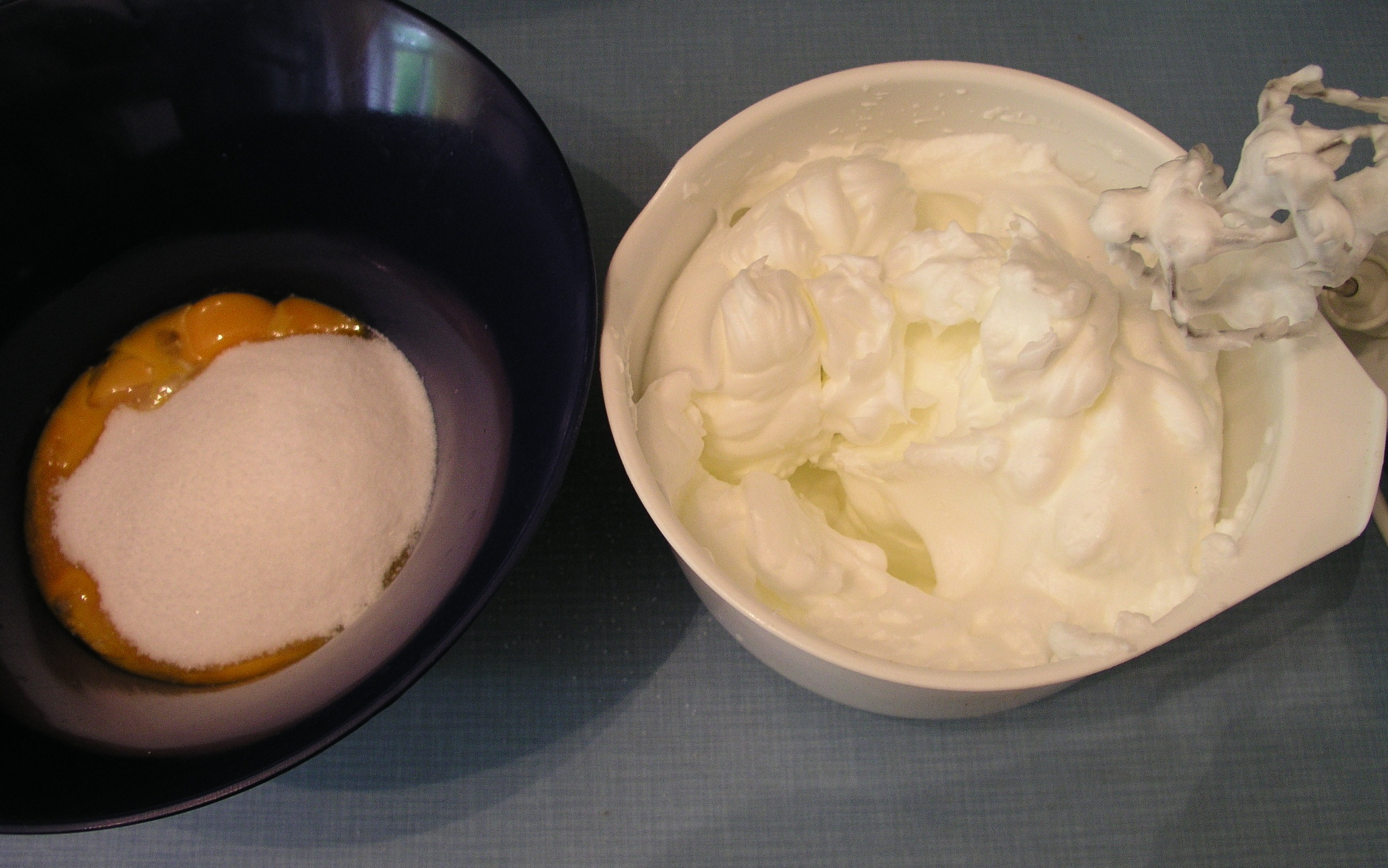
Egg whites have been whipped, and egg yolks are waiting to be beaten with white sugar. This combination is used for a variation on the sponge method.

A genoise or sponge cake is a versatile, usually low-fat cake that is used as the basis for many fancier cakes as well as jelly roll cakes. In its simplest form, sugar and whole eggs are whipped into a light foam, and then flour is folded in. The resulting batter is promptly poured into a cake pan and baked. As the eggs gain greater volume when warm, the eggs may be initially beaten over a bowl of hot water.
Variations include the addition of melted butter at the end, for an American-style butter geniose, the addition of hot milk to the melted butter to produce a hot milk cake, or beating egg whites and egg yolks separately.
Angel food method

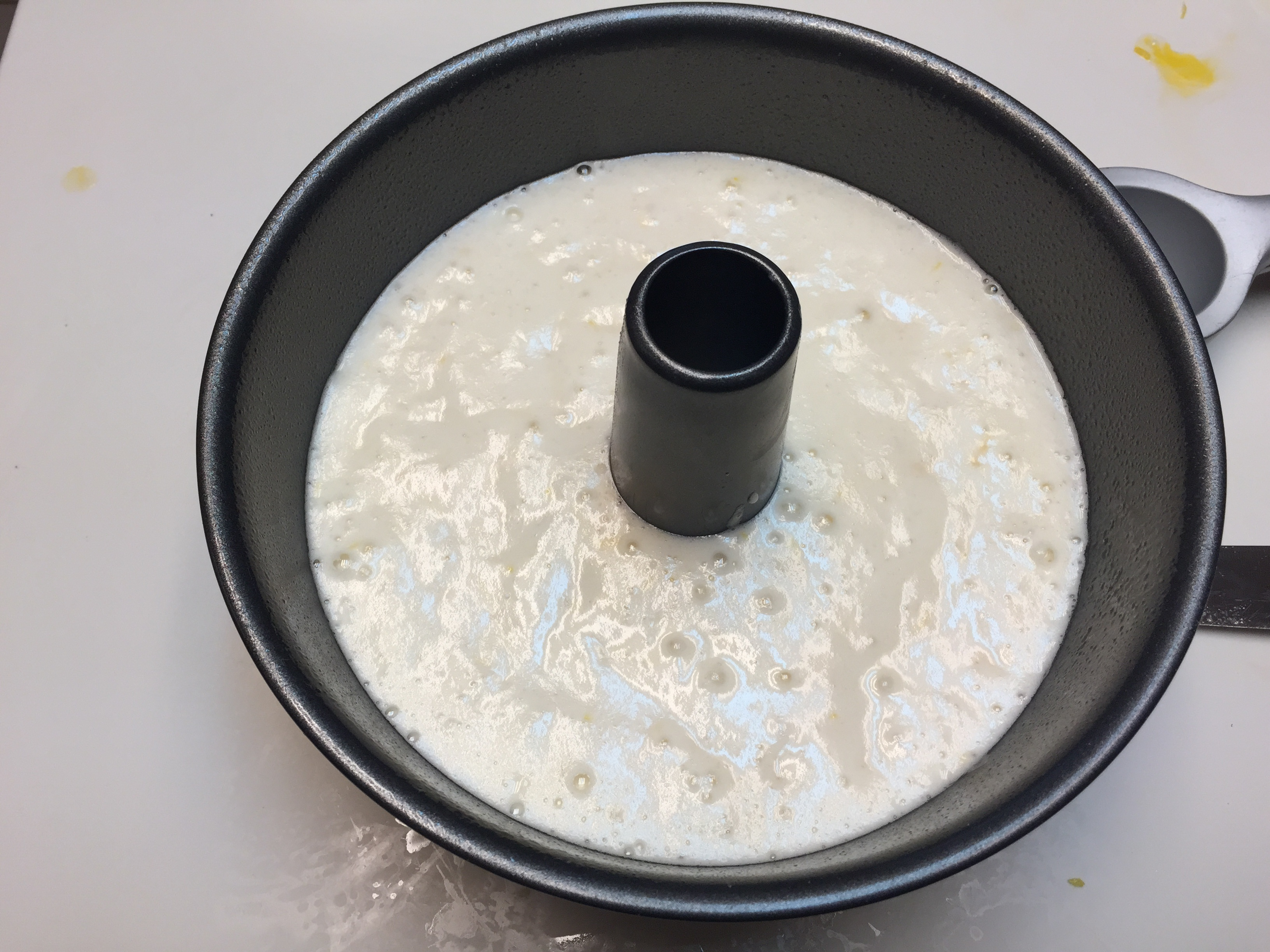
Angel food cake batter in the pan. A special, smooth-sided tube pan is used for angel food cakes.

Used to make an angel food cake and little else. This is fat-free cake. Egg whites are beaten to soft peaks, and then a dry mixture of flour and sugar is gently folded in. Because the flour is added in the last step, there is a lower chance of the gluten developing and producing a tough cake. The beaten egg whites are the only source of leavening. Once out of the oven, the cake is usually inverted and left upside down until it is completely cooled. This reduces the risk that the fragile cake will fall, or collapse. A specialized fork or cutter with long tines, sometimes called an angel food comb, is traditionally used to break apart this light, airy cake.
Chiffon method
Used to make chiffon cakes. Another egg foam method, this one is similar to the angel food method except that the egg whites are beaten until stiff and then folded with a batter containing not just dry flour and sugar, but also oil, egg yolks, and baking powder.
Joconde method
A Joconde cake is a type of sponge cake that is made by separately beating egg whites and egg yolks with sugar. It also includes nuts.

=== Other ===
It is also possible to combine some methods. For example, some recipes combine the creaming and sponge methods. Such a cake might begin by creaming together butter and sugar, and then fold in stiffly beaten egg whites as a substitute for chemical leaveners.

== See also ==
- Quick bread#Mixing methods
