= Plum cake =

Range of cakes made with dried or fresh fruit

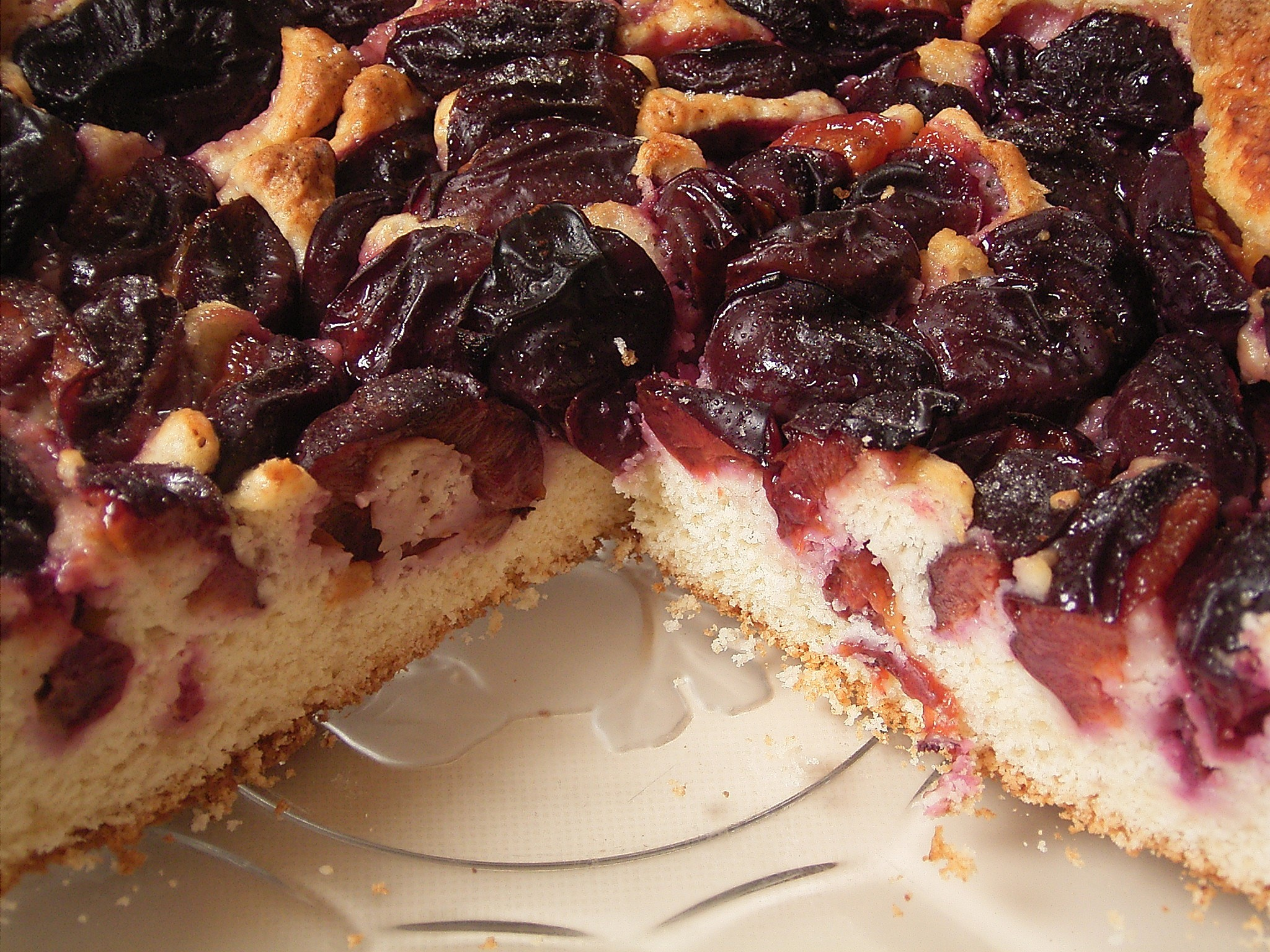
- A plum cake with plums baked inside and atop the cake
- Type: Cake
- Course: Dessert
- Place of origin: England
- Serving temperature: Cold or warmed
- Main ingredients: currants, raisins, or prune fruit and cake batter
- Similar dishes: Fruitcake

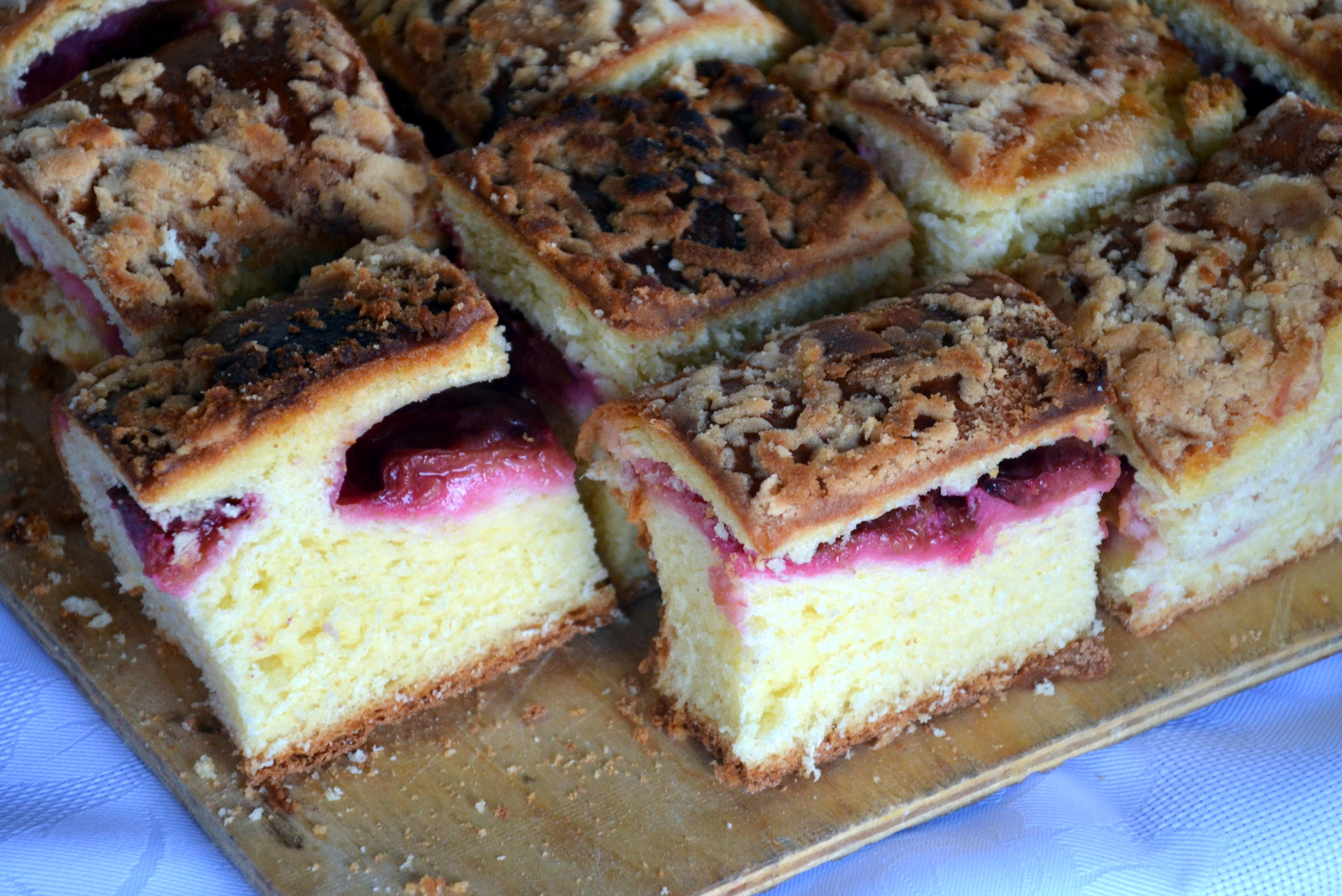
Slices of plum cake with a plum filling

Plum cake refers to a wide range of cakes usually made with dried fruits such as currants, raisins, sultanas, or prunes, and also sometimes with fresh fruits. There is a wide range of popular plum cakes and puddings. Since the meaning of the word "plum" has changed over time, many items referred to as plum cakes and popular in England since at least the eighteenth century have now become known as fruitcake. The English variety of plum cake also exists on the European mainland, but may vary in ingredients and consistency. British colonists and missionaries brought the dried fruit variety of cake with them, for example, in British India where it was served around the time of the Christmas holiday season. In America's Thirteen Colonies, where it became associated with elections, one version came to be called election cake.

Plum cakes made with fresh plums came with other migrants elsewhere, in which plum cake is prepared using plum as a primary ingredient. In some versions, the plums may become jam-like inside the cake after cooking, or the cake may be prepared using plum jam. Plum cake prepared with plums is also a part of Ashkenazi Jewish cuisine, and is referred to as Pflaumenkuchen or Zwetschgenkuchen. Other plum-based cakes are found in French, Italian and Polish cooking.

== Terms ==
The term "plum cake" and "fruit cake" have become interchangeable. Since dried fruit is used as a sweetening agent and any dried fruit used to be described as "plums", many plum cakes and plum puddings do not contain the plum fruit now known by that name. (Plum pudding is a similar, richer dish prepared with similar ingredients, cooked by steaming the mixture rather than baking it.) The term "plum" originally referred to prunes, raisins or grapes. Thus the so-called plums from which English plum puddings are made "were always raisins, not the plump juicy fruits that the name suggests today."

In Old English, the term plūme was "from medieval Latin pruna, from Latin prunum," which equated to "prune". Prune in modern French means plum, so plum tarts have names such as tarte aux prunes. In English, prunes are dried plums, and when modern cakes use them as a primary ingredient, they may be referred to as a plum cake or type of plum cake.

== By region ==
=== Britain ===
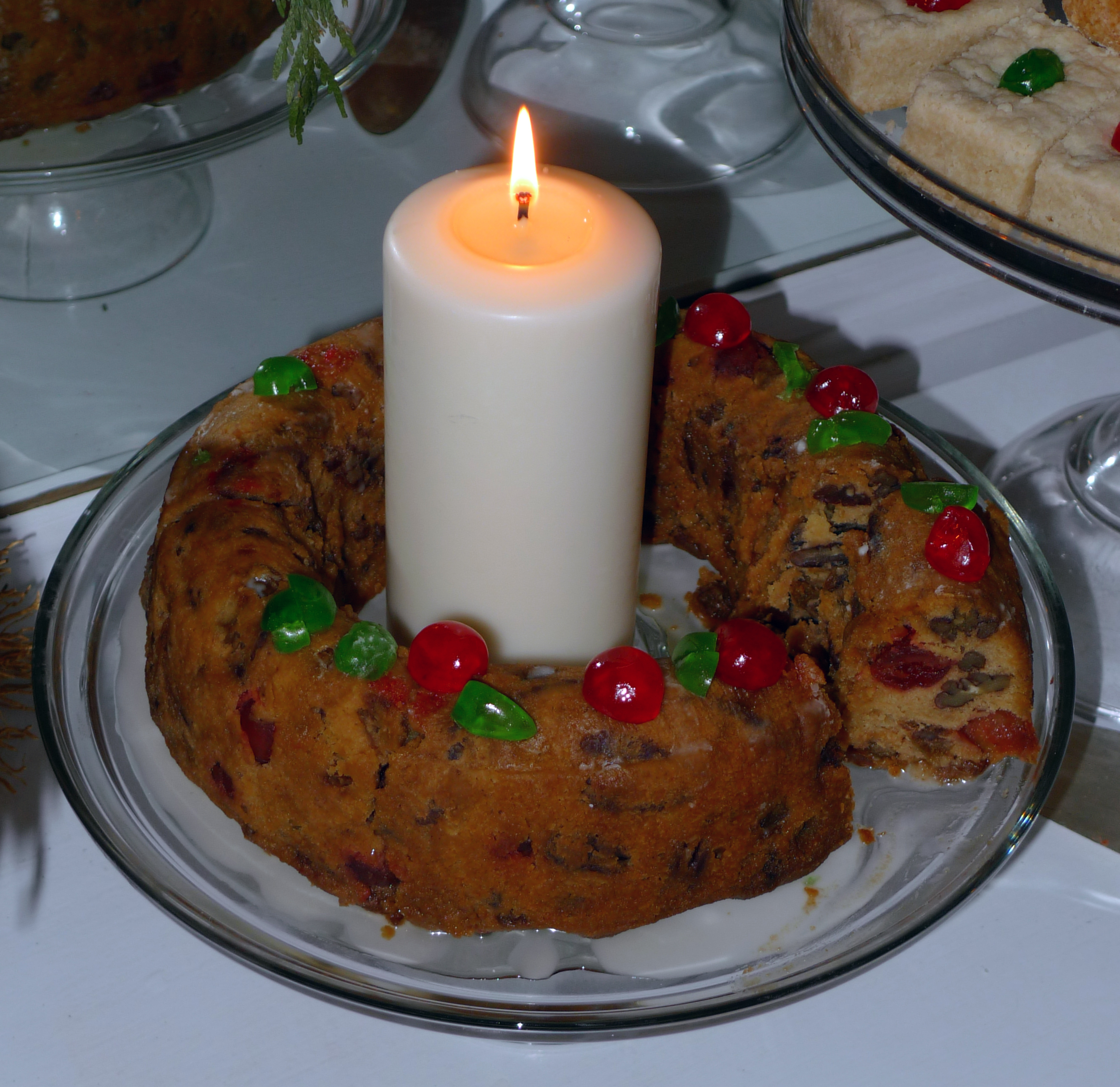
A traditional type of fruitcake

Plum cake has historically referred to an early type and style of fruitcake in England since around 1700. Raisins and currants were used, which in the English language were referred to as plums since around 1660. The various types of dried fruit (chiefly currants and raisins) were familiar to English kitchens through trade with The Levant and Mediterranean, but before they became available in the modern era through "trouble-free" imports from Australia, South Africa, and California, preparing them required "an immense amount of labour ... on account of the rough and ready methods by which the fruit was picked, dried, packed and exported".

In 1881 Colonel Henry-Herbert said that "a good English plum cake...is a national institution". At times, Thomas Carlyle was one among many who ate a light style of plum cake with tea, into which he would dip the cake, which he described as bun-like with currants "dotted here and there". Elizabeth David wrote that "Christmas mincemeat and Christmas plum pudding and cake are all such typical examples of the English fondness for spiced fruit mixtures that it seems almost unnecessary to include recipes for them ..."

Plum cakes were raised by whipping air into the cake batter, rather than by the use of yeast. A range of plum cakes and puddings were published in the popular Book of Household Management (published 1859–1861) by Isabella Beeton. Mrs Beeton included recipes for "A Common Plum Cake" and "A Nice Plum Cake" as well as "Baked Plum-Pudding", "An Unrivalled Plum-Pudding", "A Plain Christmas Pudding for Children", "Plum-Pudding of Fresh Fruit", "Plum Tart", "Christmas Plum-Pudding", "A Pound Plum Pudding" and "Christmas Cake". The comment in an Indian Household Management book is indicative both of the reach of Mrs Beeton's book as well as the range of interpretations of plum cake and plum pudding. The author says, "Mrs Beeton’s recipe is by far the best if modified a little: 12 units of manukka raisins ..."

Up to World War I, cakes, including plum cakes, were baked along with loaves of bread. "A smaller cake or pasty might be slipped in or pulled out after the baking had begun, but a raised pie with well-protected sides, or a large plum cake, would take at least the same time as the loaves, and experienced housewives made them in sizes to do so."

=== Europe ===
The English variety of plum cake also exists on the European mainland, although "plum cake" there more usually refers to baked cakes made with fresh fruit rather than dried.

In French cooking, plums are an ingredients in a significant tradition of cake making: "...throughout the districts of the Loire, the Dordogne, the Lot and the Périgord, there [was] hardly a celebration, a wedding feast or celebration at which the dessert [did] not include some sort of plum or mirabelle tart, made with fresh or dried plums or jam according to the season." The Mirabelle plum is a specific cultivar used to make Tarte aux mirabelles (plum tart). A Galette aux fruits is a type of galette made with yeast dough and covered with cooked fruit in season, such as plums (or quinces, apples, apricots). The fruit in these open tarts or flans is cut into suitably sized pieces and the cake is glazed: red glaze is recommended for red plum and rhubarb flans, whereas apricot glaze is recommended for yellow plum and apricot flans.

The German plum cake, known as Zwetschkenkuchen, can be found all over the country, although its home is Bavaria. In chef Robert Carrier's recipe the base is made from yeast pastry rather than often-used shortcrust pastry, because the yeast pastry "soaks up the juice from the plums without becoming soggy".

In Italy, plum cake is known by the English name, baked in an oven using dried fruit and often yoghurt.

The Polish version of plum cake, which also uses fresh fruit, is known as Placek z Sliwkami.

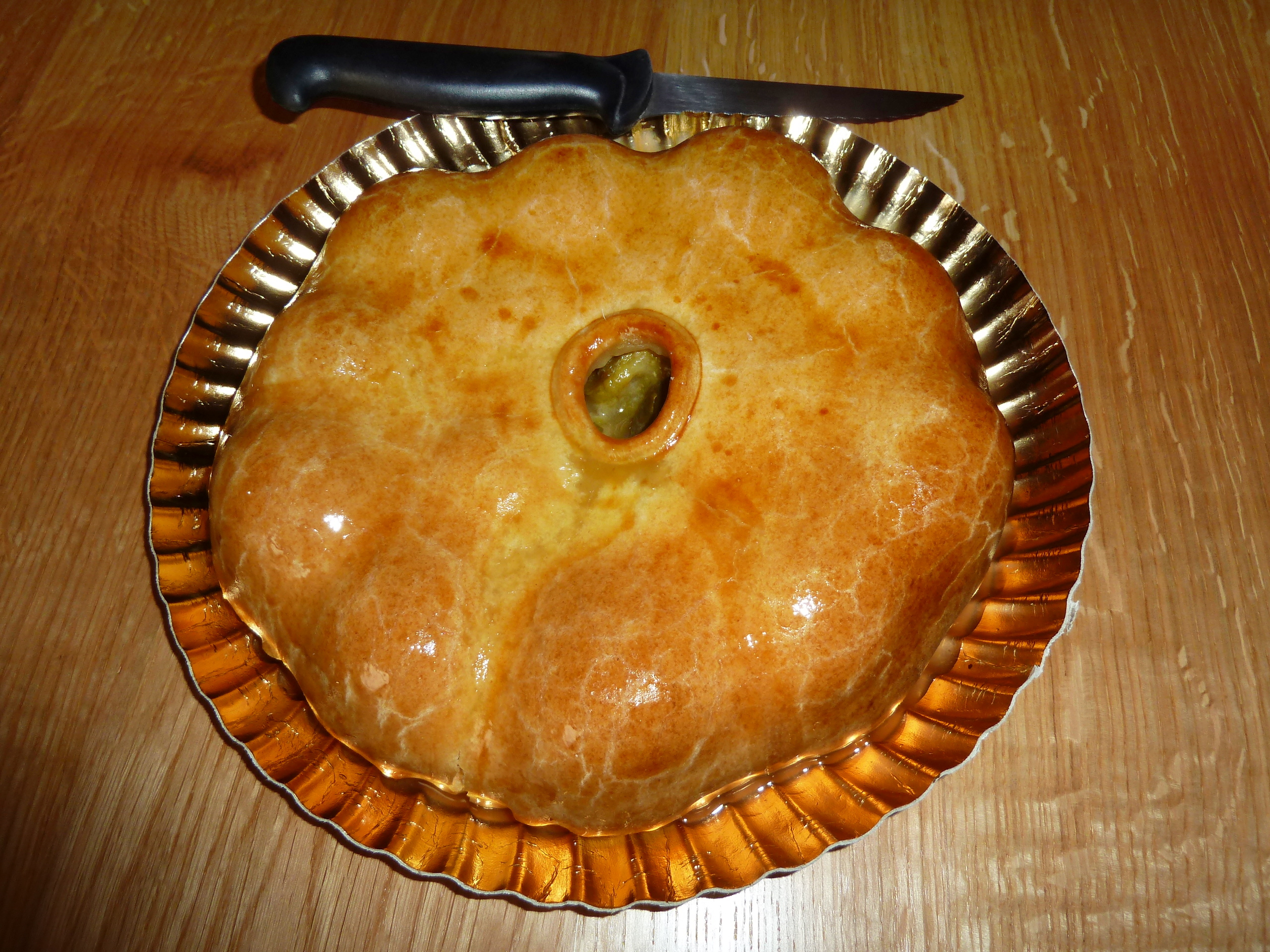
Pâté aux prunes (Plum tart), France

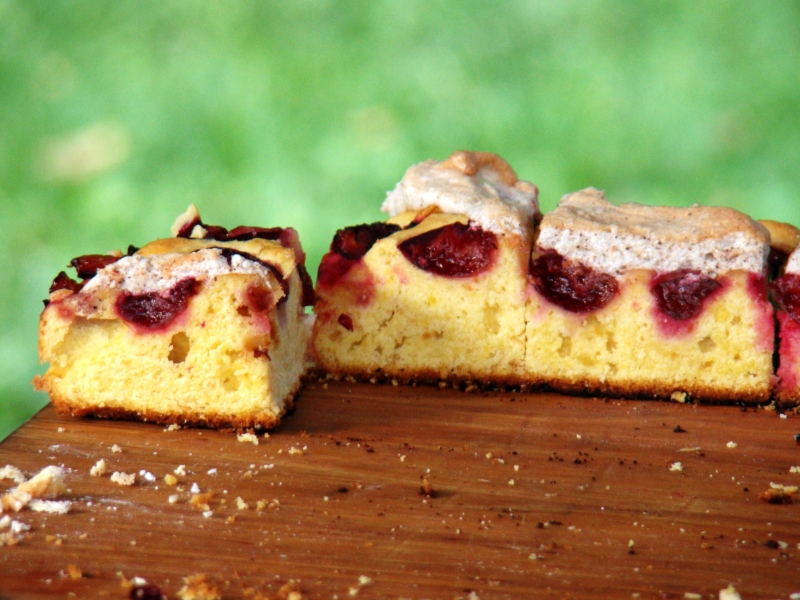
Sanok-style plum cake, Poland

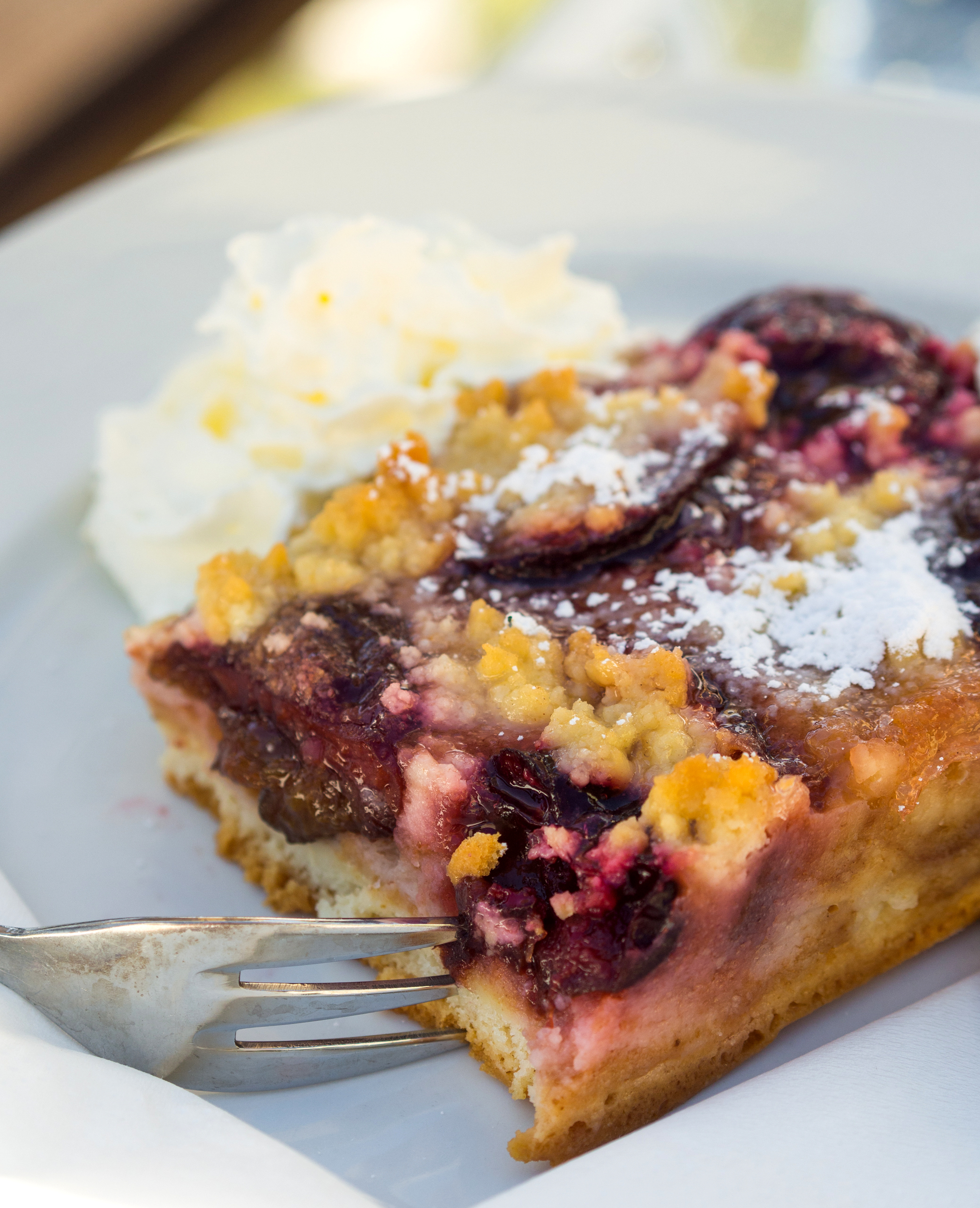
Zwetschkenkuchen, Tirol, Austria

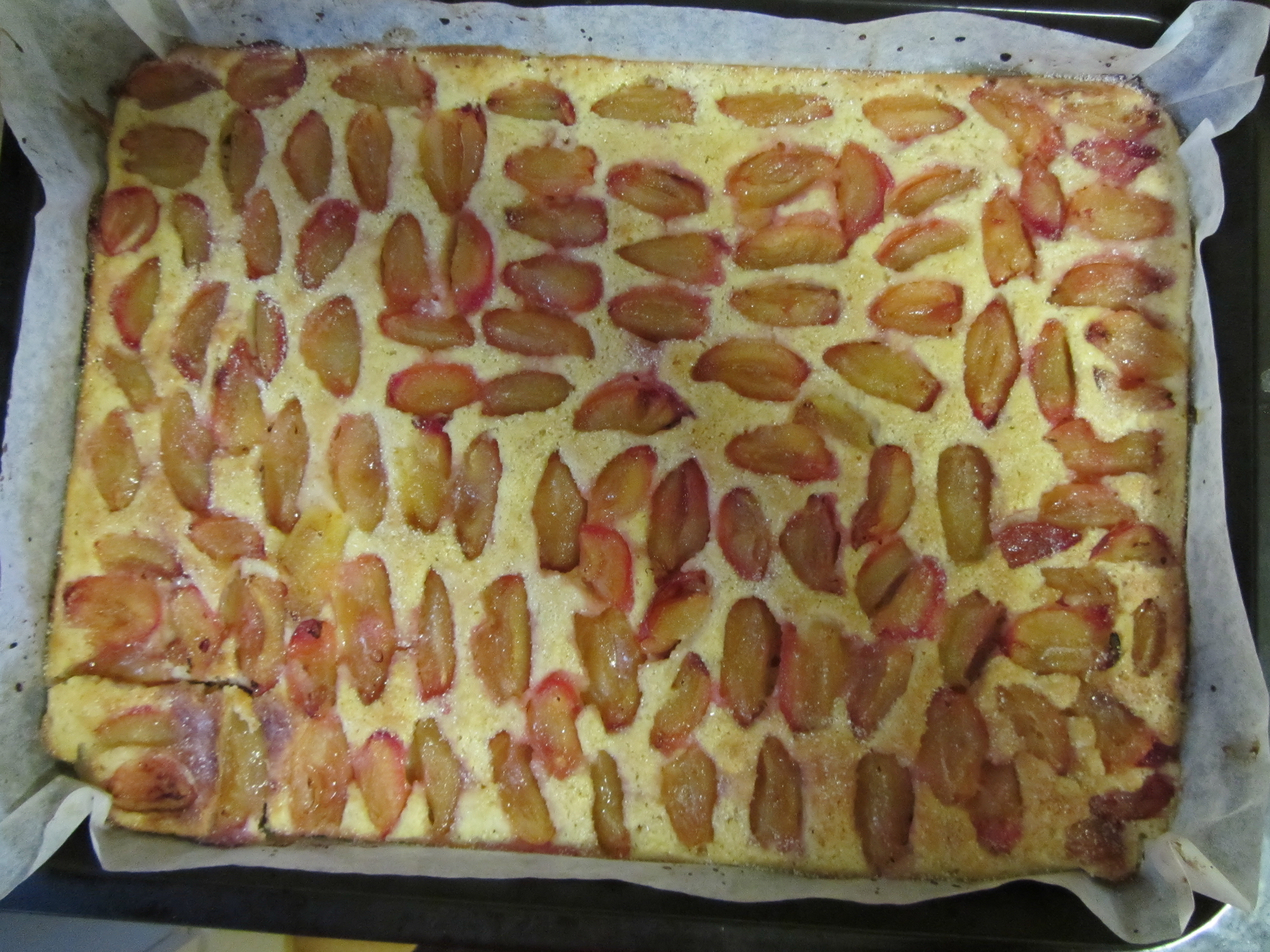
Plum cake just before it is baked

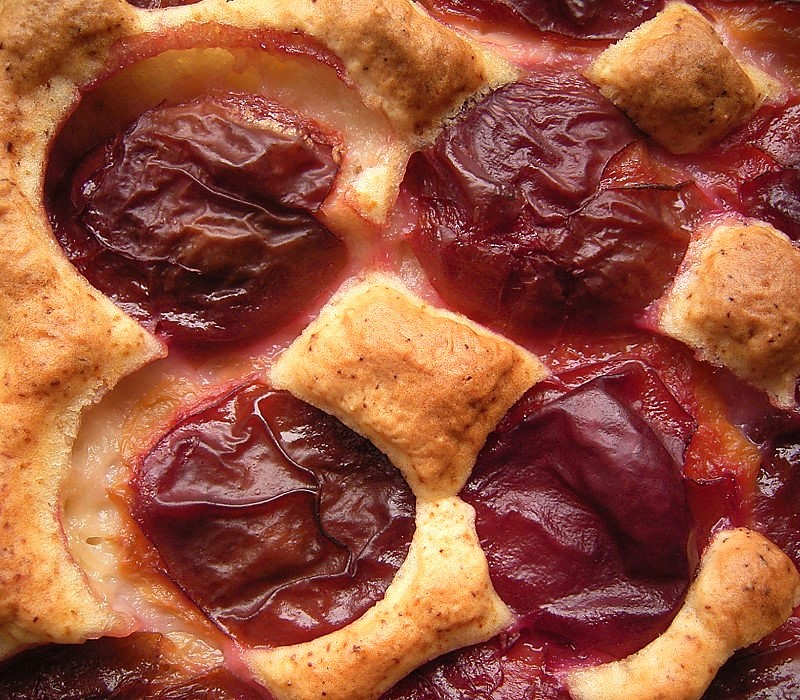
Cake topped with whole plums

=== India ===
In India, especially Kerala, plum cakes are eaten and gifted as a Christmas delicacy. Indian plum cakes often contain additional ingredients such as rum or other liquors, which are both mixed into the batter and used to soak the fruit. Records of Christmas plum cakes in Kerala exist as far back as the 17th century, when the plum cakes celebrated fruit and nut harvests in the winter season, but popularization of the cake is generally credited to the Royal Biscuit Factory of Thalassery, which was tasked with baking a Christmas cake for Scottish plantation owner Murdock Brown in 1883, who was so impressed by the final product he ordered several more.

=== United States ===
Plum cake in the United States originated with the English settlers and was prepared in the English style for parties in celebration of Twelfth Night, Christmas, and weddings, among others. This original fruitcake version of plum cake in the United States has been referred to as a reigning "standard American celebration cake through the time of the civil war".

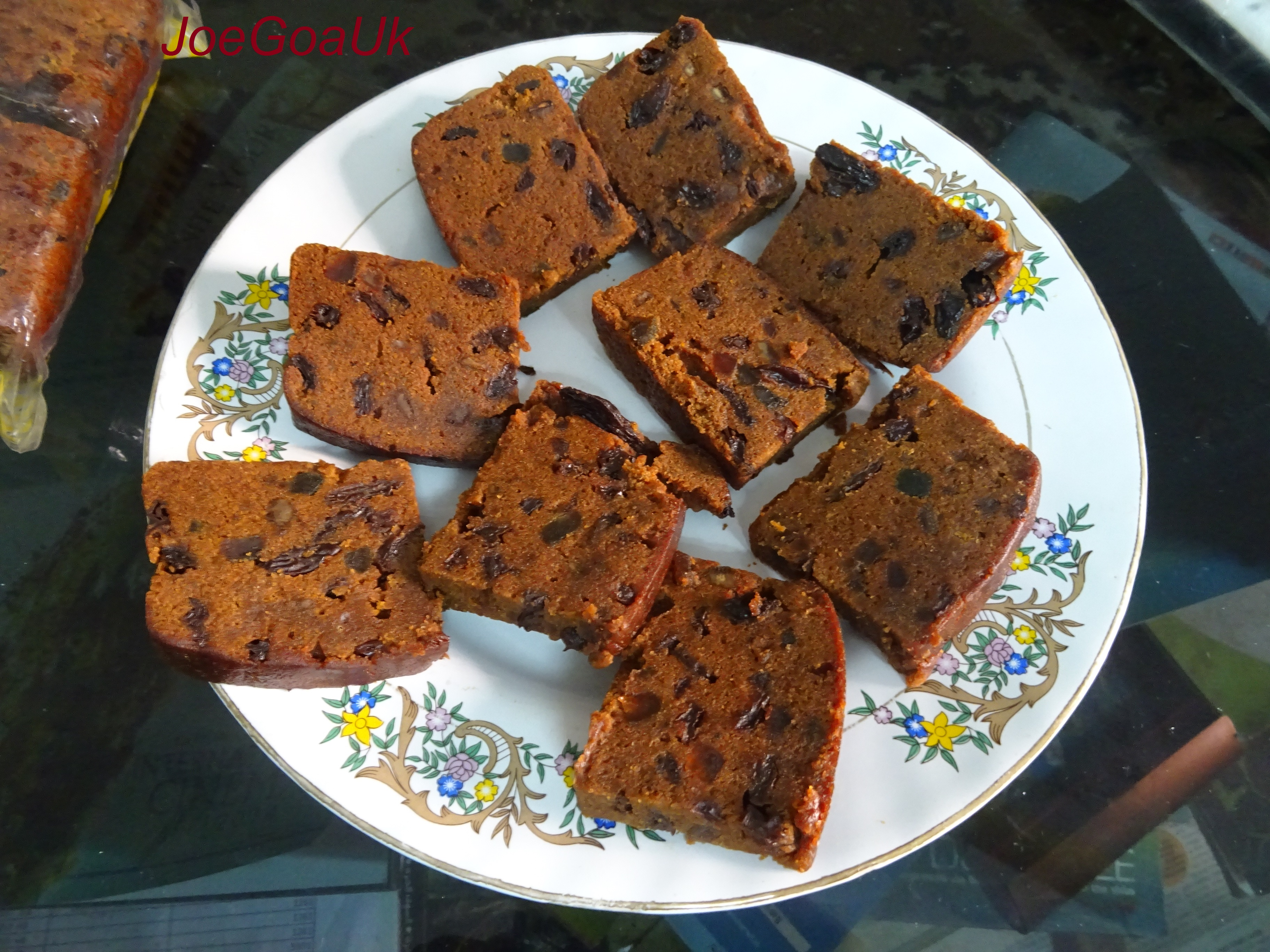
Old-fashioned plum cake might have been studded with raisins, currants, or other dried fruits instead of plums.

During colonial times before the American Revolution, "Muster" cakes were baked in great number for the men summoned by British troops for military training. Following the American Revolution women would bake these cakes in vast quantities to motivate the men to attend town meetings and elections. Thus it became known as "election cake". It was prepared with currants, raisins, molasses, and spices, with the addition of brandy in the recipe occurring later. Election cakes were typically leavened with yeast. In New England, large election cakes weighing around 12 pounds (5.4 kg) would traditionally be served while people waited for election results. It has been stated that the first published election cake recipe appeared in 1796 in American Cookery. In the first decades of the American republic, recipes for election cakes were published in newspapers alongside other patriotic dishes including "Federal Cake", "Independence Cake", "Ratification Cake", and the savory "Congressional Bean Soup".

Plum cake recipes in the fruitcake style appeared in early cookbooks in the Southern United States, and did not actually call for plums. After 1830 plum cake was often referred to as fruit cake or black cake. In 1885, in a description of plum cake that sounds like plum pudding, it was described as "mucilaginous" (gluey) – a solid, dark-colored, thick cake with copious amounts of plums, gritty notes from raisins.

== See also ==
- List of cakes
- Raisin cake
