= Fruitcake =

Cake made with candied or dried fruit, nuts, and spices

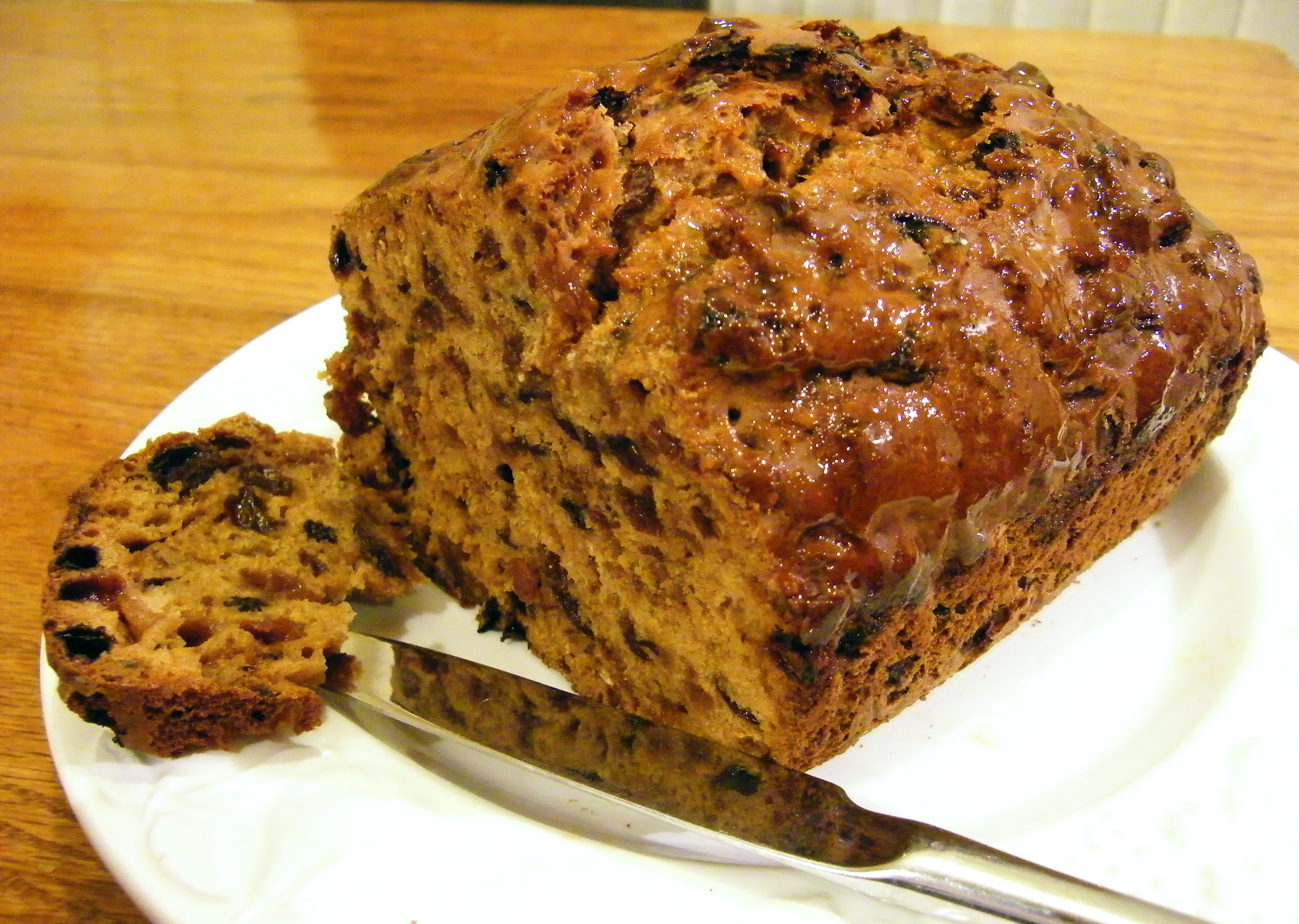
- Bara Brith, a traditional fruitcake loaf from Wales
- Type: Cake
- Place of origin: Europe
- Region or state: Various
- Created by: Originally from Roman times
- Main ingredients: Candied fruit and/or dried fruit, nuts, spices, sugars, flour
- Variations: Quickbread or yeasted. Can optionally be soaked in liquor. Many varied combinations of dried fruits and nuts possible. Sometimes topped with icing.

Fruitcake or fruit cake is a cake made with candied or dried fruit, nuts, and spices, and optionally soaked in spirits. In the United Kingdom, certain rich versions may be iced and decorated.

Fruitcakes are usually served in celebration of weddings and Christmas. Given their rich nature, fruitcakes are most often consumed on their own, as opposed to with condiments (such as butter or cream). Fruit cake is different to fruit bread, but may share similar toppings and mixtures.

== History ==
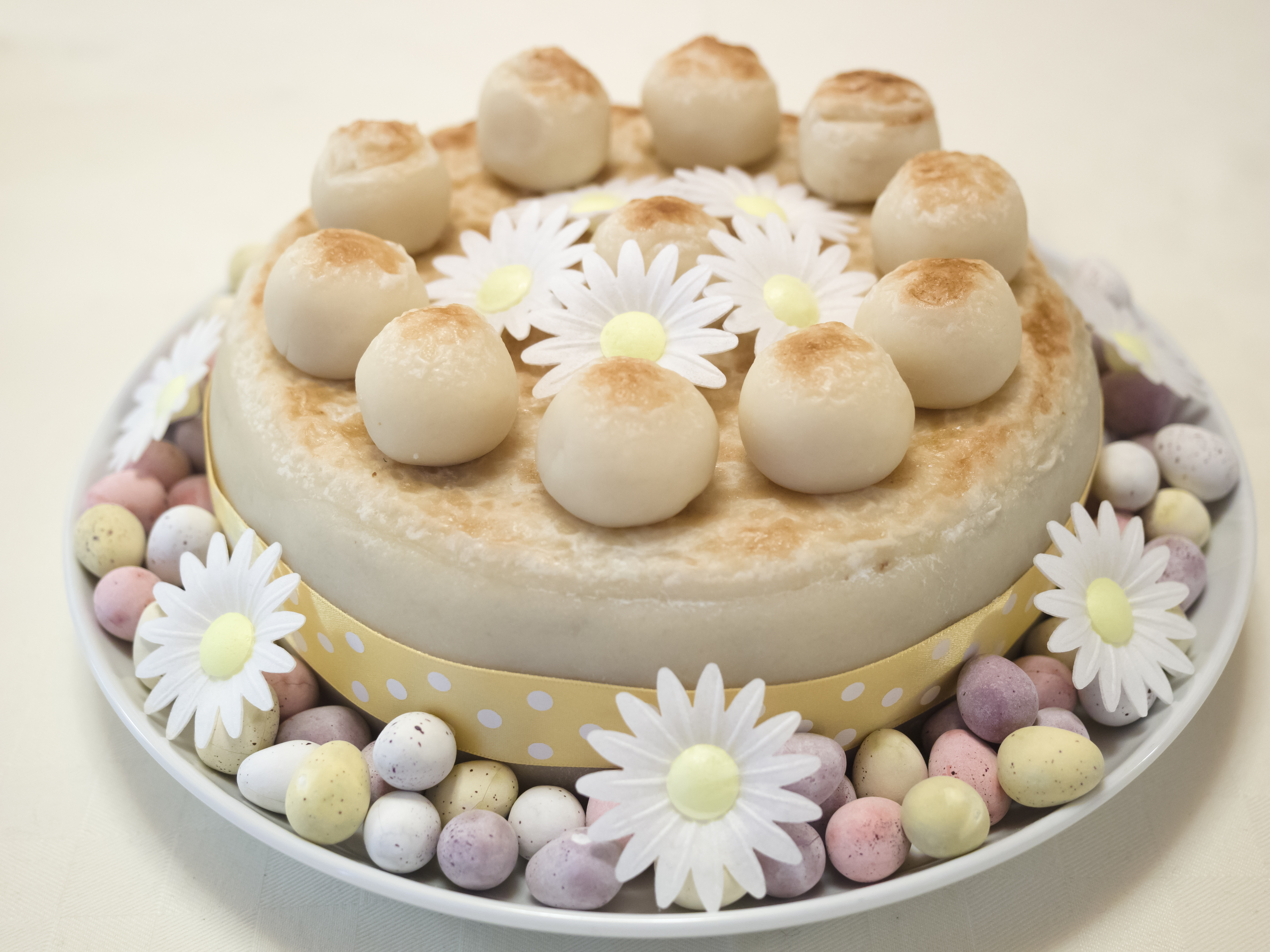
A traditional Easter Simnel cake

The earliest recipe from ancient Rome lists pomegranate seeds, pine nuts, and raisins that were mixed into barley mash. The name used by the Romans for this cake was satura. In the Middle Ages, honey, spices, and preserved fruits were added.

Fruitcakes soon proliferated all over Europe. Recipes varied greatly in different countries throughout the ages, depending on the available ingredients, as well as (in some instances) church regulations forbidding the use of butter, regarding the observance of Fasting. Pope Innocent VIII (1432–1492) finally granted the use of butter, in a written permission known as the ‘Butter Letter' or Butterbrief in 1490, giving permission to Saxony to use milk and butter in the Stollen fruitcakes.

Starting in the 16th century, sugar from the American Colonies (and the discovery that high concentrations of sugar could preserve fruits) created an excess of candied fruit, thus making fruitcakes more affordable and popular. The 17th-century English fruitcake was originally yeast-leavened, with the rum and dried fruit helping to extend the shelf life of the cake.

== In various countries ==
=== Australia ===
In Australia, fruitcake is consumed throughout the year, but most commonly at Christmas, and is available at most major retail outlets. The cake is rarely given icing; often it is consumed with butter or margarine, or custard.

=== Bahamas ===
In the Bahamas, not only is the fruitcake drenched with rum, but the ingredients are as well. All of the candied fruits, walnuts, and raisins are placed in an enclosed container and are soaked with the darkest variety of rum, anywhere from 2 weeks to 3 months in advance. The cake ingredients are mixed, and once the cake has finished baking, rum is poured onto it while it is still hot.

=== Bulgaria ===
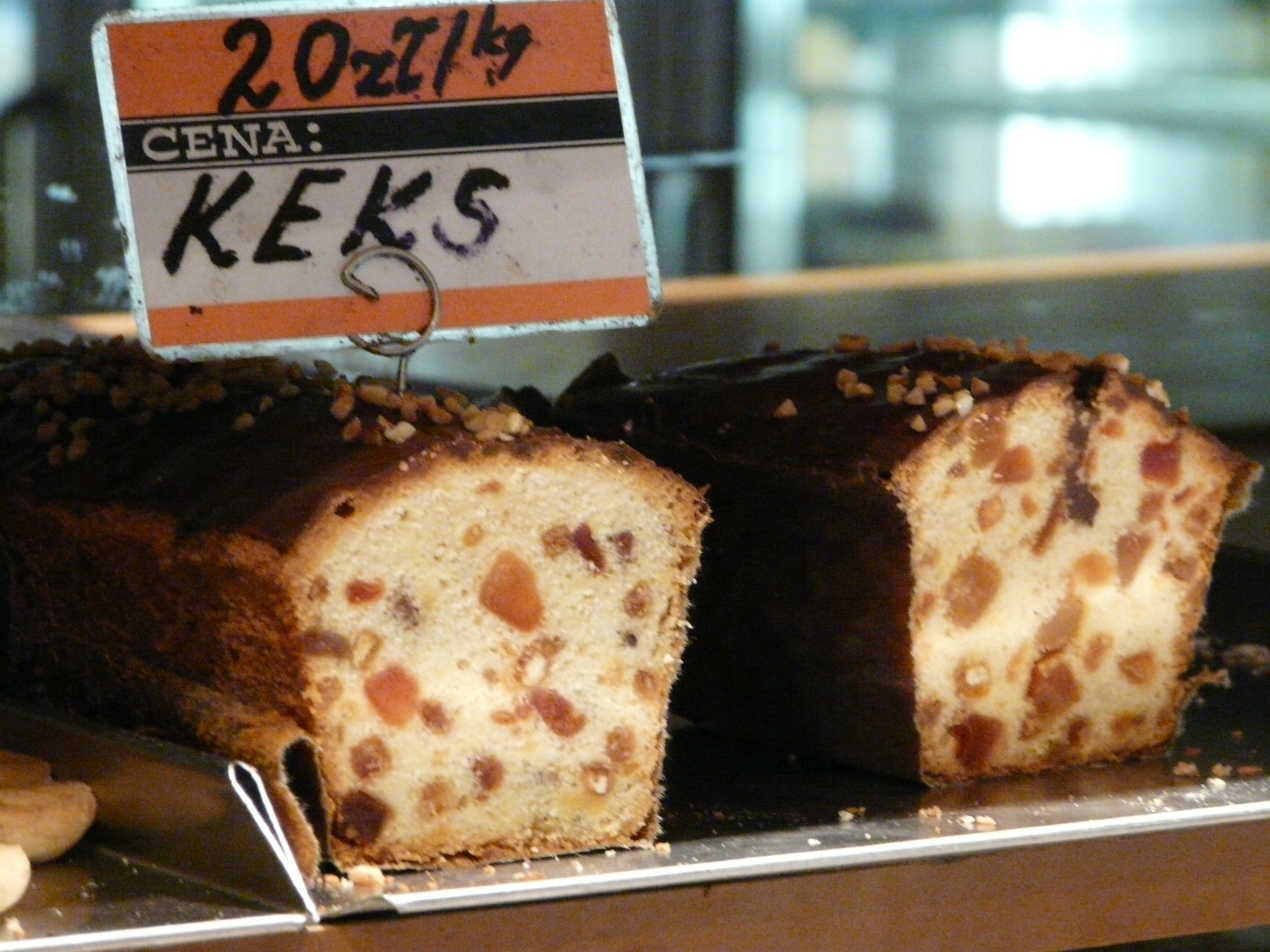
Keks sold in a shop

In Bulgaria, the common fruitcake is known as keks (Bulgarian: кекс [kɛks]), is home-made and is consumed throughout the year. Recipes for keks vary, but commonly it contains flour, butter and/or cooking oil, milk, yeast, yoghurt, eggs, cocoa, walnuts, and raisins. It is usually baked in Bundt-style pans.

There is also another specific type of fruitcake prepared for Easter, which is known as kozunak (Bulgarian: козунак [kozuˈnak]).

=== Canada ===
The fruitcake is commonly eaten during the Christmas season in Canada. Rarely is it seen during other times of the year. The Canadian fruitcake is similar in style to the UK version. However, there is rarely icing on the cake, and alcohol is not commonly put into Christmas cakes that are sold. The cakes are shaped like a small loaf of bread, and often covered in marzipan.

Dark, moist and rich Christmas fruitcakes are the most frequently consumed, with white Christmas fruitcake less common. These cakes tend to be made in mid-November to early December when the weather starts to cool down. They also can be a gift generally exchanged between business associates and close friends/family.

It is called gâteau aux fruits in Quebec and New-Brunswick.

=== Chile ===
Pan de Pascua is a fruitcake traditionally eaten around Christmas and Epiphany.

=== France ===
In France, fruitcake is called cake aux fruits confits.

=== Germany ===
In German, fruitcake means Früchtebrot, which is used both as a general and as specific name. In Germany, baked goods which fit the description of fruitcake are not usually regarded as cake but rather as sweet breads.

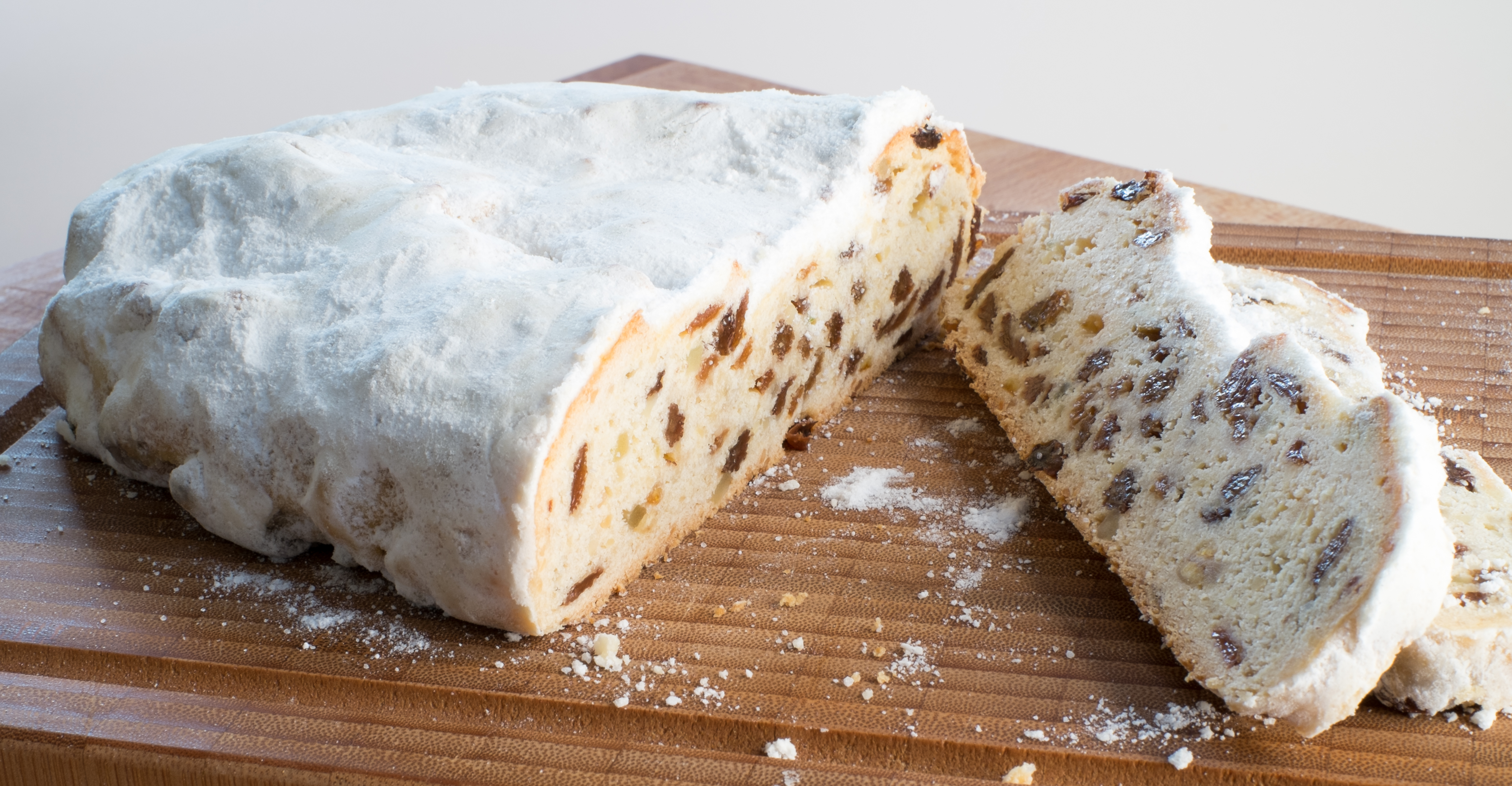
Dresdner Stollen

Stollen is loaf-shaped and often powdered with icing sugar on the outside. It is usually made with yeast, butter, water, and flour, with the addition of citrus zest, candied citrus peel, raisins, and almonds.

The most famous Stollen is the Dresdner Stollen, sold at the Dresden Christmas market, the Striezelmarkt. Official Dresden Stollen, produced by only 150 bakers in Dresden and some adjacent settlements, bears a special seal depicting Elector Augustus II the Strong. Typically, it is covered with a crust of compacted powdered sugar around 1 cm thick, but it is actually defined by its richness in butter and certain fruit and nuts: Per kilogram flour, Dresdner Stollen is mandated by law to contain at least 650 grams sultanas, 500 grams of butter, 200 grams succade, and 150 grams of almonds. The recipe originated in 1491, when after several generations of lobbying by Elector Ernest, Duke Albert III, and their ancestors, Pope Innocent VIII gave an exemption to the Roman Catholic ban on using butter during Lent to Saxon bakers.

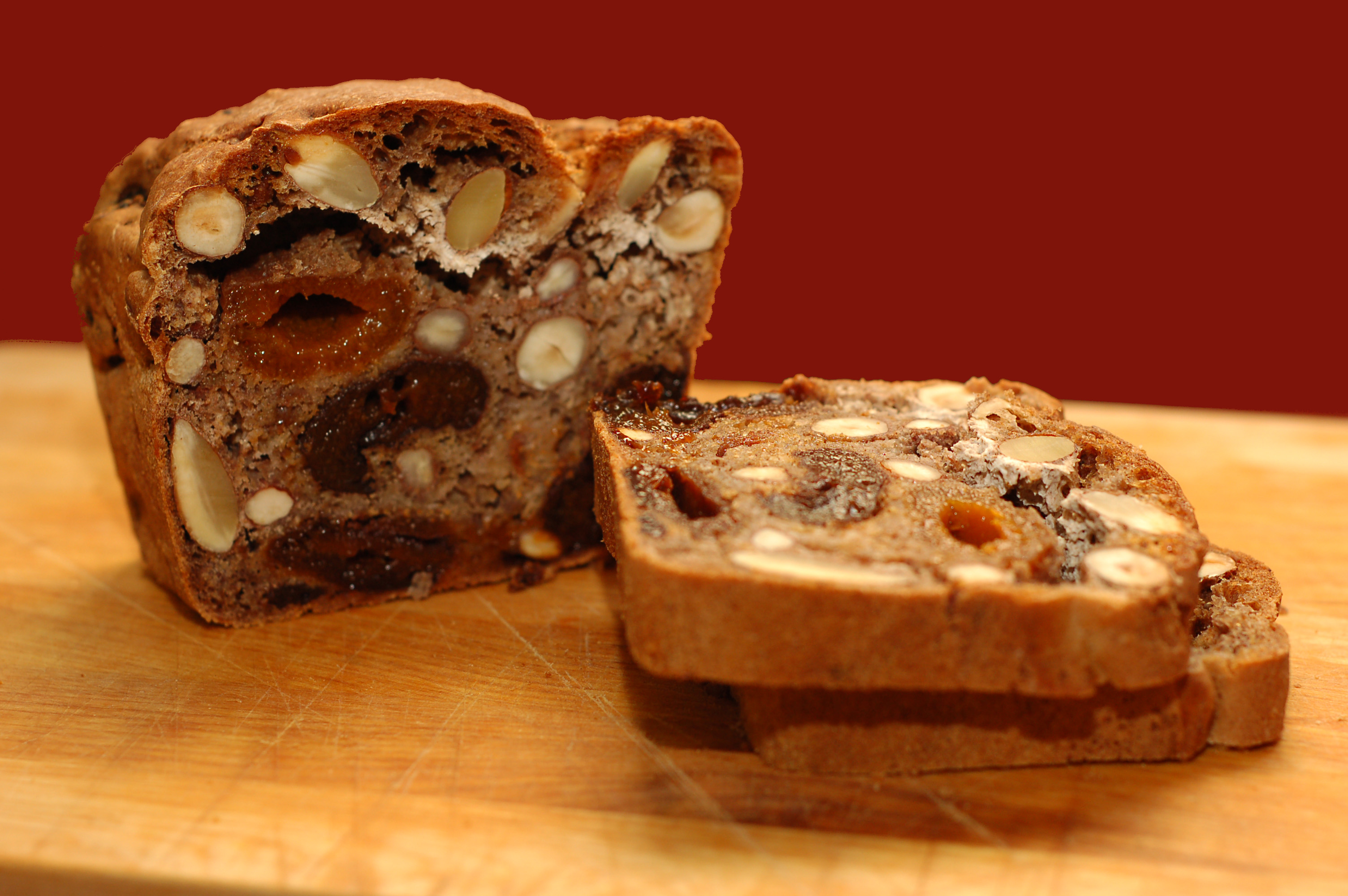
German Früchtebrot

In Bremen, the local fruitcake called Klaben is traditionally sold and eaten during the Christmas season. Bremer Klaben is a kind of stollen which is not dusted with powdered sugar after baking. Both Dresdner Stollen and Bremen Klaben are protected geographical indications.

In Southern Germany and the Alpine region, Früchtebrot (also called Berewecke, Birnenbrot, Hutzenbrot, Hutzelbrot, Kletzenbrot, Schnitzbrot, or Zelten) is a sweet, dark bread baked with nuts and dried fruit, e.g. apricots, figs, dates, plums, etc.

=== India ===
In India, fruitcake is found everywhere during the Christmas season, although it is also available commonly throughout the year.

=== Ireland ===
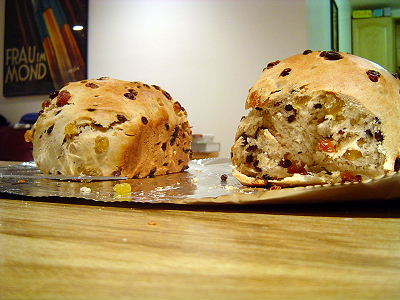
Irish barmbrack

In Ireland, a type of sweetbread called barmbrack is eaten at Halloween. The cake contains different objects such as a ring or small coin, each signifying a different fortune for the person who finds it.

=== Italy ===
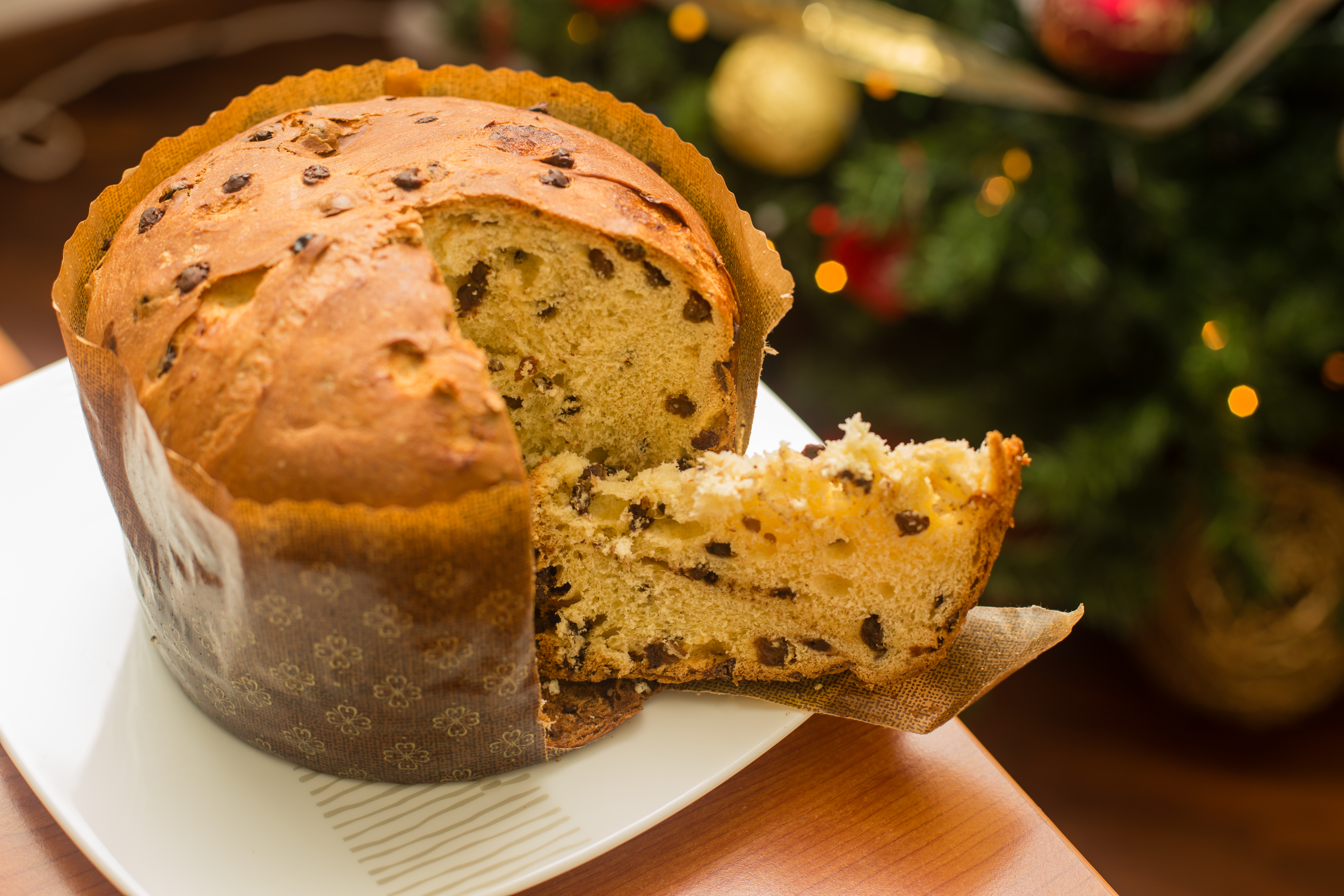
Italian panettone is a yeast-leavened fruitcake.

Panforte is a chewy, dense Tuscan fruitcake dating back to 13th-century Siena. Panforte is strongly flavored with spices (panforte means "strong bread") and baked in a shallow form. Genoa's fruitcake, a lower, denser but still crumbly variety, is called pandolce ("sweet bread").

There are various types of fruitcakes from the Emilia-Romagna region, most being dark and heavily spiced with an abundance of candied fruit and nuts. The certosino from Bologna is a round cake similar to panforte but with aromatic spices and a variety of whole-halved candied fruit decorating the top; dark chocolate is often added to the dough for a richer flavour. The certosino is low and very dense. Panone, produced in much of Emilia, is similar to the certosino, but with a lighter, fluffier dough and candied fruit inside the cake rather than used as decoration. Panpepato from Ferrara has a dough similar to panone but has a higher ginger content. Candied fruit is not often found and instead there is a high concentration of nuts within the dough; the entire cake is often coated in dark chocolate.

Gubana is a Christmas/holiday cake from the Friuli-Venezia Giulia region, specifically from the area around Cividale del Friuli. It is a leavened dough cake with a filling of nuts, dried fruit, sugar, and grappa which is rolled into a spiral filled tube which is then twisted into the shape of a rose or snail's shell. Gubana is often eaten with alcohol (slivovitz or grappa) around the holiday season. It combines Italian, Friulan, and Slovenian tastes and cooking styles to create a unique sweet.

Panettone is a Milanese sweet bread (widely available throughout Italy and in many other countries), served around Christmas, which is traditionally filled with dried and candied fruits, with a bread-like consistency.

=== New Zealand ===
Fruitcakes arrived in New Zealand with early settlers from Britain. Until the 1960s fruitcake was generally homemade, but since then has become commercially widely available in a range of styles. Light coloured fruitcake is often sold as tennis cake or light fruit-cake all year round.

Most New Zealand wedding cakes are finely iced and decorated fruitcake often several tiers high. Most fruitcake is eaten in the Christmas period. It is dark, rich and made from multiple dried fruits. Homemade cakes may use brandy or sherry to enhance flavour rather than as a preservative. They may be square or round, iced or uniced. A Christmas cake is usually simply decorated with a Christmas scene or the words Merry Christmas.

=== Poland ===
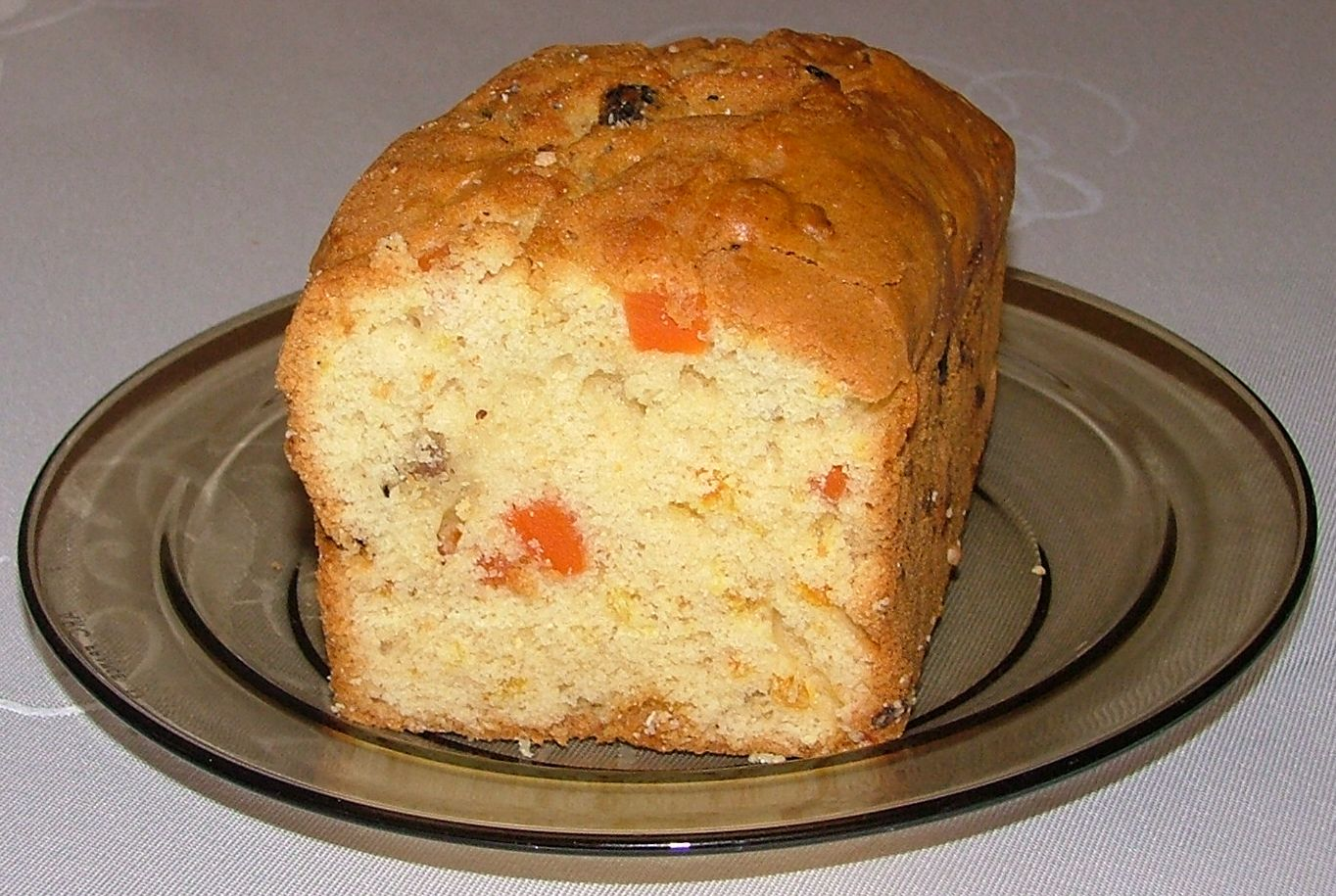
Polish keks

Keks is a traditional fruitcake eaten during Christmas season. It is a loaf shaped sponge cake with a substantial content of nuts, raisins, figs and candied fruits.

=== Portugal ===
Although French in its origin, Bolo Rei is a traditional fruitcake enjoyed during Christmas season and a staple dessert in any Portuguese home during the holidays. Included is the characteristic fava bean and, according to tradition, whoever finds the fava bean has to pay for the cake the following year.

=== Switzerland ===
Birnenbrot is a dense sweet Swiss fruitcake with candied fruits and nuts.

=== Anglophone Caribbean ===
Black cake, is a traditional part of Christmas celebration in the English Caribbean. The cake incorporates a large quantity of mixed fruits and rum/wine and becomes a treasured Christmas treat consumed and given out between the Christmas season and New Year. The fruit, wine and rum is prepared weeks, sometimes months, ahead, and has its origin in the English Christmas pudding, and can be quite expensive. It is very different from a North American fruitcake.

=== United Kingdom ===
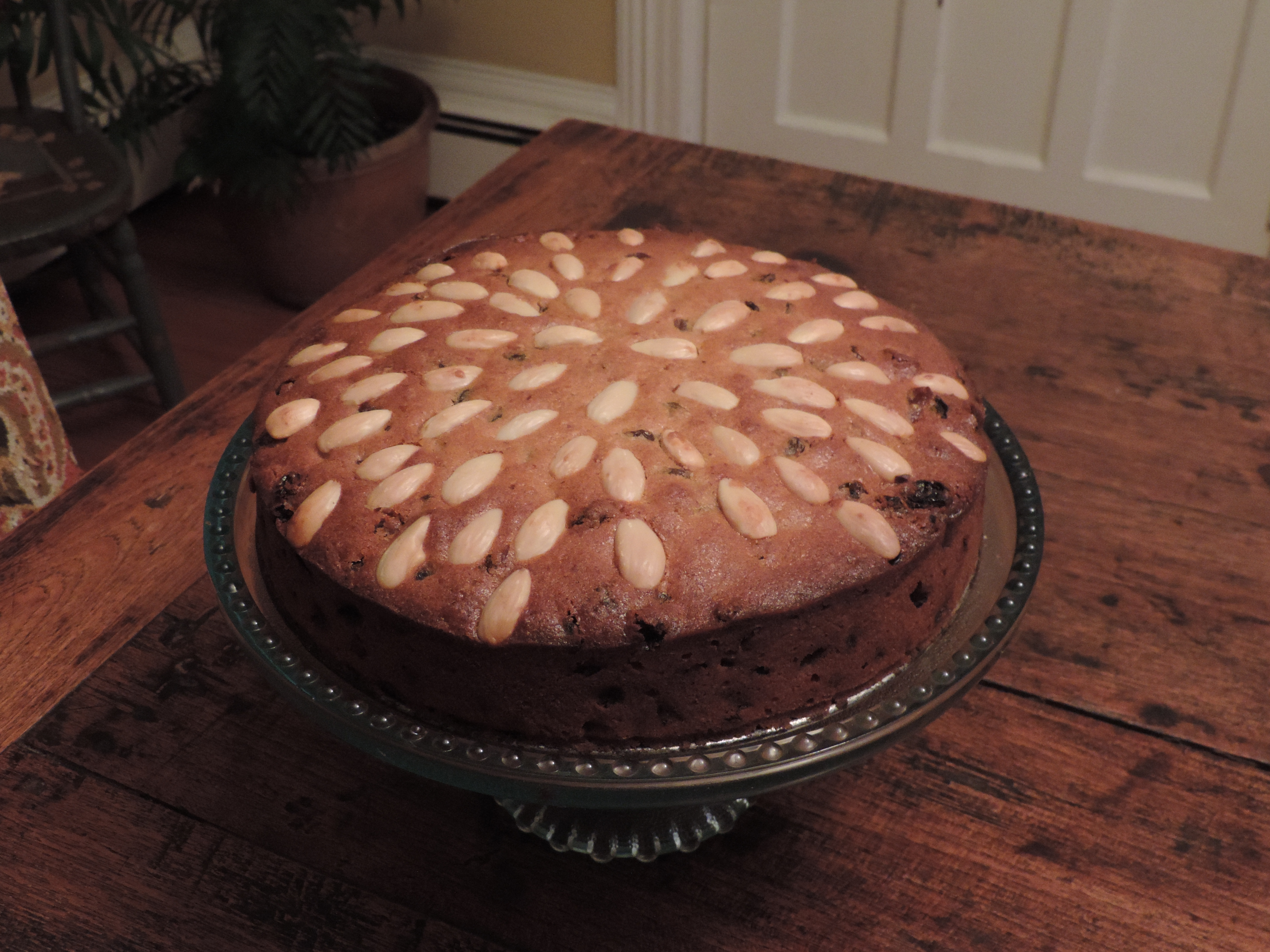
Dundee cake

In the UK, fruitcakes are made in types ranging from extremely light to rich and moist.

The traditional Christmas cake is a round fruitcake covered in marzipan and then in white royal icing or fondant icing. It is often further decorated with snow scenes, holly leaves and berries (real or artificial), or tiny decorative robins or snowmen. It is also the tradition for a similar kind of cake to be served at weddings.

In Yorkshire, fruitcake is often served accompanied with cheese. Fruitcakes in the United Kingdom often contain currants and glace cherries, an example of this type being the Genoa cake. A type of fruitcake which originated in Scotland, the Dundee Cake, owes its name to Keiller's marmalade. It does not contain glace cherries, but is decorated with almonds.

In Wales, bara brith is a type of fruitcake flavoured with tea, dried fruits and spices.

Fruitcake was historically referred to as plum cake in England from around 1700.

=== United States ===
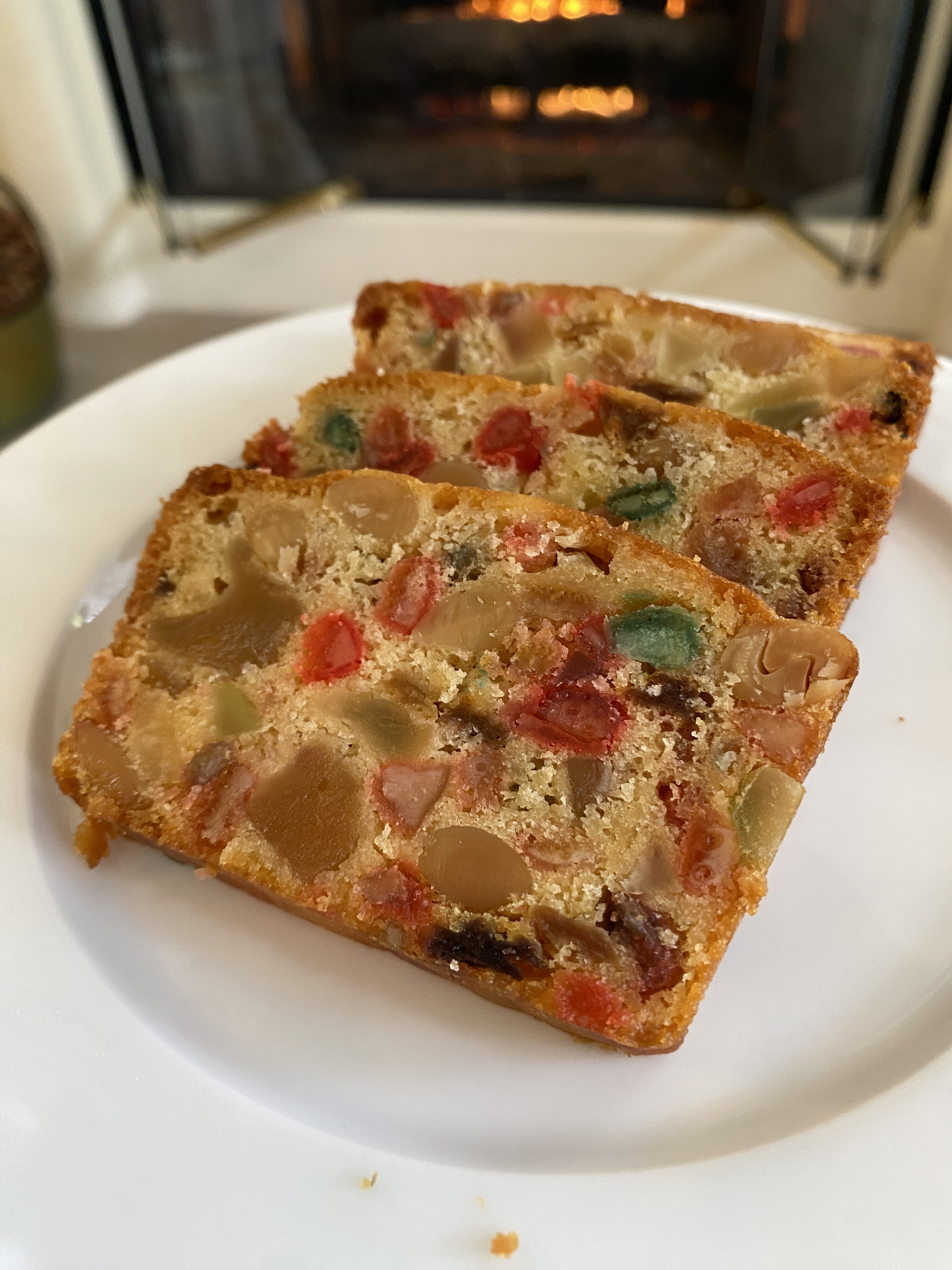
Two-year-aged brandy-soaked fruitcake

Typical American fruitcakes are rich in fruit and nuts.

Mail-order fruitcakes in America began in 1913. Some well-known American bakers of fruitcake include Collin Street Bakery in Corsicana, Texas, and The Claxton Bakery in Claxton, Georgia. Both Collin Street and Claxton are Southern companies with inexpensive access to large quantities of nuts, for which the expression "nutty as a fruitcake" was derived in 1935. Commercial fruitcakes are often sold from catalogues by charities as a fund raiser.

Fruitcakes are also made and sold by Christian monasteries, as a means of supporting the monks and nuns who reside there. Some well-known American monasteries which offer fruitcake include Abbey of Gethsemani, in Trappist, Kentucky; Assumption Abbey in Ava, Missouri; Monastery of the Holy Spirit, in Conyers, Georgia; and Trappist Abbey in Carlton, Oregon. The fruitcake produced by the Trappists of the Abbey of Gethsemani in Trappist, Kentucky earned the "best overall fruitcake" accolade from The Wall Street Journal. During an interview on Russell Howard's Good News, astronaut Chris Hadfield recounted that a fruitcake made by "Trappist monks in the Ozarks" was found and served aboard the International Space Station during Hadfield's tenure as commander.

Most American mass-produced fruitcakes are alcohol-free, but those made according to traditional recipes are saturated with liqueurs or brandy and covered in powdered sugar, both of which prevent mould. Brandy (or wine) soaked linens can be used to store the fruitcakes, and some people feel that fruitcakes improve with age.

In the United States, fruitcake has become a ridiculed dessert, in part due to inexpensive mass-produced cakes of questionable age. Some attribute the beginning of this trend to The Tonight Show host Johnny Carson. He would joke that there is really only one fruitcake in the world, passed from family to family. After Carson's death, the tradition continued with "The Fruitcake Lady" (Marie Rudisill), who made appearances on the show and offered her "fruitcake" opinions. In fact, the fruitcake had been a butt of jokes on television programs such as Father Knows Best and The Donna Reed Show years before The Tonight Show debuted. It appears to have first become a vilified confection in the early 20th century, as evidenced by Warner Bros. cartoons. It has also been used as a derogatory term for people who are considered weak, strange, or insane.

Since 1995, Manitou Springs, Colorado, has hosted the Great Fruitcake Toss on the first Saturday of every January. Leslie Lewis of the Manitou Springs Chamber of Commerce said that they encourage the use of recycled fruitcakes. The all-time Great Fruitcake Toss record is 1,420 feet, set in January 2007 by a group of eight Boeing engineers who built the "Omega 380", a mock artillery piece fueled by compressed air pumped by an exercise bike.

== Shelf life ==
When a fruitcake contains a good deal of alcohol, it can be preserved for many years. For example, a fruitcake baked in 1878 has been kept as an heirloom by a family in Tecumseh, Michigan; as of 2019, the baker's great-great-granddaughter is the custodian of the cake. Wrapping the cake in alcohol-soaked linen before storing is one method of lengthening its shelf life.

A 106-year-old fruitcake discovered in 2017 by the Antarctic Heritage Trust was described as in "excellent condition" and "almost" edible.

== See also ==
- List of cakes
- List of fruit dishes
- List of sweet breads
- Bara brith
- Christmas cake
- Christmas pudding
- Clementine cake
- Crema de fruta
- Fig cake
- Kulich (bread)
- Panettone
- Plum cake
- Stollen
