= Fig cake =

Dish

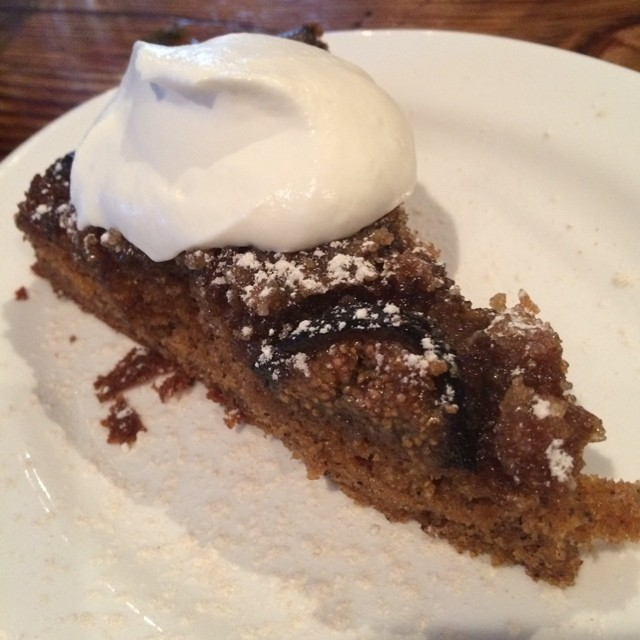
- Skillet fig cake topped with whipped cream
- Type: Cake
- Course: Dessert
- Serving temperature: Cold or warmed
- Main ingredients: Fig fruit and cake batter
- Similar dishes: Fruitcake

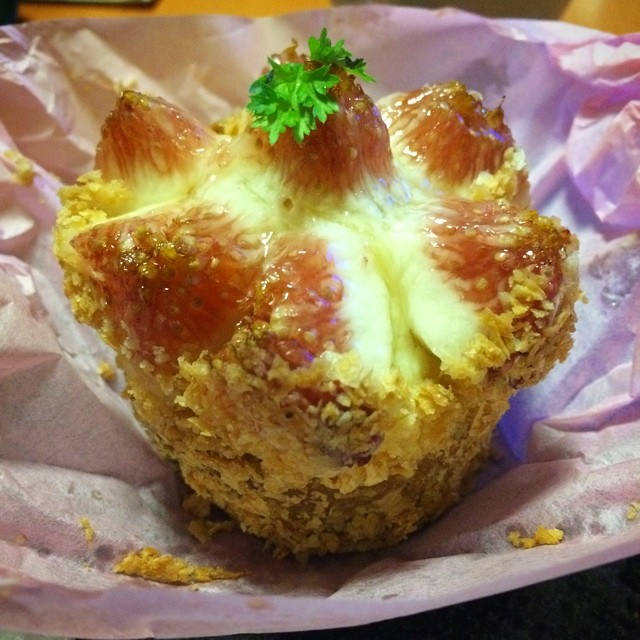
A fig cupcake

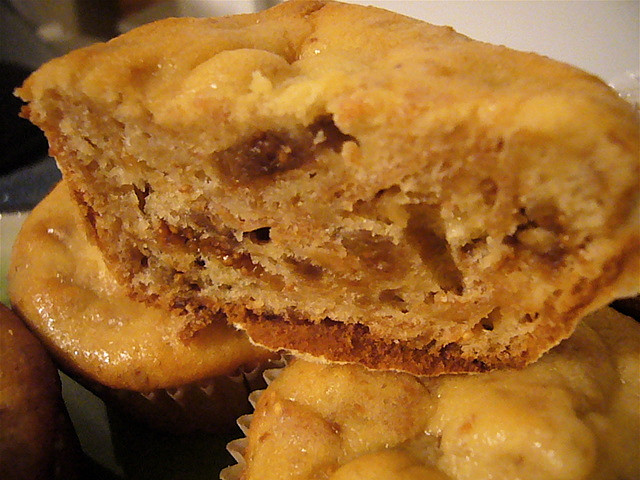
A fig cupcake

Fig cake (Greek: sikopita) is a cake prepared with fig as a primary ingredient. Some preparation variations exist. It is a part of the cuisine of the Southern United States, Greek cuisine, and the Appalachian Mountains region of North America. It is also a part of the cuisine of Ocracoke, North Carolina, which has an annual fig festival.

== Overview ==
Fig cake is prepared with fig as a main ingredient. Additional ingredients include typical cake ingredients, along with unique ingredients such as pecans, walnuts, pistachios, almonds, cinnamon, nutmeg, allspice and cloves. Fig cake may be a moist cake, and may be topped with a fig-based sauce, honey, whipped cream or a glaze. A buttermilk glaze is used atop some fig cakes. Figs may be used to garnish the cake. Fig cake may be prepared as a pudding cake, a bundt cake, a layer cake and as a torte cake. It can be prepared as a gluten-free dish. Fig cake may be baked in a skillet. Fig tarts may be prepared using fig as a primary ingredient.

== In cuisines ==
Fig cake is a part of the cuisine of the Southern United States and a part of Greek cuisine, in which it is referred to as sikopita. Fig preserves is sometimes used in the preparation of fig cakes and sikopita.

== By region ==
=== Appalachians ===
Fig cake and similar cakes have traditionally been served in the Appalachian Mountains of the eastern United States as a part of Old Christmas celebrations. In this region, Old Christmas is celebrated through January 6 each year. January 6th is the date of the arrival of the biblical Wise Men in Bethlehem. Fig cake, along with similar cakes such as jam cake, prune cake and applesauce cake, are common in this region during the Christmas and holiday season.

=== Ocracoke ===
In Ocracoke, North Carolina, figs and fig cake are a prominent part of the town's cuisine, and the town has an annual fig festival that includes a fig cake contest. In Ocracoke, the cake was first prepared by Margaret Garrish sometime in the 1950s or 1960s, and the recipe was picked up by others in the town. Fig cake is served at several restaurants in Ocracoke.

== See also ==
- Fig roll
- Fruitcake
- List of cakes
