= Zelten =

Traditional Italian fruitcake

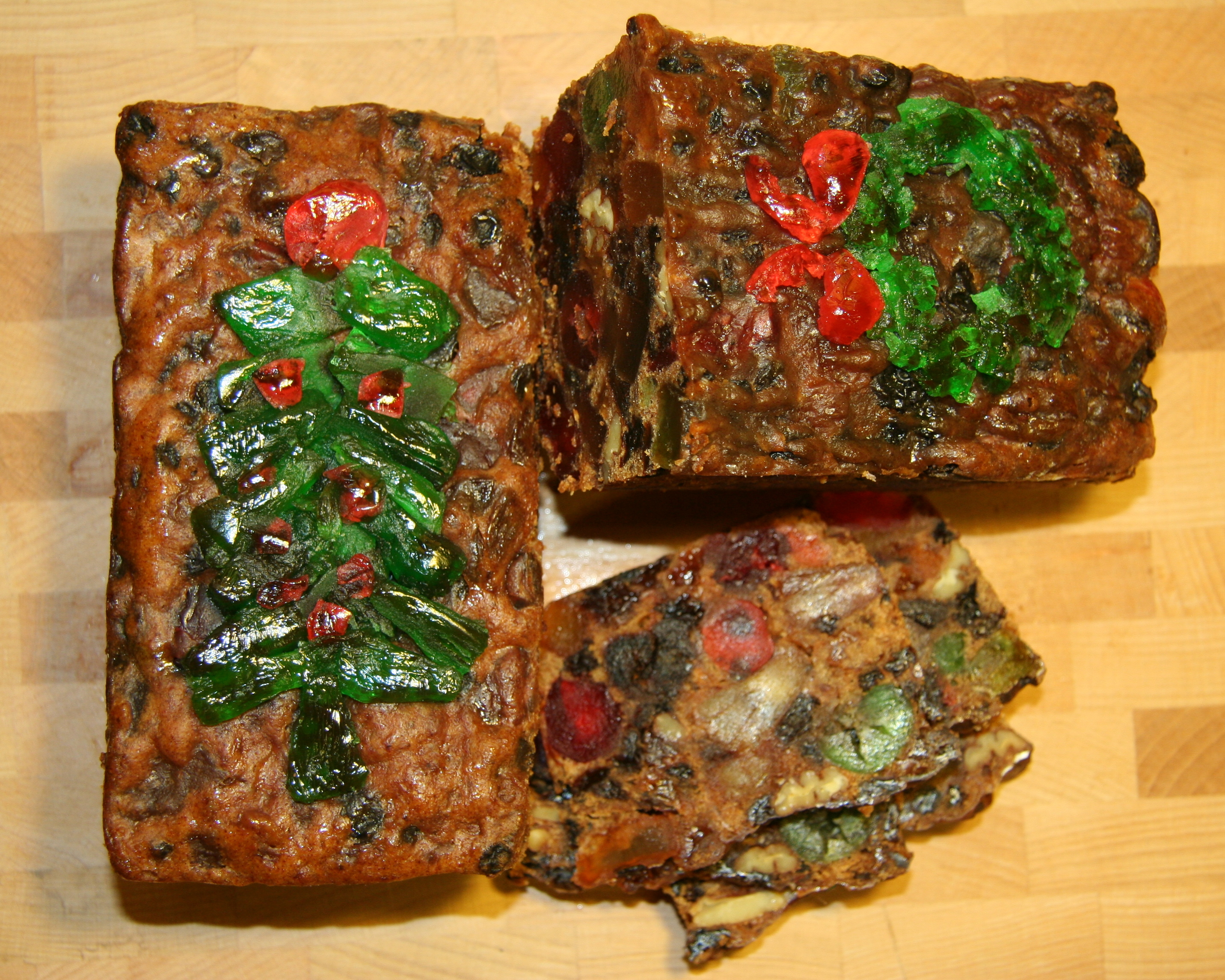
- Sliced zelten
- Alternative names: Früchtebrot
- Course: Dessert
- Region or state: Italy
- Main ingredients: Rye flour, sugar, dried fruit

for town and unrelated oilfield in Libya, see Zaltan/Zelten and Zelten oil field.

Zelten is a sort of Früchtebrot (fruitcake) originating in the South Tyrol (Trentino-Alto Adige/Südtirol) region of the Alps, prepared usually only during Christmas time. It is made with rye flour, wheat flour, dried and candied fruits, orange zest, and various spices.

The name probably derives from the German word selten, which translates to 'seldom', since it is usually prepared only once a year.

The related Italian regional kind of fruitcakes are Panforte, Panone, Panettone.

== Gallery ==
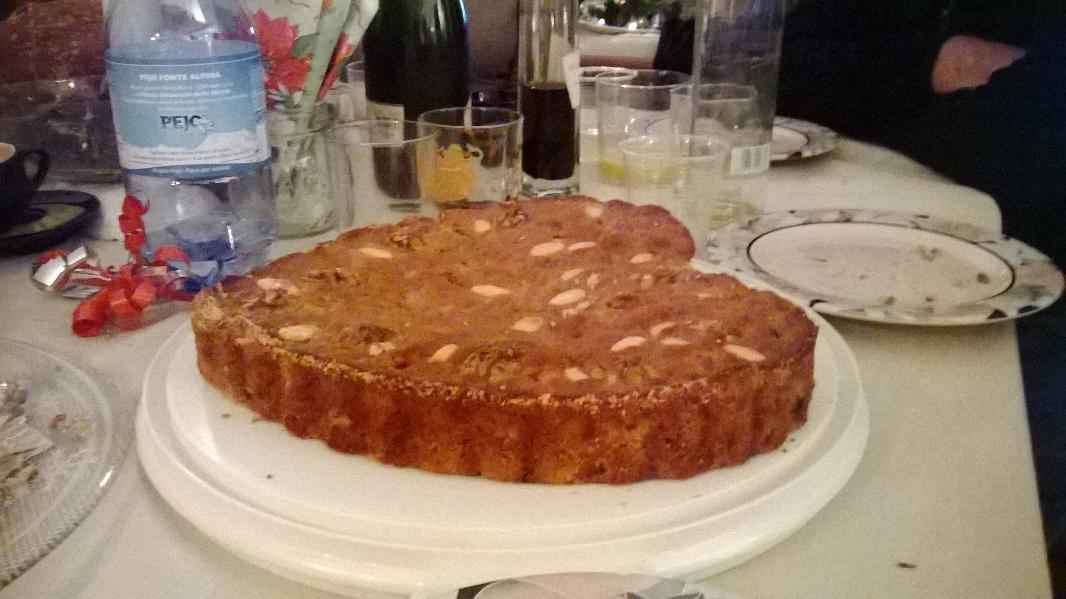
Heart-shaped zelten

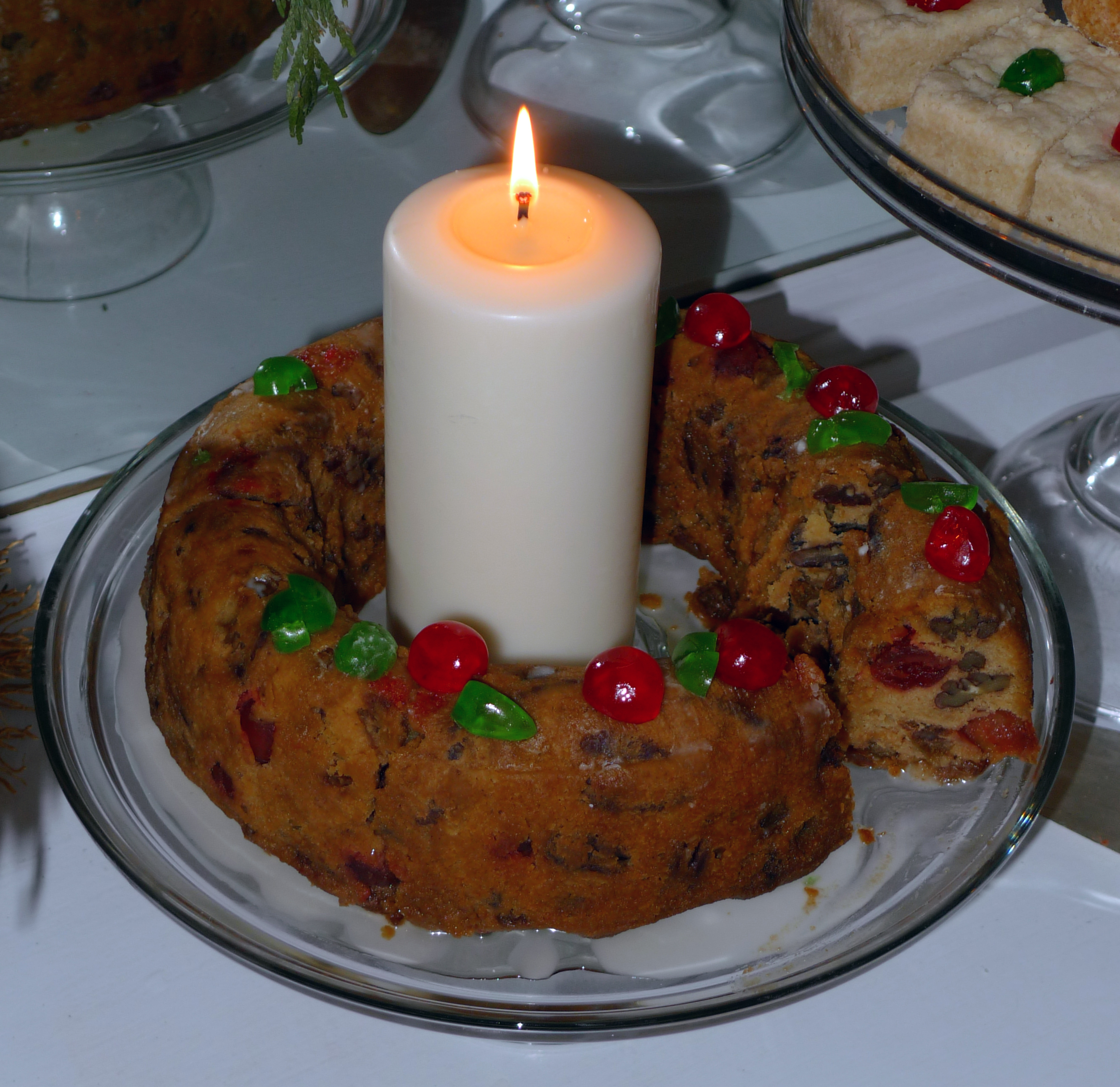
Zelten with candle

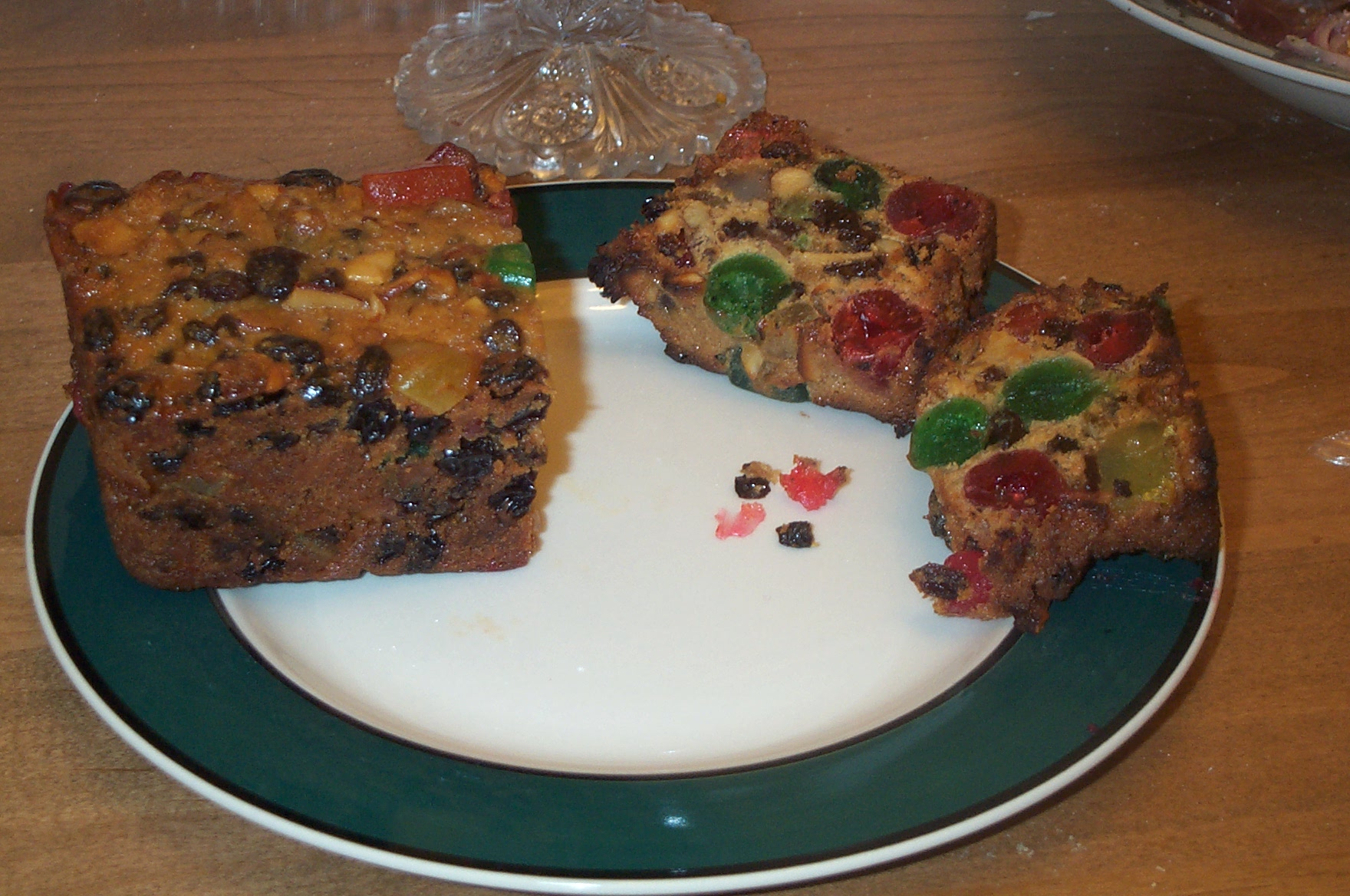
Sliced zelten
