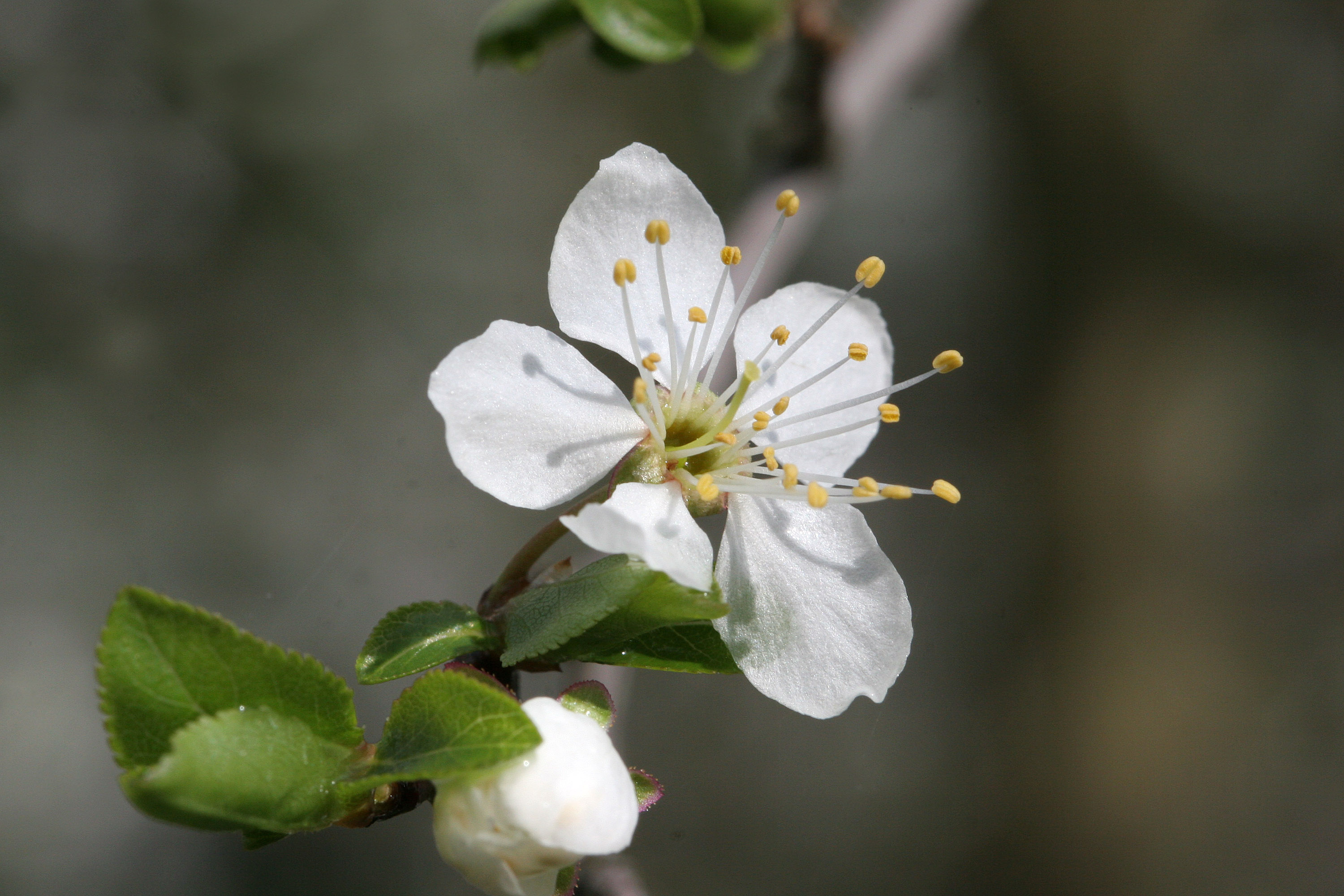
- Blossom of Mirabelle plum in detail

Scientific classification
- Kingdom: Plantae
- Clade: Embryophytes
- Clade: Tracheophytes
- Clade: Angiosperms
- Clade: Eudicots
- Clade: Rosids
- Order: Rosales
- Family: Rosaceae
- Genus: Prunus
- Section: Prunus sect. Prunus
- Species: P. domestica
- Subspecies: P. d. subsp. syriaca

Trinomial name
- Prunus domestica subsp. syriaca (Borkh.) Janch. ex Mansf.

= Mirabelle plum =

Subspecies of plum

Mirabelle plum (Prunus domestica subsp. syriaca) is a cultivar group of plum trees of the genus Prunus. It is believed that the plum was cultivated from a wild fruit grown in Anatolia.

== Description ==
The mirabelle is identified by its small, oval shape, smooth-textured flesh, and especially by its red, or dark yellow colour which becomes flecked in appearance. They are known for being sweet and full of flavour. The fruit is primarily used in fruit preserves and dessert pies, and its juice is commonly fermented into wine or distilled into plum brandy. Mirabelle plums are widely used for jam production and for distillation into eau-de-vie.

The mirabelle reaches maturity and is harvested from July to mid-September in the Northern Hemisphere. The traditional method of shaking the trees is now mechanized, but the principle remains the same: the ripe fruits are shaken loose and collected in a net under the tree.

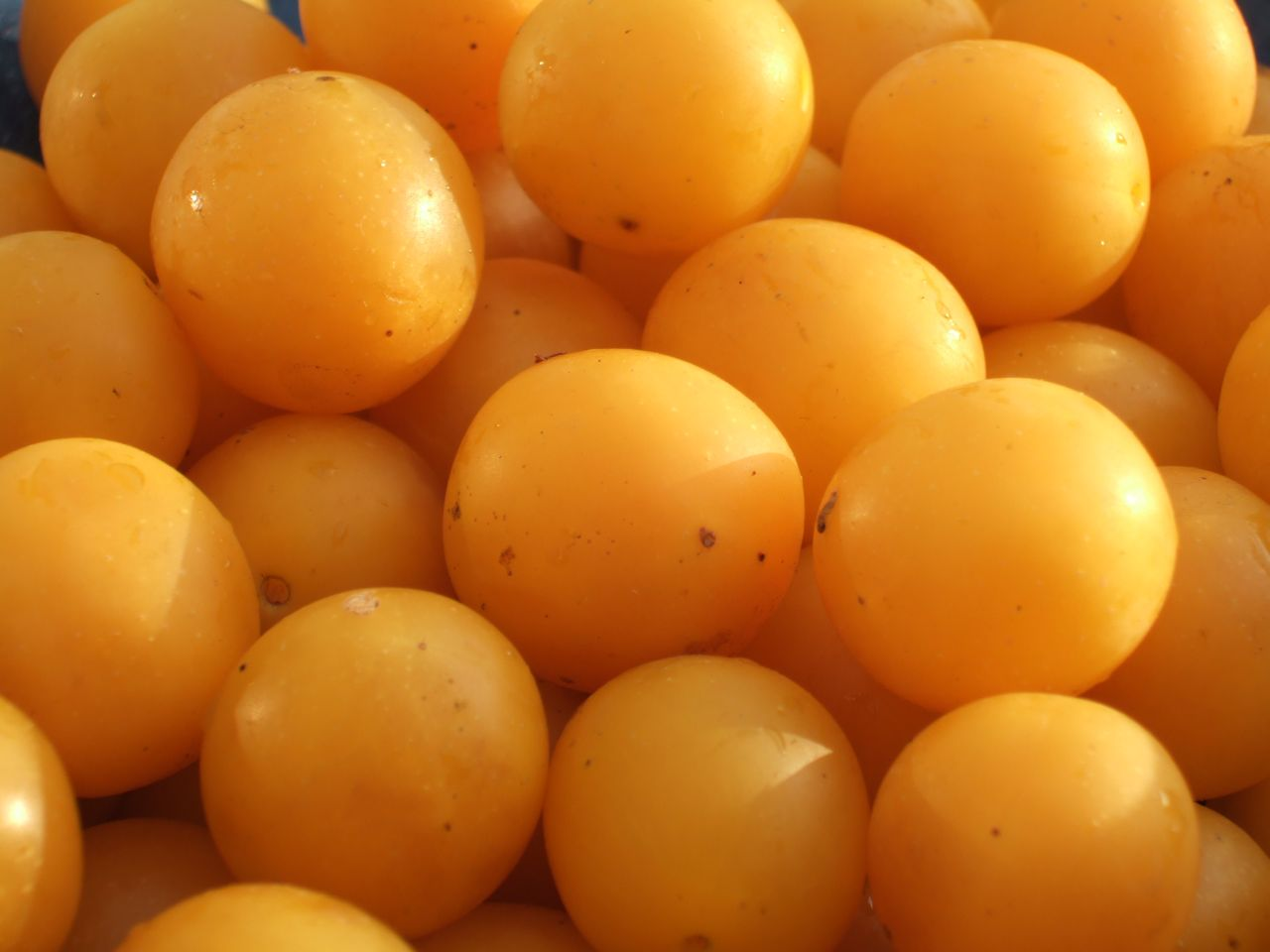
Mirabelle plums

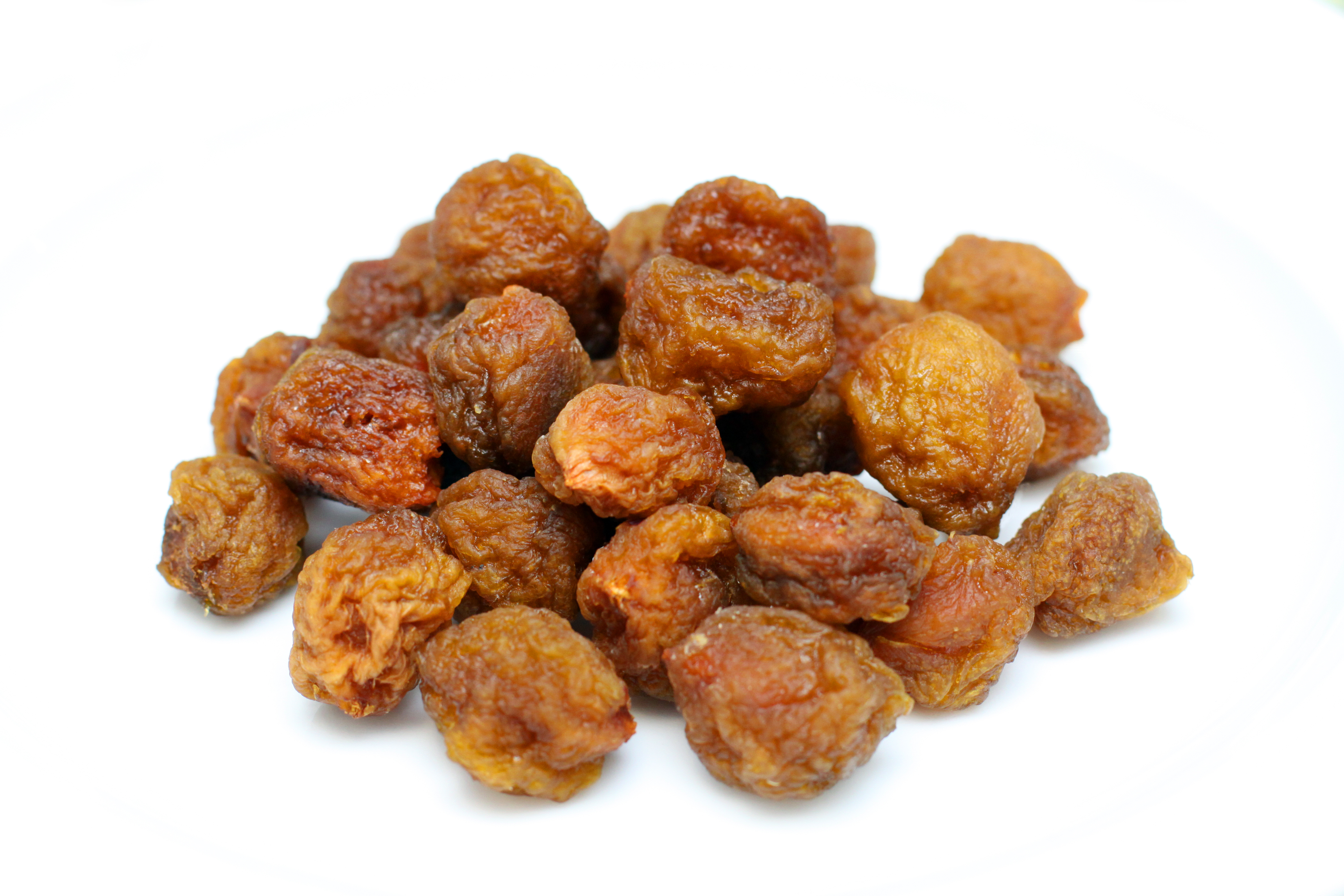
Dried Mirabelle plums

== Cultivars ==
The following cultivars are considered part of the Mirabelle cultivar group:

- Mirabelle de Nancy
- Mirabelle de Metz

== Mirabelle de Lorraine ==
The mirabelle is a speciality of the French region of Lorraine, which has an ideal climate and soil composition for the cultivation of this fruit. This region produces 15,000 tons of mirabelle plums annually, which constitutes 80% of global commercial production.

There are two main cultivars grown for fruit production, derived from cherry plums grown in Nancy and Metz. The Metz type is smaller, less hard, and less sweet, and has no small red spots on the skin. It is very good for jam, while the Nancy type is better as fresh fruit as it is sweeter.

Since 1996 the mirabelle de Lorraine has been recognized and promoted by the EU as a high-quality regional product, with a Protected Geographical Indication (PGI). This label guarantees a minimum fruit size (22 mm) and sugar content, and can only be used in a specific geographical zone of production.

The city of Metz dedicates two weeks to the Mirabelle plum during the popular Mirabelle Festival held in August. During the festival, in addition to open markets selling fresh prunes, mirabelle tarts, and mirabelle liquor, there is live music, fireworks, parties, art exhibits, a parade with floral floats and competition, and the crowning of the Mirabelle Queen and a gala of celebration.

== See also ==
- Tarte aux mirabelles
