= Tarte aux mirabelles =

Sweet fruit tart

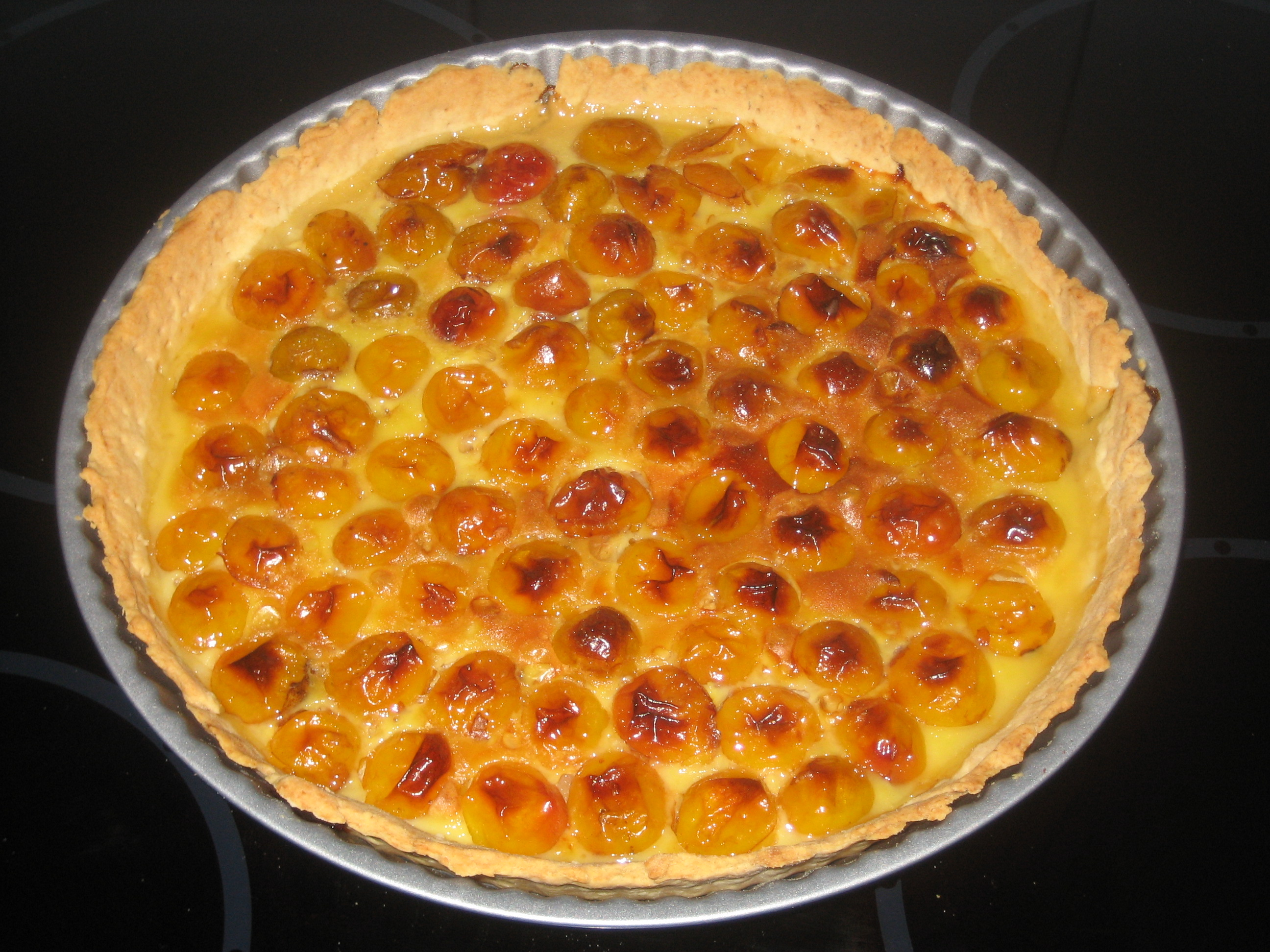
- Type: Tart
- Course: Dessert
- Place of origin: France
- Serving temperature: Hot or cool
- Main ingredients: Mirabelle plums; pastry

Tarte aux mirabelles is a sweet French tart, combining pastry and mirabelle plums (stones removed). It is a speciality of Lorraine in north-east France, where the mirabelle is an important crop. It also features in the cuisine of other regions of the country.

== Background ==
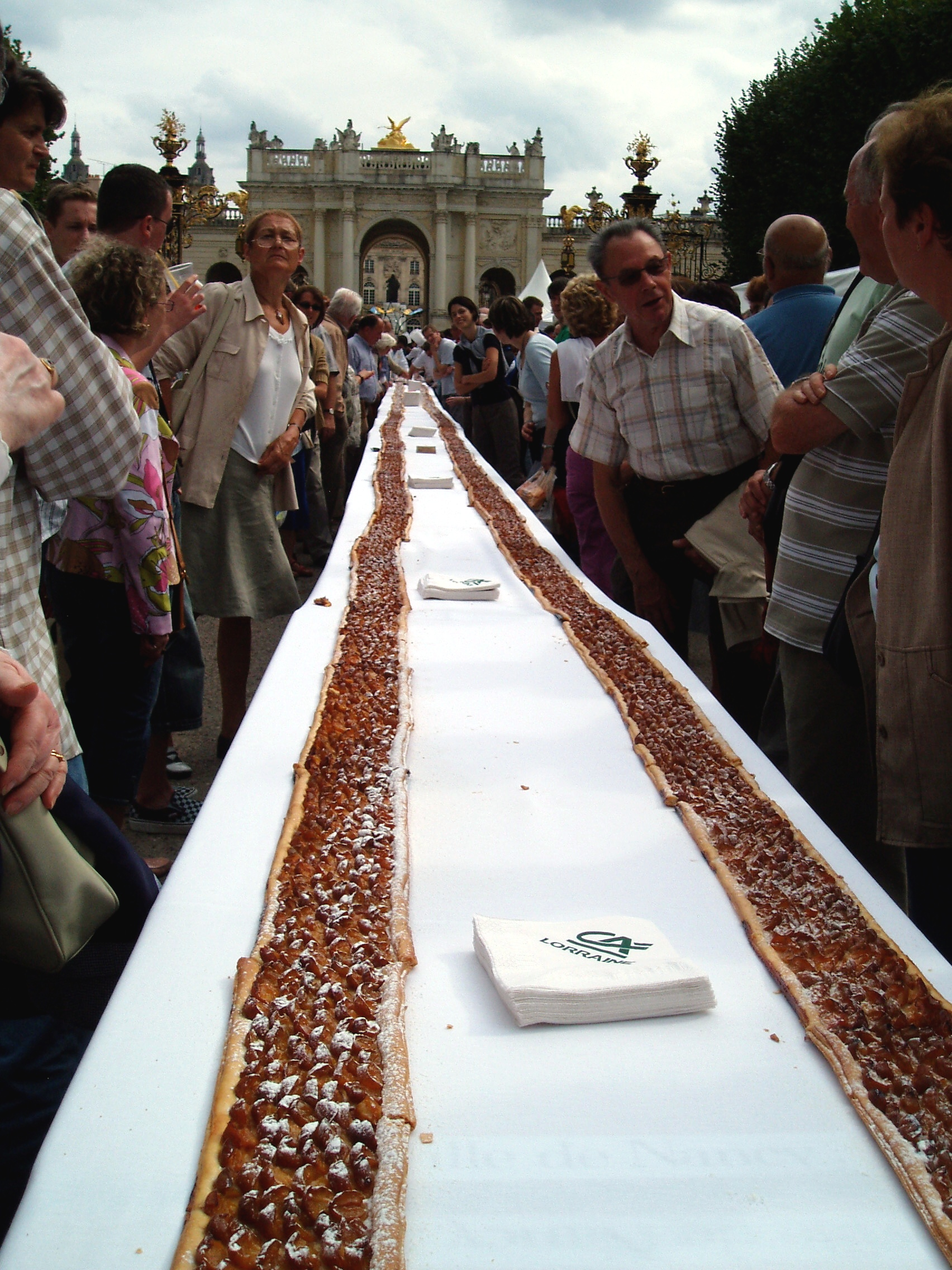
Longest-ever tarte aux mirabelles (206.31 m (677 ft), or 4,000 portions), Nancy, France, 2006

The mirabelle plum has been cultivated since at least the 17th century. The Dictionnaire de l'Académie française and the Oxford English Dictionary both give the probable derivation of the name as Mirabel, a fairly frequent toponym in the south of France. A tart made with mirabelles is traditional in Lorraine and its neighbour Alsace and is found in other parts of France.

== Pastry ==
The type of pastry used for tarte aux mirabelles varies. The most frequently mentioned in recipes is pâte brisée, but other sweet pastries – pâte sablée and pâte sucrée – are specified by some cooks, and unsweetened shortcrust and puff are also used in some recipes. In Beaulieu-sur-Dordogne, Elizabeth David encountered a tarte aux mirabelles made with yeast pastry: "Those little round golden plums of early autumn on their light brioche-like base made an unexpected and memorable end to our outdoor feast".

== Composition ==
The traditional tarte aux mirabelles consisted solely of fruit, pastry and a little sugar sprinkled on top before cooking. Some more recent recipes, including that of Albert and Michel Roux, have introduced a layer of crème pâtissière spread on the pastry base before the layer of fruit is added.
