= Früchtebrot =

Sweet bread baked with dried fruit

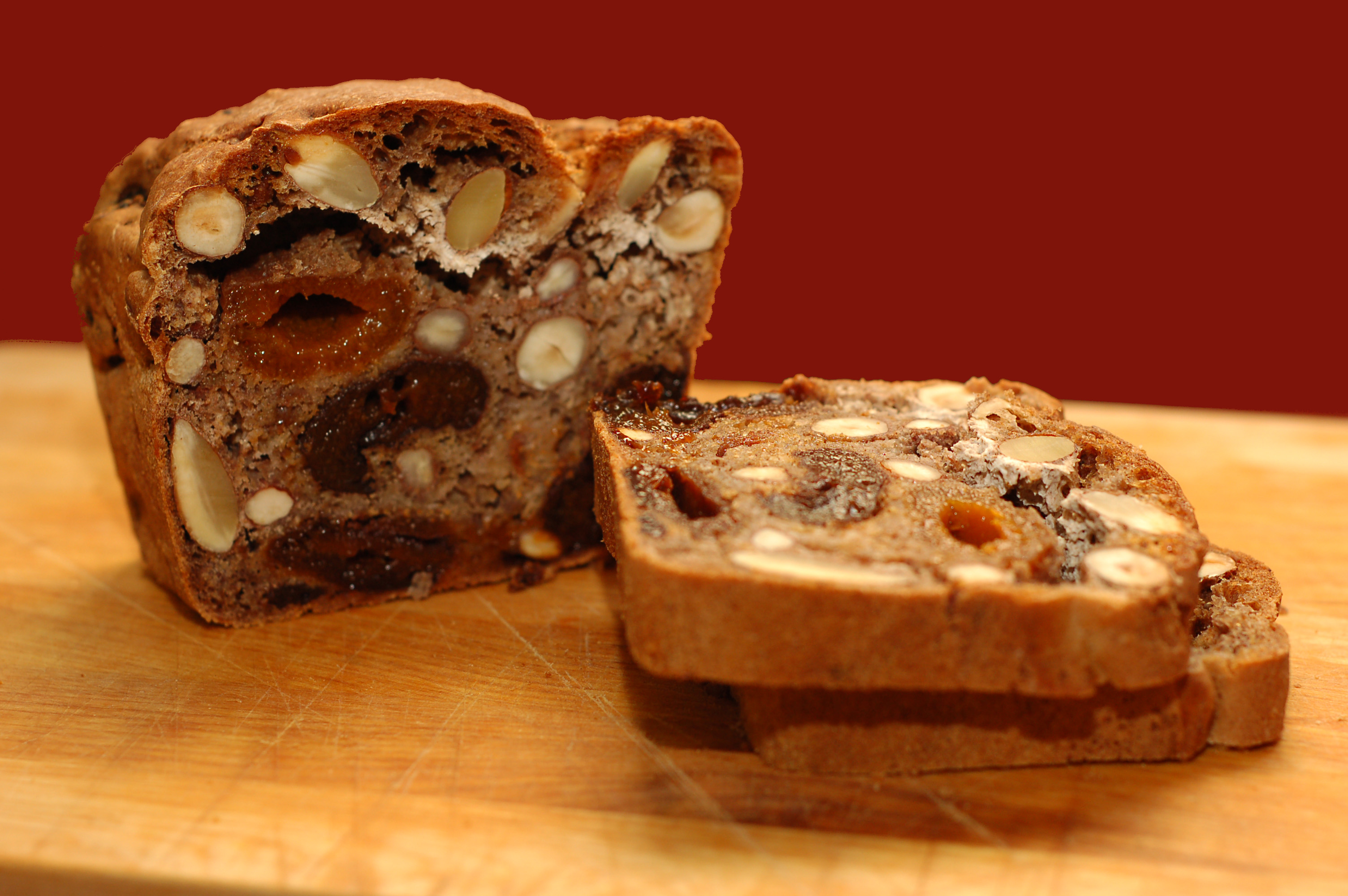
Früchtebrot with apricots, dates, figs and nuts

Früchtebrot (also called Berewecke, Birnenbrot, Hutzenbrot, Hutzelbrot, Kletzenbrot, Schnitzbrot or Zelten) is a sweet, dark bread baked with dried fruit.

Früchtebrot is commonly baked into small oblong loaves. The bread has a juicy, firm texture with visible bits of fruit and nuts. It often contains almonds and maraschino cherries. Früchtebrot has a long shelf life.

== Background ==
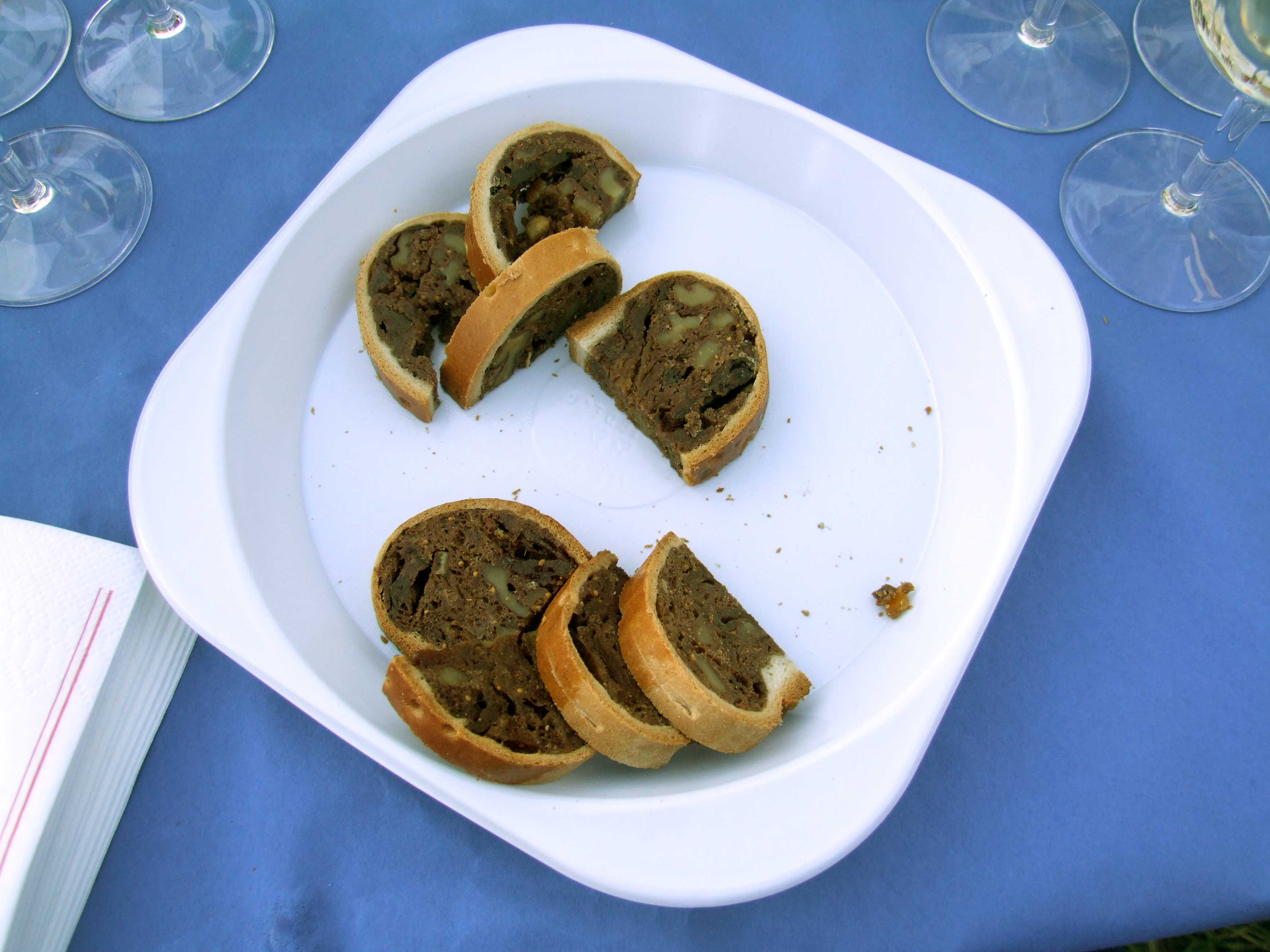
Birnenbrot

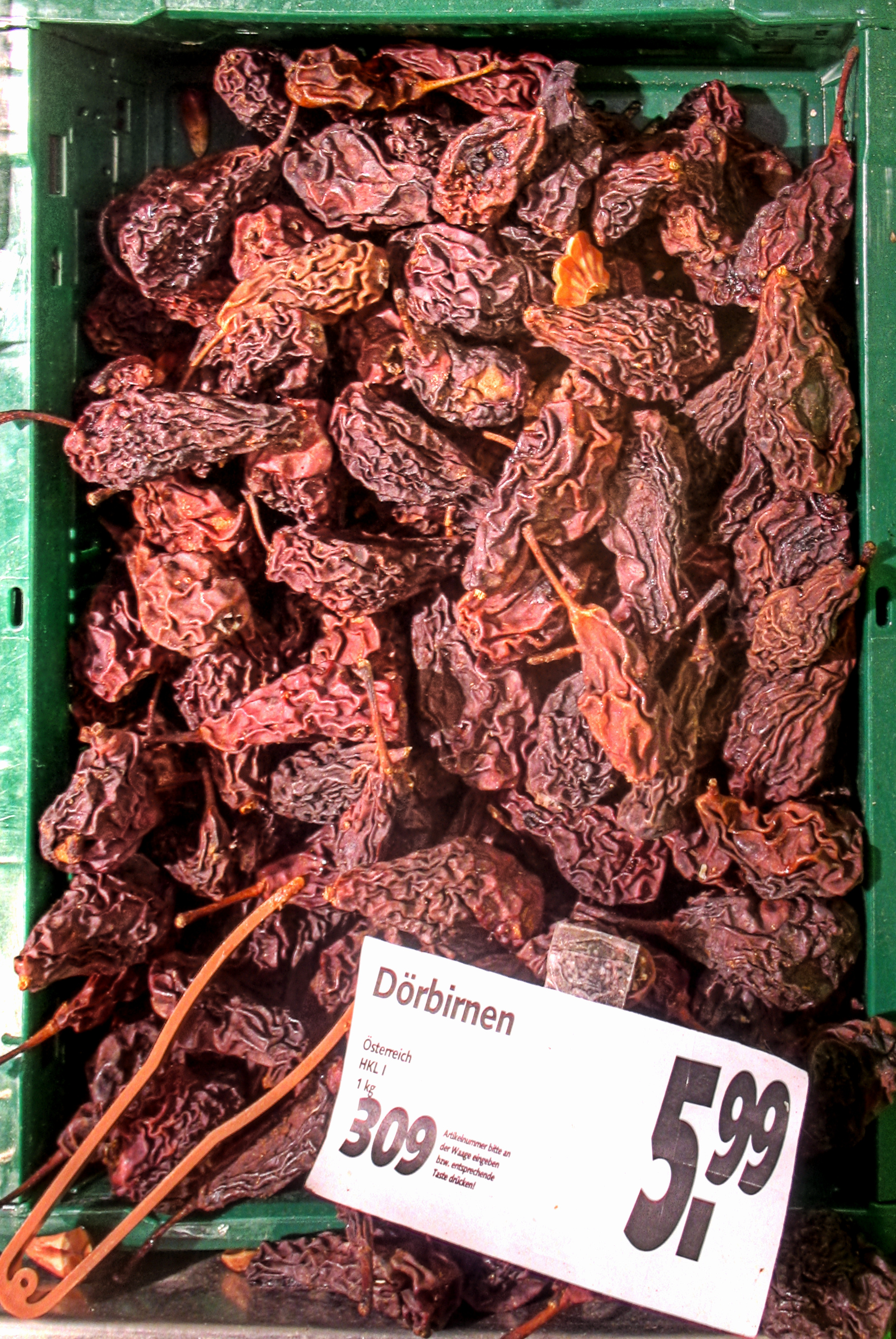
Dried pears ("Kletzen" in Bavarian), giving the name to Kletzenbrot

In southern Germany, Austria as well as South Tyrol and Trentino in Italy, Früchtebrot is most often prepared in advent time with dried pears. Dialectally the pears are known as Hutzeln, Hutzen (Alemannic German) or Kletzen (Bavarian-Austrian) and thus the bread itself is also known as Hutzenbrot or Kletzenbrot. Through better quality of life or import of tropical fruits the bread has developed to be filled with dried fruits such as plums, raisins, apricots, dates, figs, oranges or lemons. Originally Früchtebrot was made without honey, brown sugar or white sugar, with the sweetness coming only from the dried pears. Equally uncommon is Früchtebrot made of wheat dough. Using wheat dough makes the bread look less rustic, but also hinders the combustion of the fruits baked into it.

In upper Allgäu, which was very poor because of its poor soil, "Birnebrot" was eaten at Christmas evening. This was commonly accompanied with a glass of "Obstler" - a high-alcoholic, aromatic schnapps made of apples and pears. Children of poor families sang advent and Christmas songs in front of farm houses and received "Singâte", in other words Birnebrot, as a reward. Nowadays hardly anyone knows of this term any more.

In Bozen (Bolzano) the Bozner Zelten has been prepared at advent time since the Middle Ages.

== Usage ==
Baking Früchtebrot began on Saint Andrew's Day on 30 November. On the night of Saint Andrew's Day, masked young men asked for gifts, including Früchtebrot.

Früchtebrot was a part of the festive food on Saint Nicholas's Day.

On Christmas Eve and Boxing Day Früchtebrot was sliced and dealt out by the father of the family. Children, farmworkers and maids each received their share. To bring luck to the stables, the animals also received Früchtebrot as a gift.

An old engagement tradition is the slicing of Früchtebrot. Women who had reached an age to marry gave the ends of the loaves as gifts to their lovers, with the edges cut smooth to show their affection, or with the edges cut rough to end the relationship.

== In literature ==
Eduard Mörike (1804–1875) dedicated a story called "Stuttgarter Hutzelmännlein" to Früchtebrot:

The Hutzelmännchen gives to the cobbler Seppe, grown tired of his master, a pair of lucky shoes and a loaf of Früchtebrot for his journey. Thus he is well prepared for his journey from Stuttgart over the Swabian Jura to Ulm - and even further...

Thomas Mann describes Früchtebrot as the speciality of the sanatorium in Monstein in his book The Magic Mountain. In the chapter "The great irritation" he writes: "The day-trippers ordered food from the landlady who was happy to serve them: coffee, honey, white bread and Früchtebrot, the speciality of the house."

Many children know of Früchtebrot from the famous children's storybook The Very Hungry Caterpillar.

== See also ==
- Barmbrack, traditional Irish fruit bread
