= The Gastronomical Me =

1943 M.F.K. Fisher book

- Author: M. F. K. Fisher
- Language: English
- Genre: Food memoir
- Published: 1943
- Publisher: Duell, Sloan & Pearce
- OCLC: 1371130
- Dewey Decimal: 926.4
- LC Class: TX649.F5 A3

The Gastronomical Me is a 1943 food memoir by M. F. K. Fisher, following Consider the Oyster and How to Cook a Wolf. The book is an essay collection covering subjects from "her childhood to her life in France, the beginning of World War II, the dissolution of her first marriage, [to] the death of her second husband" and "marked Fisher's emergence as one of the great voices of her time". In 1989, the New York Review of Books called it "her masterpiece" and the "most vivid and sustained of her books, a self-portrait through food spanning the years 1912 to a harrowing visit to Mexico in 1941. Each memory is presented separately, in the form of a self-contained story, with food as its sensual catalyst." Fisher wrote the book from a boarding house in Altadena, California, in northeastern Los Angeles County, where she had isolated herself because she was "recently widowed—her terminally ill husband [Dillwyn Parrish] had shot himself—Fisher was heavily pregnant by a man she never named. The war which she had seen coming in Europe had now finally arrived in America and was consuming the nation's young men. As Wilson rightly points out, The Gastronomical Me makes you shiver at its deep familiarity with death."

Gastronomical Me opens "with an account of a pass made by a fellow student at the girls' boarding school she attended as a teenager, an event that coincided, almost too perfectly, with the first time she tasted an oyster". She contrasted her biological family's uptight approach to food with that of a warm, kindly, culinarily skilled housekeeper hired to help out for a few months; the housekeeper disappeared after she was arrested for murdering her mother. Of her time living in France, she commented that it transformed her because the French "knew flavors as their American counterparts knew baseball batting averages". Centered around Fisher's sensual description of tastes and experiences, the throughline of the book is not satiety but yearning and desire: "We are all hungry, she tells us, but we must remember to make choices, not drift to whatever is at hand. Our hunger unites us; our choices, in restaurants and in life, make us individuals."The book was released in time for the Christmas gift-buying season in 1943, at which time the book columnist of the San Francisco Chronicle concluded, "This is her private, well-considered commentary on the business of living. And more than one reader, a touch weary of autobiographies in praise of pep, will welcome, for a change, an approach in which pepsin is a more important factor". Gastronomical Me was reprinted in the 1980s by North Point Press. It is included in the five-book Fisher anthology The Art of Eating. Gastronomical Me is considered the progenitor of the contemporary food memoir genre, in which personal and sometimes political history is recounted through food; recent examples include Blood, Bones & Butter by Gabrielle Hamilton, Day of Honey by Annia Ciezadlo, and Mastering the Art of Soviet Cooking by Anya von Bremzen. Eat Pray Love by Elizabeth Gilbert has been described as a "bastard descendant".
