= How to Cook a Wolf =

1942 book by MFK Fisher

- First-edition cover
- Author: M.F.K. Fisher
- Publisher: Duell, Sloan and Pearce
- Publication date: May 1942 (revised 1954)
- Pages: 261
- LC Class: TX715 .F542

How to Cook a Wolf by M. F. K. Fisher is an American book about food and cooking during wartime rationing. First published in 1942, How to Cook a Wolf may be the most-lauded of the 20-odd books produced by American food writer Fisher, whose writing has been described as "highly stylized" and so lyrical that she is "basically a Sappho." Nominally about food, home economics, thrift, and preparedness, How to Cook a Wolf has been described "barely a cookbook" and "part experimental cookbook, part 'escape reading material,' and part war protest."

== History ==
How to Cook a Wolf was written following the attack on Pearl Harbor, which led to the American entry in World War II, when Fisher (then known to society as Mrs. Dillwyn Parrish) returned to California from already-war-torn Europe and wrote a well-received guide to blackout curtains and crisis cooking for her father's paper, the Whittier News. The newspaper columns evolved into a book, which she wrote in about a month, and publisher Duell, Sloan and Pearce rushed it into print because of its wartime topicality. A revision ("the Cold War edition") was published in 1954, with Fisher revisiting her own text by way of "marginal notes, footnotes, and a section of additional recipes." The revision "quietly spoke out against the over-indulgences of the postwar years," and included new material on feeding children, an experience that Fisher had not yet had when writing the first edition.

How to Cook a Wolf was anthologized in full in The Art of Eating (with an introduction by Clifton Fadiman), which was first published in 1954 and remains in print. Five chapters were included in posthumous compilation of Fisher's work called The Measure of Her Powers. In 1988, the now-defunct North Point Press reprinted How to Cook a Wolf.

Both the 9/11 terrorist attacks of 2001 and the COVID-19 pandemic led to a resurgence of interest in Wolf. A Vox writer commented during the coronavirus crisis, "I am not recommending How to Cook a Wolf for the recipes. They're 1942 recipes, and even if you wanted to roast a pigeon or jug a hare I have no idea how you would get the ingredients right now. This book has outlived its function as a practical how-to guide." Fisher's biographer Joan Reardon wrote that the overarching theme of How to Cook a Wolf was "the will to survive, whether in wartime or in battle with old age or in a crise de nerfs." A pandemic-era writer agreed, arguing that the essays in How to Cook a Wolf are "an argument for living the best life that you can when everything around you goes to shit."

== Description ==
The book is dedicated to Fisher's friend Lawrence Bachmann, who reportedly came up with the title. The wolf in question "is the one at the door," the ever-allegorical big bad wolf of folk tales, and more precisely, the predator described in Charlotte Perkins Gilman's poem "The Wolf at the Door." As per the brick-house little pig from the folktale collected by the brothers Grimm, the solution to the problem is simply "outsmart him and have him for dinner."

Wolf, along with An Alphabet for Gourmets and A Cordiall Water, is one of three works by Fisher that examine food as a form of self-help. Some critics place How to Cook a Wolf in a poorly studied literary genre known as food memoir, in company with titles like The Alice B. Toklas Cook Book and Mimi Sheraton's From My Mother's Kitchen: Recipes and Reminiscences. An Associated Press writer once characterized it as a "budget cookbook," alongside How to Eat Better for Less Money by James Beard and Sam Aaron, Economy Gastronomy by Sylvia Vaughn Thompson, and A Cookbook for Poor Poets and Others by Ann Rogers.

The book contains 73 recipes, but Orville Prescott, the New York Times reviewer, reported that the book's strengths were not so much in its catalog of recipes as in its "unorthodox, specific and pointed suggestions about cooking various types of food..." The book's adaptable prescriptions are derived from Fisher's precept that there's "no such thing as a new recipe." In 1987, a San Francisco Bay Area writer named Cyra McFadden reported that Fisher had told her: "The book has some terrible recipes...We were just so grateful to get hold of anything." A later writer argued that "the forced minimalism" of the recipes in Wolf was valuable to him because "I couldn't get carried away with exotic ingredients, [so] I was forced to learn the basics."

Per Humanities magazine, "The book is really a literary rather than a culinary accomplishment—ultimately, more book than cook. Fisher's cheekiness in telling readers how to make war cake and then warning them away from it is a small case in point. Much of the book is like that, as Fisher steps slightly offstage of her narrative and confesses a change of mind." Scholar Allison Carruth calls it "an important text for both late modernism and food writing...Through her modernist redefinition of the cookbook and culinary redefinition of modernism, Fisher reveals a nation's growing appetites for industrialized food and the bodily as well as economic power that food promises."

== Reception and legacy ==
The New York Times critic complained, "She has the weird notion that if a soup is rich enough and good enough, it is almost presumptuous to want anything else. Imagine! And she is very scornful and patronizing about desserts, too."

During the back-to-the-land movement of the 1970s, it was said that How to Cook a Wolf became "almost a bible for modern commune dwellers, homesteaders, and other devotees of the simple life...referred to frequently in Mother Earth News and other underground publications." A latter-day practitioner of a similar ideology, Novella Carpenter, references Fisher's dicta on wastefulness in Farm City.

Cherry Pickman wrote a series of poems with titles "stolen" from How to Cook a Wolf. Tamar Adler's An Everlasting Meal has been characterized as a riff on How to Cook a Wolf with "an up-to-date sensibility about cooking and food and the memories associated with kitchenry." Adler recycled several of Fisher's chapter titles ("How to Boil Water") and explicitly credited Fisher as her inspiration: "How to Cook a Wolf is not a cookbook or a memoir or a story about one person or one thing. It is a book about cooking defiantly, amid the mess of war and the pains of bare pantries...I love that book. I have modeled this one on it."

In 2016, How to Cook a Wolf was number 37 on the Guardian's list of 100 best nonfiction books.

== Short film ==
In 1958, Fisher appeared in a five-minute color short film produced by the Wine Advisory Board of San Francisco called "How to Cook a Wolf Quickly".

== Table of contents ==
How to Cook a Wolf
Chapter title	Topic	Notes
Introduction		
How to Be Sage Without Hemlock	Balanced diets	Fisher critiques the contemporary attitude towards meal planning and suggests an alternative approach to maintaining a balanced diet.
How to Catch the Wolf	Creative economy	Fisher describes and critiques some of the efforts women take to be thrifty in times of need.
How to Distribute Your Virtue	Thrift	The general topic is frugality, about which Fisher wrote: "There are many other ways to save money, some of them written in cookbooks for people to study, and some of them only hidden in the minds of those who might have been hungrier without them." Allison Carruth describes this chapter as "form of a montage: an almost incoherent primer that combines the traditional and the modern, the technological and the rudimentary, and the time-intensive and the labor-saving."
How to Boil Water	Soup	Recommends Sheila Hibben's Kitchen Manual and Ambrose Heath's Good Soups; recipes for Chinese consommé, Parisian onion soup, chowder, cream of potato soup, gaspacho, cold buttermilk soup, minestrone, green garden soup, potage Else
How to Greet the Spring	Seafood	Recipes for salmon cakes, Hawaiian shrimps, shrimp and egg curry, baked tuna with mushroom sauce,
How Not to Boil an Egg	Eggs	Recipes for French omelette, basic soufflé omelette, "frittata of zucchini (for example)", basic foo yeung, eggs in hell, eggs obstáculos, scrambled eggs
How to Keep Alive	Poverty	Fisher explains how to make a dish she calls "sludge," designed to provide nutrition in times when there is no money available at all.
How to Rise Up Like New Bread	Bread	Recipes for white bread, hot loaf, Addie's quick bucket-bread
How to be Cheerful Through Starving	Attitude and dignity	Fisher explains how to maintain a dignified attitude about food in times of need, using her friend Sue as an example.
How to Carve the Wolf	Meat, offal	Recipes for bœuf tartare, crackling bread, baked ham slice, baked ham in cream, mock duck, prune roast, (Note: The prune roast recipe was elsewhere recommended as "marvelous." Fisher's biographer asserted that as a home cook, roast beef was "a dish Mary Frances executed to perfection.") "Aunt Gwen's cold shape (!)", tête de veau, calves' brains, kidneys in sherry, sausage or sardine pie, "an English curry", Turkish hash
How to Make a Pigeon Cry	Poultry, game	Recipes for kasha, roast pigeon, rabbit in casserole, jugged hare, partridge or pheasant and sauerkraut, Normandy pheasant; chapter includes a quote from John Wecker's Secrets of Art and Nature (1660) with directions for roasting a goose alive "as part of her encouragement to cooks faced with rationing, assuring them that their talents could conquer and transform the most bizarre kinds of meats."
How to Pray for Peace	Starches	Recipes for quick potato soup, Chinese rice, Napolitana sauce for spaghetti, Southern spoon bread, polenta, beef sauce for polenta
How to Be Content with a Vegetable Love	Vegetables	Recipe for "petits pois more-or-less à la Française"
How to Make a Great Show	Household make-dos	Recipes for mouthwash, monkey soap, regular soap, other nonsense she found amusing in old books of household hints
How to Have a Sleek Pelt	Pet food	Fisher explains how to feed pets with economy.
How to Comfort Sorrow	Comfort food and dessert	Recipes for war cake, tomato soup cake, baked apples, cinnamon milk, Edith's gingerbread, wine sauce, hard sauce, "date delight", sweet potato pudding, "rice and spice", Riz à l'Impératrice
How to Be a Wise Man	Food education	Fisher explains her approach to feeding children and teaching them about food.
How to Lure the Wolf	Kitchen supplies and garments	Fisher explains how to dress in the kitchen and how to clean.
How to Drink to the Wolf	Alcoholic beverages	Recipes for half-and-half cocktail and faux vodka
How Not to Be an Earthworm	Emergencies	Fisher explains how to prepare food for wartime emergencies, particularly blackouts.
How to Practice True Economy	Luxury dishes	Recipes for shrimp pâté, eggs with anchovies, bœuf moreno, poulet à la mode de beaune, colonial dessert, fruits aux sept liqueurs (Fisher "apologises, given the year, for [this recipe's] craziness and seeming impossibility, while 'wolf whuffs through the keyhole'")
Conclusion		

== See also ==
- Rationing in the United States § World War II

== Sources ==
- Carruth, Allison (2013). "'Luxury Feeding' and War Rations: Food Writing at Midcentury". Global Appetites: American Power and the Literature of Food. Cambridge University Press. pp. 49–89. doi:10.1017/cbo9781139507400.003. ISBN 978-1-139-50740-0. LCCN 2012031891. OCLC 846494857.
- Fisher, Mary Frances Kennedy (2004). The Art of Eating: 50th Anniversary Edition. Houghton Mifflin Harcourt. ISBN 978-0-544-17743-7. LCCN 2003026124.
- Heitman, Danny (Winter 2023). "M.F.K. Fisher Taught Americans How to Nourish Bodies and Souls: Looking back at a great writer". Humanities. Vol. 44, no. 1. National Endowment for the Humanities. ISSN 0018-7526.
- Neuhaus, Jessamyn (1999). "The Way to a Man's Heart: Gender Roles, Domestic Ideology, and Cookbooks in the 1950s". Journal of Social History. 32 (3): 529–555. doi:10.1353/jsh/32.3.529. ISSN 0022-4529. JSTOR 3789341.
- Raber, Karen (2017). "Animals at the Table: Performing Meat in Early Modern England and Europe". In Raber, Karen; Mattfeld, Monica (eds.). Performing Animals. Penn State University Press. doi:10.1515/9780271080789-003. ISBN 978-0-271-08078-9. S2CID 246246212.
- Reardon, Joan (2004). Poet of the Appetites: The Lives and Loves of M.F.K. Fisher. New York: North Point Press. ISBN 9780865476219. LCCN 2004006113. OCLC 54817141. OL 24929839M.
- Smith, Caroline J. (November 6, 2019). ""Writer. Eater. Cook.": Deconstructing the Feminist/Housewife Debate in the Works of Ruth Reichl". Women's Studies. 48 (7): 661–679. doi:10.1080/00497878.2019.1667805. ISSN 0049-7878. S2CID 210557927.
