= Depression cake =

Type of cake commonly made during the Great Depression

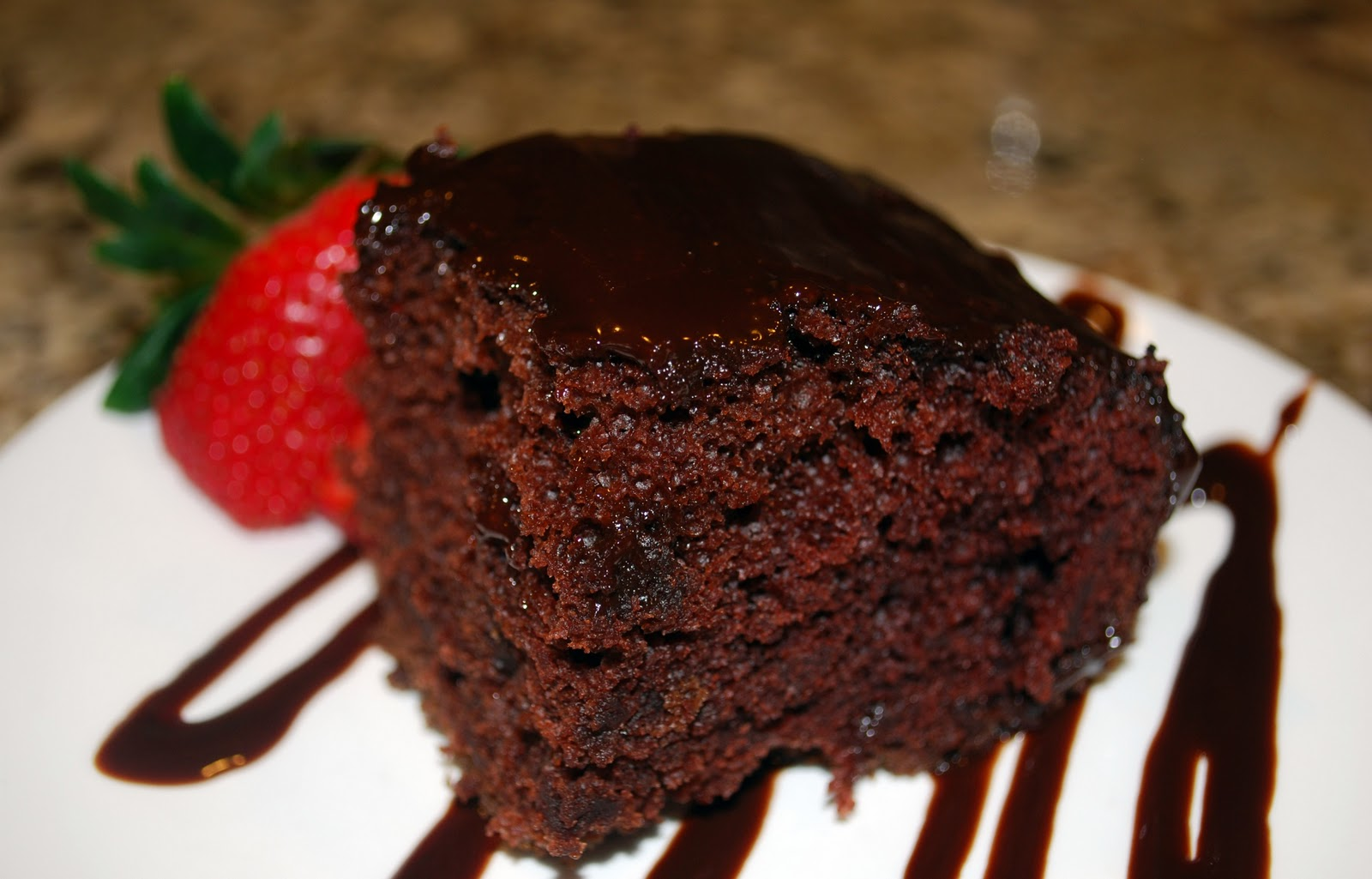
- A modern chocolate depression-style cake
- Alternative names: Milkless Eggless Butterless Cake, Boiled Raisin Cake, War Cake, Wacky Cake
- Type: Cake
- Place of origin: United States
- Main ingredients: Flour, apples or pears, raisins or prunes, spices (cinnamon, allspice, cloves, nutmeg), nuts (walnuts, almonds, or pecans)

Depression cake, also called wacky cake or war cake, is a type of cake that was commonly made during the Great Depression. The ingredients include little or no milk, sugar, butter, or eggs, because the ingredients were then either expensive or hard to obtain. Similar cakes are known as "War Cake", as they avoided ingredients that were scarce or were being conserved for the use of soldiers. A common depression cake is also known as "Boiled Raisin Cake", "Milkless, Eggless, Butterless Cake", or "Poor Man's Cake". "Boiled" refers to the boiling of raisins with the sugar and spices to make a syrup base early in the recipe. However, some bakers do include butter. Boiled raisin-type cakes date back at least to the American Civil War.

== History ==
Depression cake has been referred to as "War Cake" by texts dating back to World War I. In a pamphlet distributed by the United States Food Administration in 1918 entitled "War Economy in Food", War Cake is listed under "Recipes for Conservation Sweets". The United States Food Administration stressed the importance of reducing sugar consumption during the war and offered molasses, corn syrup, and raisins in its place.

When the Great Depression hit America following the Stock Market Crash of 1929, families were forced to stretch their budgets and "make do" with minimal and cheap ingredients when it came to cooking. Some women had to feed their families on $5 per week (equivalent to $94 in 2025). Dessert became a luxury for most, and depression cake was a more affordable alternative to other cakes that used milk, eggs, and butter. Affordability was achieved through ingredient substitution. For example, shortening was substituted for butter, water was substituted for milk, and baking powder was substituted for eggs. Depression cake is just one of many examples of ingredient substitution during the Great Depression, as some women took full advantage of the practice by making mock foods such as mock apple pie and mock fish.

Radio shows and women's periodicals played a large role in circulating the recipe for depression cake during the Great Depression. Betty Crocker's Cooking Hour was one such show that provided women with budget-friendly recipes. General Mills, owner of Betty Crocker, employed nutritionists and cooks to experiment with different ways of "ruining" a cake, such as ingredient omission. Loring Schuler's Ladies' Home Journal was a publication that also offered baking tips during the Great Depression, recommending replacing eggs with baking powder and using inexpensive grains and produce. A recipe titled "War Cake" was published in M.F.K. Fisher's book How to Cook a Wolf and republished in her The Art of Eating; it uses bacon grease on the premise that spices will mask its taste.

Praised for its practicality and declared to be "the most worthwhile cake ever made," depression cake was still baked in America as of the late 20th century. The recipe for it has been featured in an array of publications such as The Telegraph-Herald, The Pittsburgh Press, and The Modesto Bee.

The cake is a popular delicacy at bake sales in numerous rural regions of the United States. The dessert has also been included in 4-H competitions as well as home economics textbooks after World War II. During the COVID-19 pandemic, depression cake regained popularity as a dessert to bake during quarantine.

== See also ==
- Bulldog gravy, another Great Depression era food
- Rationing in the United States
- Water pie, an inexpensive pie
