= Tomato soup cake =

Spice cake made with tomato soup

A slice of tomato soup layer cake

Tomato soup cake is a spice cake that contains canned tomato soup, often with chopped nuts and a cream cheese frosting. It typically takes the forms of a layer cake, Bundt cake or cupcakes, using spices such as allspice, cinnamon, and cloves. The tomato soup adds moisture, in the same way milk or oil does in other cakes. Such cake originated in the United States and still belongs chiefly to American cuisine. It has been known under a number of names, including Mystery Cake, Believe It or Not Cake, Halloween Cake, Love Apple Cake, (Note: Love Apple being an early name for tomato) Rosy Spice Cake, and You'll Be Surprised Cake.

The first recipes for tomato soup cake emerged in the 1920s, and the cake gained popularity in America during the Great Depression. While eggs and butter were scarce, tomato soup was broadly available and could replace those ingredients in a cake. This usage would continue until the end of the Second World War. It was promoted by soup makers including Campbell's and Heinz, as well as the Philadelphia Cream Cheese brand. The earliest version promoted by Campbell's came in the 1940s, and initially took the form of a steamed pudding, only later becoming cakey; (Note: Sources differ on whether the first date was 1940 or 1949.) Campbell's claims to have invented the dessert while trying to create a steamed fruit and nut pudding dessert.

Recipes were published in institutional cooking manuals, cookbooks, newspapers and magazines. M. F. K. Fisher included a recipe in How to Cook a Wolf (1942), stating "This is a pleasant cake, which keeps well and puzzles people who ask what kind it is. It can be made in a moderate oven while you are cooking other things, which is always sensible and makes you feel rather noble, in itself a small but valuable pleasure." As was typical of Fisher's wartime cookery, the recipe in How to Cook a Wolf contained less butter and milk than the version provided by Campbell's.

The popularity of the dish had lessened by the 1950s, when carrot cakes, spiced, and frosted with cream cheese took their place in American home cooking. Cooks have continued to prepare the cake. A recipe in the 1964 edition of Joy of Cooking, praised the cake as tasty, offering the defence: "why shouldn't it? The deep secret is tomato, which after all is a fruit." Sylvia Plath was a fan, making the cake on the day she wrote her poem "Death & Co." (1965). In Canada, some home cooks continue to trade recipes.

== See also ==
- List of cakes

== Bibliography ==
- Anderson, Jean (1997). The American Century Cook-Book. New York, London: C. Potter. ISBN 0-517-70576-1.
- Clarkson, Janet (2010). Soup: A Global History. The Edible Series. London: Reaktion Books Ltd. ISBN 978-1-86189-774-9.
- Driver, Elizabeth (2008). Culinary Landmarks: A Bibliography of Canadian Cookbooks, 1825-1949. Toronto, Ontario: University of Toronto Press. ISBN 978-0-8020-4790-8.
- Fisher, M. F. K. (1942). How to Cook a Wolf. New York: World Book Company.
- Hyman, Clarissa (2019). Tomato: A Global History. The Edible Series. London: Reaktion Books Ltd. ISBN 978-1-78914-083-5.
- Levene, Alysa (2016). Cake: The Short, Surprising History of Our Favourite Bakes. London: Headline. ISBN 978-1-4722-2684-6.
- Lovegren, Sylvia (2005) [1995]. Fashionable Food: Seven Decades of Food Fads. Chicago, Illinois: University of Chicago Press. ISBN 0-226-49407-1.
- Moses, Kate (2014). "Baking for Sylvia". In Cognard-Black, Jennifer; Goldthwaite, Melissa A (eds.). Books That Cook: The Making of a Literary Meal. New York and London: New York University Press. ISBN 978-1-4798-3021-3.
- Parks, Stella (2017). BraveTart: Iconic American Desserts. New York & London: W.W. Norton & Company. ISBN 978-0-393-23986-7.
- Smith, Andrew F (2000). Souper Tomatoes: The Story of America's Favorite food. New Brunswick, New Jersey: Rutger's University Press. ISBN 0-8135-2752-X.
