= Floating island (disambiguation) =

A floating island is a mass of floating aquatic plants, mud, and peat.

Floating island may also refer to:

- Very large floating structure, a real or fictional artificial floating "island"
- Floating island (fiction), the concept in fiction
- Floating island (dessert), a French dessert
- The Floating Island (Head novel), a 1673 novel by Richard Head
- Floating Island (novel), a 1930 novel by Anne Parrish
- The Floating Island (Haydon novel), a 2006 novel by Elizabeth Haydon
- The "Floating Island" or "Angel Island," a recurring location in the Sonic the Hedgehog series
- Floating islands (Bingöl), mass of floating aquatic plants in the form of islands on a lake in Bingöl Province, Turkey
- Floating Islands (album), an album by Lotte Anker
