= Sembawang Hills Food Centre =

Hawker centre in Ang Mo Kio, Singapore

- 三巴旺山熟食中心 (Chinese); Pusat Makanan Sembawang Hills (Malay) செம்பவாங் மலைகள் உணவு மையம் (Tamil)
- Interactive map of the Sembawang Hills Food Centre area
- Alternative names: Jalan Leban Food Centre

General information
- Location: Ang Mo Kio, Singapore, 590 Upper Thomson Road; 069184
- Coordinates: 1°22′20″N 103°49′44″E
- Opened: 1974; 52 years ago
- Renovated: 26 February 2003; 23 years ago
- Cost: S$332,000
- Landlord: National Environment Agency

Technical details
- Floor area: 844.38 m^{2} (9,088.8 sq ft)

Renovating team
- Architects: Liu & Wo Architects

Other information
- Number of stores: 36
- Public transit: TE6 Mayflower

Sembawang Hills Food Centre, also known as Jalan Leban Food Centre, is a hawker centre located in Ang Mo Kio, at the 7 mi (11 km) of Upper Thomson Road.

== History ==
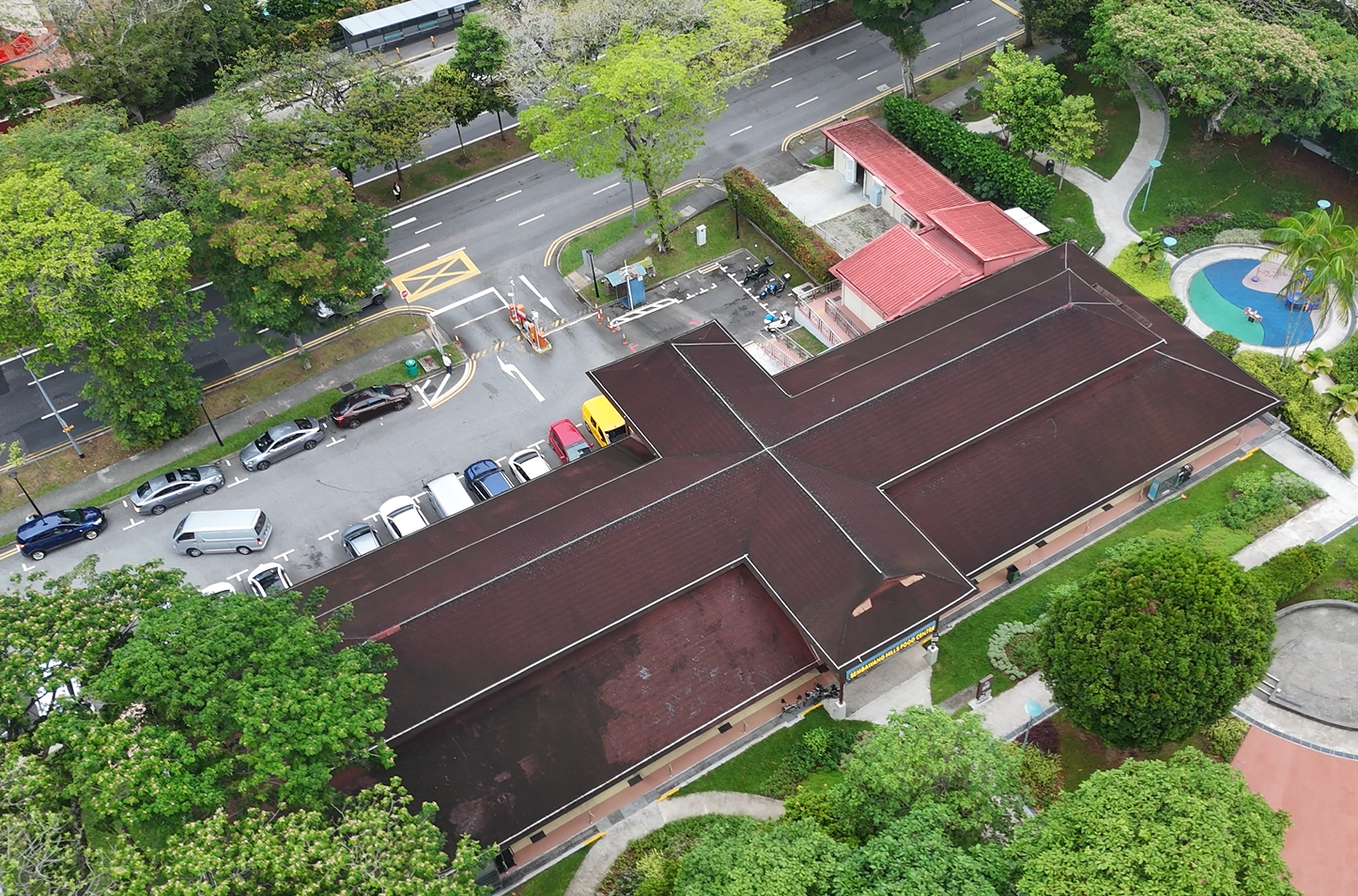
Sembawang Hills Food Centre top-down. Feb 2026

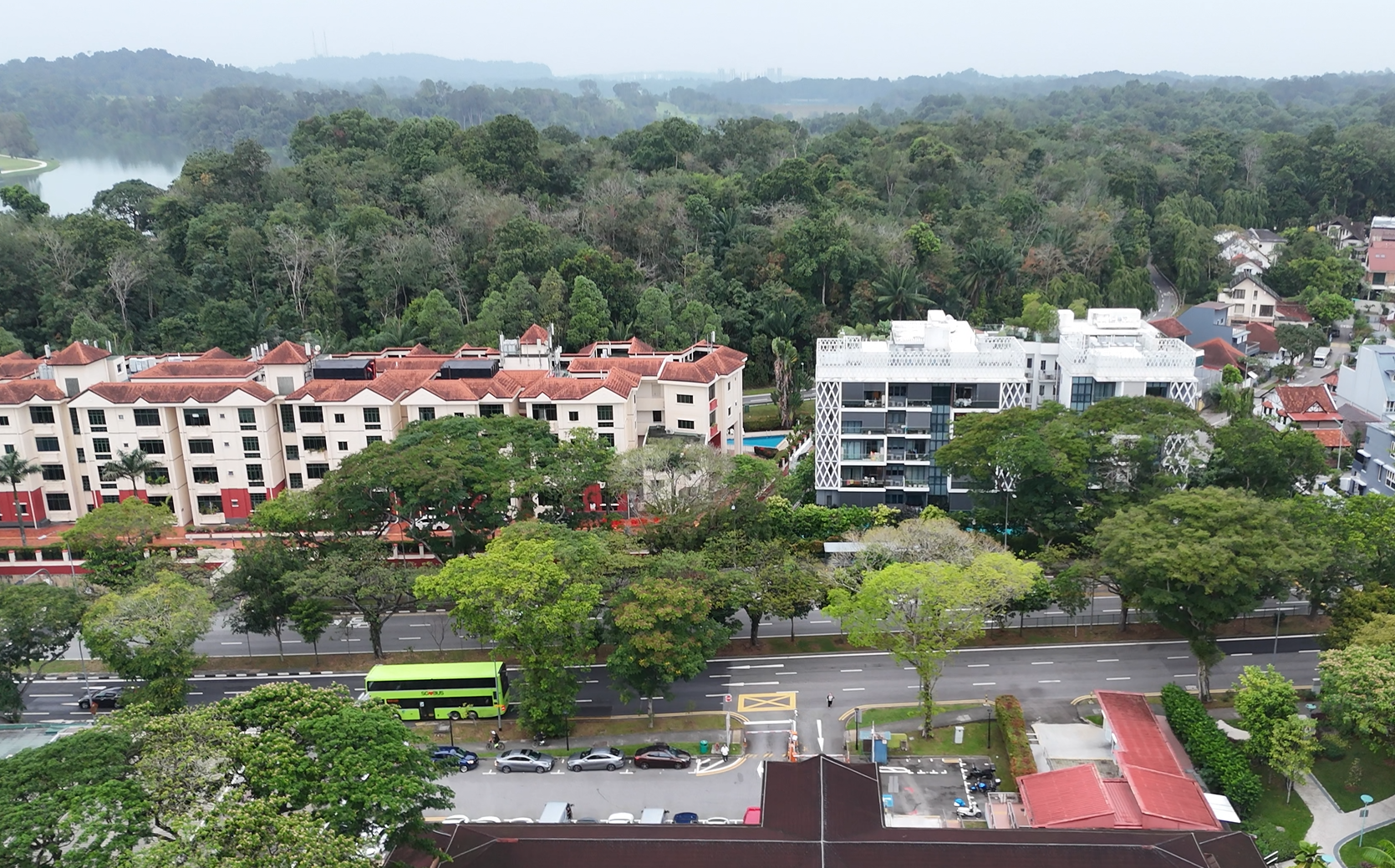
Sembawang Hills Food Centre facing the central catchment. February 2026.

Announced in early 1974, Sembawang Hills Food Centre was developed alongside the development of Ang Mo Kio New Town. At a cost of S$332,000, construction of the hawker centre was completed nearing the end of 1974. The hawker centre had 40 stalls and 24 parking lots.

In late 2002, as part of the hawker centre upgrading programme by the Ministry of Environment, Sembawang Hills was upgraded, with its roof, tiles, and facade being replaced. Initially, hawkers speculated that the hawker centre could be replaced with a two-storey building with the hawker centre on the top floor, a wet market on the ground floor, and a basement carpark. However, the hawker centre remained as a single storey building, disproving speculations. Renovations were completed on 26 February 2003, and the number of stalls reduced to 36.

== Present day ==
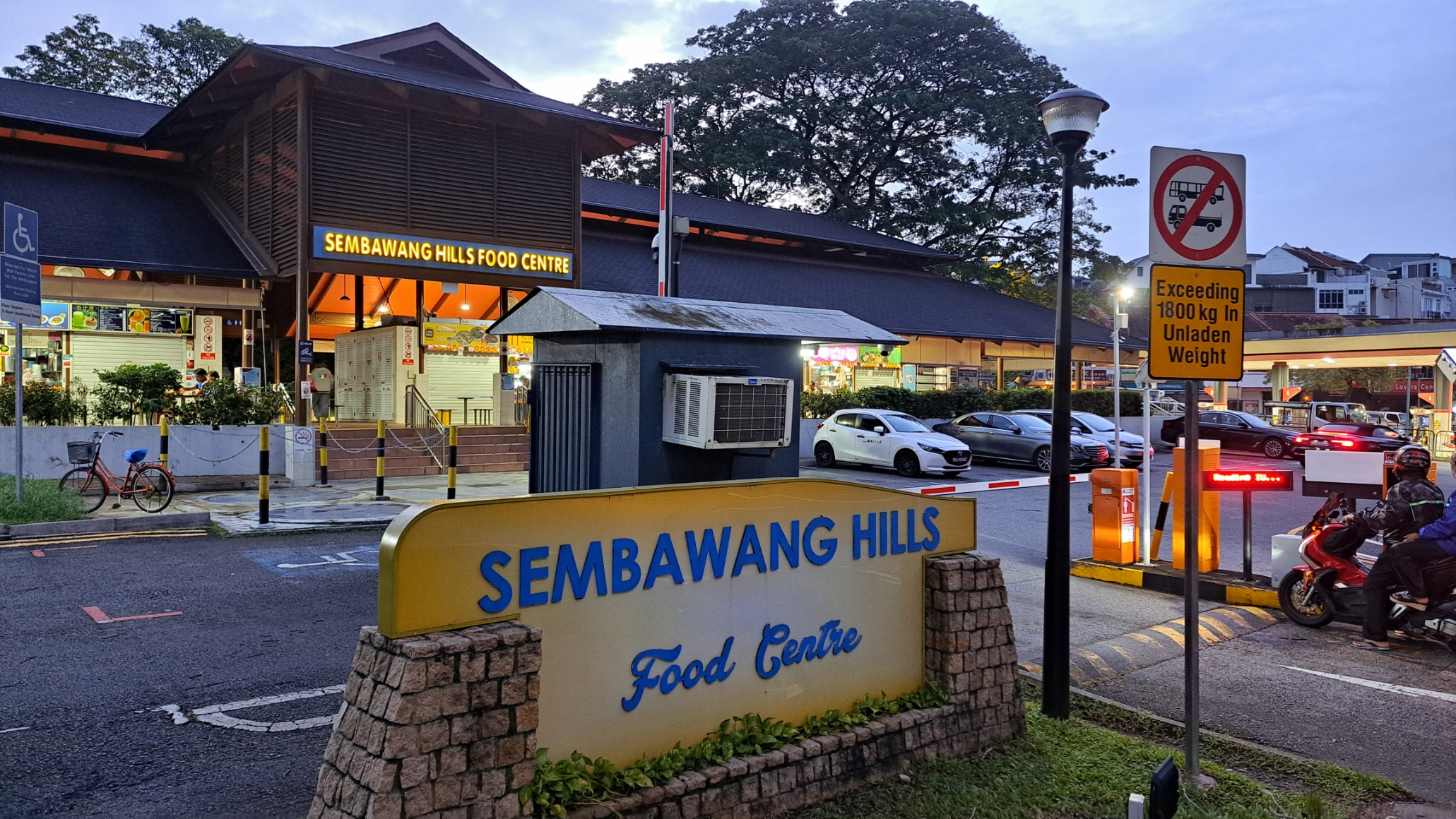
Sembawang Hills in 2025

Sembawang Hills Food Centre serves the nearby Sembawang Hills estate. In 2017, Sembawang Hills Shui Kueh, a chwee kueh stall, was featured in the Michelin Guide. Other popular dishes at the hawker centre include popiah and siu yuk.

== See also ==
- Hawker centre
- Singaporean cuisine
