= Ghost Town Royals =

Children's baseball team from Oakland, California

The Oakland Royals is a children's and youth baseball team in a neighborhood of Oakland, California locally known as Ghost Town, that was founded in 2004 for children ages four to thirteen. It was founded by Roscoe Bryant and a film was made about it by Gene Corr in 2010, called Ghost Town to Havana.

The team plays in a league consisting of five teams.

In their first year, the Royals lost every game. After their trip to Havana, they turned things around and won their next 48 games.

== Background ==
Roscoe and Lehi Bryant founded the team after witnessing the murder of Thomas Simpson, a 15-year-old freshman at McClymonds High School, in front of their house in 2004. They wanted to create an opportunity for the neighborhood's children, to keep them off the street. When they launched the team, they lacked resources and experience. A donation of a 1988 Dodge van helped them to provide transportation for the players.

The equipment for the team was originally donated by Goodwill and Salvation Army. In their first year, the Royals lost every game they played.

Bryant sought to expose the players to a wider world, and would arrange games across the San Francisco Bay in San Francisco. In 2010, Bryant brought the team to Cuba, at the urging of film director Eugene Corr. Bryant was reluctant at first to take the trip, due to his skepticism about how his program and neighborhood are often portrayed in media. He was persuaded when Corr agreed not to include stereotypical drug scenes, pimps, guns, or gangs in the film.

== Ghost Town to Havana documentary ==
A documentary film called Ghost Town to Havana was released on September 15, 2015 about the team's 2013 trip to Cuba. It was directed by Gene Corr. Corr conceived the idea for the film in 2007, when he met Nicolas Reyes, the coach in Havana featured in the documentary. The film was screened for free on October 27, 2015, at Oakland's Grand Lake Theatre.
