= Farm City: The Education of an Urban Farmer =

2009 book by Novella Carpenter

- Author: Novella Carpenter
- Publication date: 2009
- ISBN: 9781594202216
- OCLC: 276819186

Farm City: The Education of an Urban Farmer is a 2009 memoir by Novella Carpenter. The book describes her extensive garden in Ghost Town, a run down neighborhood a mile from downtown Oakland, California. Farm City was listed by some reviewers as one of the top books of 2009.
