= Novella Carpenter =

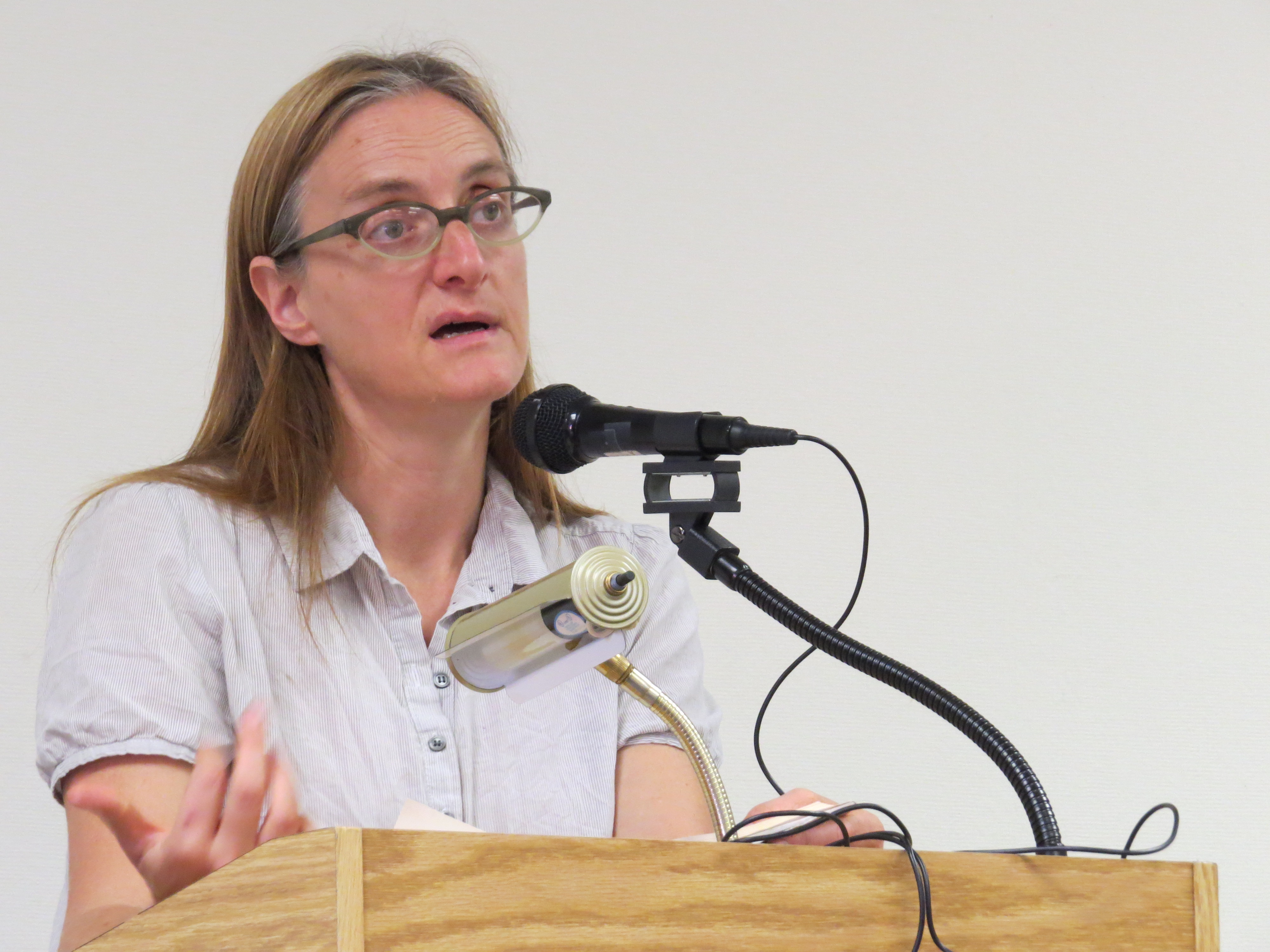
- Carpenter speaking at Hayward Public Library in October 2014
- Occupations: Journalist, Urban Farmer
- Writing career
- Language: English
- Genre: Non-fiction
- Notable works: Don't Jump! The Northwest Winter Blues Survival Guide (2002); Farm City: The Education of an Urban Farmer (2009); The Essential Urban Farmer (2011); Gone Feral: Tracking My Dad Through the Wild (2014)
- Website: www.novellacarpenter.net

Novella Carpenter is the author of the 2009 memoir Farm City: The Education of an Urban Farmer. The book describes her extensive garden in Ghost Town, a run-down neighborhood about a mile from downtown Oakland, California. Farm City was listed by some reviewers as one of the top books of 2009, and it was the 2014 selection of the Marin County Free Library, City Public Libraries of Marin County and Dominican University of California "One Book One Marin" reading program.

== Biography ==
Carpenter studied biology and English at the University of Washington and graduated from the School of Journalism at the University of California, Berkeley where she studied with Michael Pollan. She has written for Mother Jones, Salon, and SF Gate. She is also the co-author (with Traci Vogel) of Don't Jump! The Northwest Winter Blues Survival Guide, published in 2002 by Sasquatch Books. She is currently (2017) an adjunct professor of Environmental Studies at the University of San Francisco, teaching urban agriculture and writing in the university's College of Arts and Sciences.

In March 2011, the City of Oakland told Carpenter she would have to close her Ghost Town Farm because she was selling excess produce without a permit. In April 2011, after an extensive debate that prompted officials' review of the city's policies regarding urban farming, Carpenter was granted a Minor Conditional Use Permit for her 4,500-square-foot urban residential plot, allowing her to keep more than 40 animals, including ducks, chickens, rabbits, pigs, and goats.

Carpenter's "how-to" guide for urban farmers, The Essential Urban Farmer, co-authored with Willow Rosenthal, was released by Penguin Press on December 27, 2011. A memoir, Gone Feral: Tracking My Dad Through the Wild, released on June 12, 2014, also by Penguin Press, was selected as a Library Journal Best Book of 2014 and a Northern California Book Award Nominee for Best Creative Nonfiction of 2014.
