= The Story of Appleby Capple =

Alphabet book by Anne Parrish

First edition (publ. Harper & Brothers)

The Story of Appleby Capple is a complex children's alphabet book by Anne Parrish, with an alliterative narrative.

Each chapter focuses on a different letter that is used to tell a story. Appleby Capple is a five-year-old on his way to Cousin Clement's 99th birthday party; he has a number of adventures looking for the perfect present: a Zebra butterfly.

The text is accompanied by many cartoon-like illustrations by the author. The book was first published in 1950 and was a Newbery Honor recipient in 1951.
