= The Dream Coach =

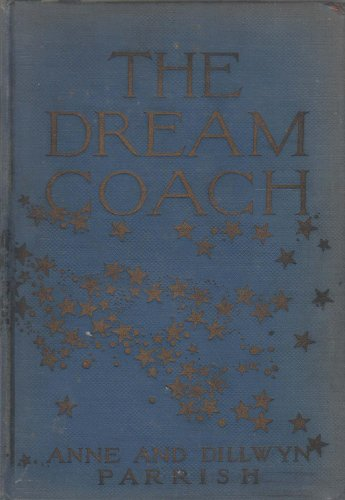
First edition, 1924

The Dream Coach is a 1924 children's fantasy book written and illustrated by siblings Anne and Dillwyn Parrish. It is a collection of four fairytale-like stories linked by the theme of a Dream Coach, which travels around the world bringing dreams to children. The book earned a Newbery Honor in 1925.

== Stories ==
- The Seven White Dreams of the King's Daughter
- Goran's Dream
- A Bird Cage With Tassels of Purple and Pearls (Three Dreams of a Little Chinese Emperor)
- King Philippe's Dream
