= Bulldog gravy =

Great Depression–era food

Bulldog gravy was a Great Depression–era foodstuff associated with American coal miners, which consists of a mixture of milk, flour and grease. Contemporary recipes give the proportions as "1/4 cup (~60 mL) drippings from frying sausage, bacon, chicken, or pork chops, mixed with 1/4 cup (~60 mL) flour and 2 cups (~480 mL) milk".

It is eaten with beans or over a "water sandwich" (bread soaked in lard and water). A version where water is used instead of milk also exists.

These dishes preexisted the Great Depression and were common foods among the poor at least before World War I and likely earlier. In the Midwest Bulldog Gravy was known as Monkey Gravy, but there it was often made without any fat. Lard Sandwiches were common (a slice of bread spread with lard). Open face if with beans or a closed sandwich for a school child's lunch. Soaking the bread in water and lard was unknown. Dessert would be an open face lard sandwich sprinkled with a spoonful of sugar.

== Popular culture ==
Bulldog gravy is mentioned in the lyrics of the Appalachian lament Man of Constant Sorrow (or Girl of Constant Sorrow, depending on the performer).

It is also mentioned in the lyrics of Sarah Ogan Gunning's "Come All You Coal Miners", covered with the title shortened to "Coalminers" by the alt-country group Uncle Tupelo, on their album, March 16–20, 1992.

== See also ==
- Depression cake – another Great Depression-era food
