= Water pie =

Dessert with translucent custard filling

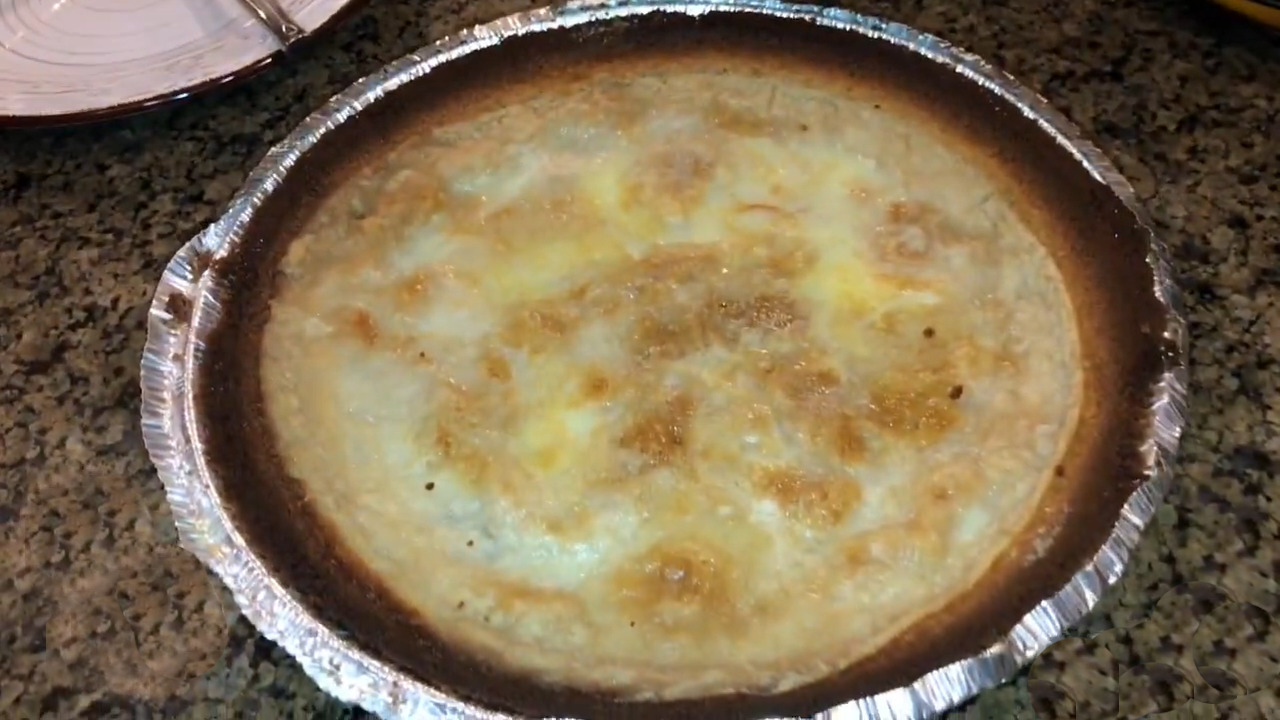
A homemade water pie

Water pie is a type of pie with a translucent custard-like filling made primarily from water, along with sugar, flour, butter and sometimes vanilla extract. The recipe originated in the late 1800s and was also made during the Great Depression. It experienced a revival during the 2020s amidst the COVID-19 pandemic and its economic impact.

== History ==
Simplified recipes with alternative ingredients, including desserts such as depression cake, were popular throughout history in times when ingredients were scarce or unaffordable. Water pie in particular dates back to the late nineteenth century. Through versions of the recipe in cookbooks from the Great Depression in the United States, it resurfaced thanks to TikTok users and food blogs in the 2020s, during the COVID-19 pandemic, many of which highlighted its low cost and simplicity.

== Ingredients ==
The pie is made by adding water mixed with sugar, flour and butter, and sometimes some spice such as vanilla or cinnamon, to a pie crust. The starch in the flour makes the mixture set and thicken, thus acquiring a custard-like consistency. Soft drinks such as Sprite may be used in place of water.

== See also ==
- Depression cake – Type of cake commonly made during the Great Depression
- Toast sandwich – Sandwich with toast filling
- Chipped beef – Sliced dried beef product
- Spam – Canned pork product
- Betty Crocker – Brand and fictional character
- Chwee kueh – Chinese steamed rice cake
