= As They Were =

Essays by M.F.K. Fisher

- Author: M.F.K. Fisher
- Language: English
- Genre: Collected essays, memoir
- Published: 1982
- Publisher: Alfred A. Knopf
- Publication place: United States
- ISBN: 9780394524009
- OCLC: 8172146
- Dewey Decimal: 081
- LC Class: 81048130

As They Were is a 1982 collection of essays by M.F.K. Fisher, including several tales about her childhood in Whittier, California. As They Were (along with Long Ago in France and Sister Age) was one of the books she wrote at Last House in Glen Ellen, California. Fisher was a "revered" food writer, but this volume almost entirely avoids the topic on which she built her reputation, which some reviewers found disappointing. In As They Were, Fisher recalls visits to the Mission Inn in Riverside, stays at Swiss inns, kitchens in Provence in which she cooked, hotels and restaurants she patronized in Aix and Arles, and journeys by sea. Library Journal said the book was filled with "her usual delightful prose" and recommended it for purchase by libraries with a "sophisticated clientele." Several of the pieces had previously been published in magazines such as The New Yorker and The Atlantic Monthly.

== Reception ==
The writer Carolyn See, reviewing for the Los Angeles Times, said the book made her feel uneasy: "All that good-life business: What if a good cafe au lait doesn't make a good life?...one notices M.F.K. speaking serenely of 'my husband,' an all-purpose costume that has been cut to fit several men." See's overall impression was of narcissism and hedonism and, yet, as she continues reading Fisher's writing, "The heart melts. M.F.K. God loves you." Reviewer Lawrence W. Markert thought the book was simply a worthy detour from edible subject matter to the similar genre of travel writing. Reviewer Fred Smock thought "She does not travel, strictly speaking; she takes up residence, and so is privileged to see, hear and taste a life fuller than any tourist."

Reviewer Amanda Heller found that one chapter could be seen at least three ways: as reflection on "housekeeping in the South of France, a metaphorical reflection on the moral texture of Provençal life, or an ode to paradise lost." In The Boston Phoenix, reviewer Barbara Wallraff felt that "whatever Fisher turns her limpid gaze on turns limpid and lovely, too. As They Were is intimate, but never in an embarrassing, spill-your-guts way." Wallraff noted that "the world that Fisher inhabits seems a wonderful place because of the way she has made it relate to itself. In As They Were she’s accomplished this mostly with the prefaces, newly written to introduce the various essays."
