= Sembawang Hills =

Subzone of Ang Mo Kio Planning Area in Singapore

- Subzone of Ang Mo Kio Planning Area

Name transcription(s)
  - Chinese: 三巴旺山
  - Malay: Sembawang Hills
  - Tamil: செம்பவாங் மலைகள்
- Interactive map of Sembawang Hills
- Coordinates: 1°22′32″N 103°49′52″E
- Country: Singapore
- Planning area: Ang Mo Kio Planning Area

Population (2024)
  - Total: 6,950

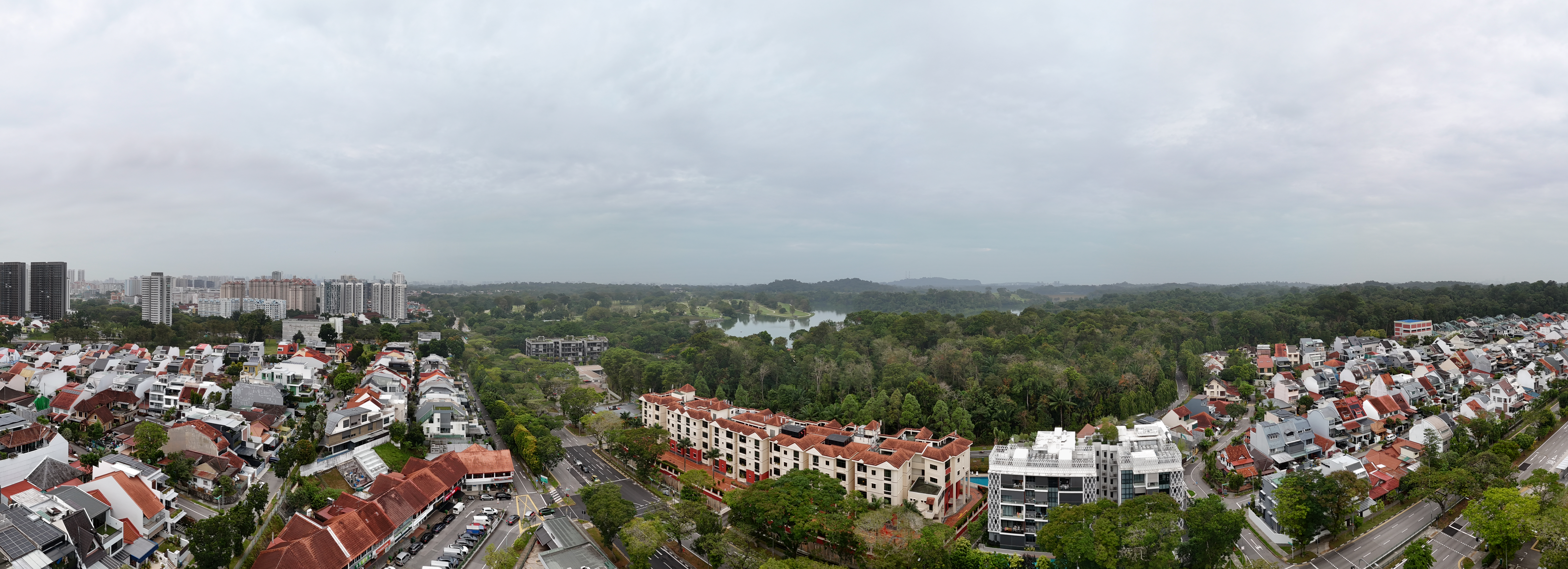
Sembawang Hills facing the central catchment area of Singapore. February 2026.

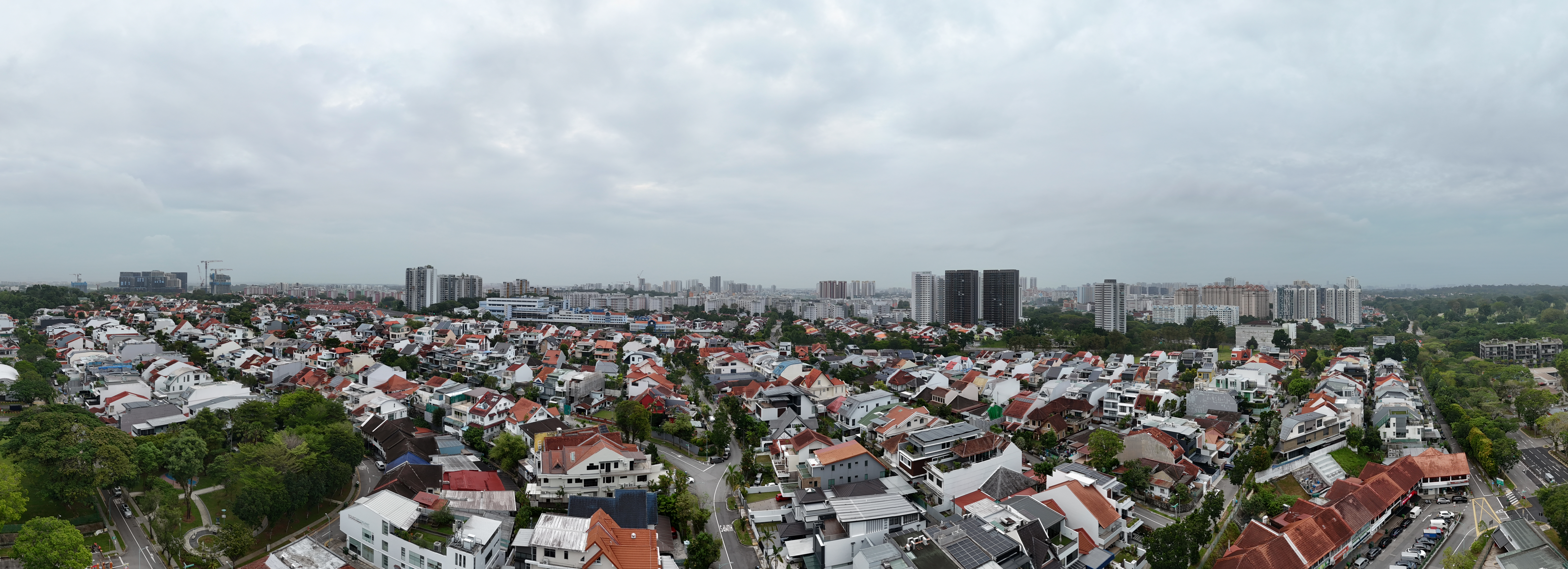
Sembawang Hills looking into Singapore's heartland. February 2026.

Sembawang Hills is a precinct within Ang Mo Kio, Singapore. It is located in the West of Ang Mo Kio and bounded by Tagore, Kebun Baru and Shangri-La districts as well as Bishan - Ang Mo Kio Park.

== Demographics ==
As of 2024, Sembawang Hills has a total population of 6,950 residents, with 3,220 males (46.3%) and 3,730 females (53.7%).

As of 2024, Sembawang Hills had 6,490 residents living in landed properties (93.4%), 390 residents (5.6%) in condominiums and other apartments. There is no HDB in the precinct.

== History ==
The present-day Sembawang Hills area mostly consisted of rubber plantations from 1912 onwards.

In 1954, the landlords of the premises, Bukit Sembawang Rubber Company Limited and Singapore United Rubber Plantations Limited sold plots of rubber plantation to build the first 300 low-cost houses in the precinct.

From 1961 to 1973, the area was within the race circuit for the Thomson Road Grand Prix circuit.

The estate used to host two schools: Sembawang Hills Estate School from 1959 to 1992 and Ahmad Ibrahim Secondary School from 1963 to 1985.

== Residential Area ==
=== Condominium ===
- Peirce View (1996)
- Adana @ Thomson (2018)
- Lattice One (2022)

=== Landed estates ===
- Sembawang Hills Estate (1956)
- Happy Estate (1970)
- Red Brick Villas (1990)
- Happy Park Estate (1993)
- St Nicholas View (2000)
- Horizon Gardens (2002)
- Horizon Green (2004)

== Transportation ==
=== Roads ===
Sembawang Hills precinct is bounded by Ang Mo Kio Avenue 1, Ang Mo Kio Avenue 2, Ang Mo Kio Avenue 5 and Yio Chu Kang Road while Upper Thomson Roard is winding through the precinct.

=== Public Transport ===
Bus services 138, 163, 167, 169, 265, 855, 860 and 980 serve the precinct and connect the residents to Ang Mo Kio, Upper Thomson or Yio Chu Kang MRT stations.

== For the community ==
=== Hawker Centre ===
There is one hawker centre and market in the precinct: Sembawang Hills Food Centre along Upper Thomson Road.

=== Amenities and landmarks ===
- Bishan - Ang Mo Kio Park
- Salem Chapel
- Sembawang Baptist Church
- Upper Thomson Community Hub
