= Anne Parrish =

American writer (1888–1957)

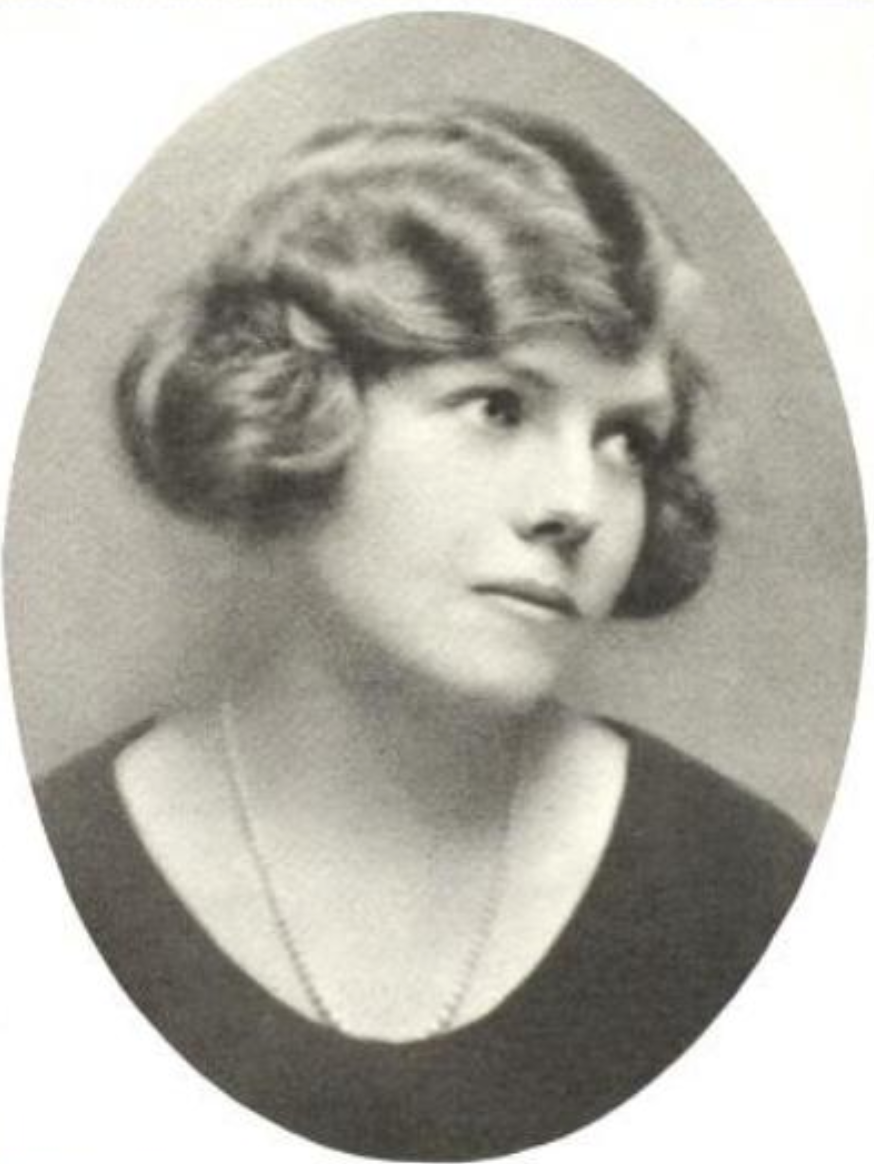
- Parrish from a 1923 publication
- Born: November 12, 1888; Colorado Springs, Colorado, US
- Died: September 5, 1957; Danbury, Connecticut, US
- Occupation: Writer
- Writing career
- Genres: Children's literature, novels
- Notable works: The Dream Coach, Floating Island, The Story of Appleby Capple

Anne Parrish (November 12, 1888 – September 5, 1957) was an American novelist and writer of children's books. She was a runner-up for the Newbery Medal three times from 1925 to 1951.

== Early life ==
Parrish was born November 12, 1888, in Colorado Springs, Colorado, where she attended the Misses Ferris' and San Luis Schools. Her father was Thomas Clarkson Parrish, an etcher from Philadelphia. Her mother, Anne (née Lodge), had studied at the Pennsylvania Academy of Fine Arts, becoming a portrait painter and a friend of Mary Cassatt in Paris. Anne Parrish was the elder sister of the illustrator-writer Dillwyn Parrish and a cousin of the painter Maxfield Parrish. Thomas Parrish was in the Colorado mining business and died in 1899 around age 53.

The rest of her childhood was spent in her family hometown of Claymont, Delaware. She went on to study "painting in Philadelphia, more because my mother and father were painters than because I was one."

== Career ==
Parrish trained at the Philadelphia School of Design for Women as a young woman, and studied under Thomas Eakins. She chose a career in literature, with her first romantic novel Pocketful of Poses appearing in 1923, the same year she published a children's book, with her brother Dillwyn as illustrator. Their collaboration titled Knee-High to a Grasshopper was followed by another book for children in 1924, Lustres.

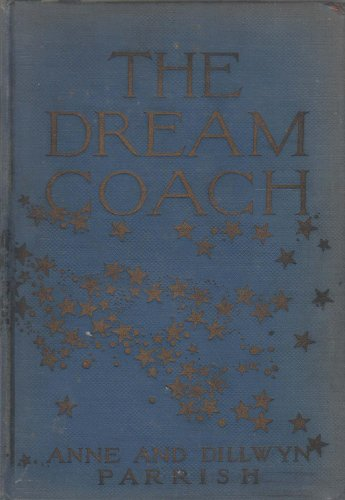
Cover of The Dream Coach

In 1925 she was a runner-up for the Newbery Medal for The Dream Coach, the third collaboration with her brother. That same year, her novel The Perennial Bachelor was the eighth best-selling book for the entire year according to the New York Times and won the Harper Prize from her publisher, Harper & Brothers. An author of stories that mostly featured female protagonists, in 1927, she had another novel make it into the top ten list of bestselling novels in the United States. She repeated on the annual bestsellers list again in 1928 with All Kneeling, that was made into the 1950 film Born to Be Bad, starring Joan Fontaine and Robert Ryan.

Parrish assembled an art collection that included the 1873 Impressionist painting Monet Painting in His Garden at Argenteuil by Pierre-Auguste Renoir, and Vase with Red Poppies by Vincent van Gogh, both of which she bequeathed to the Wadsworth Atheneum museum of art in Hartford, Connecticut.

== Later life ==
In 1915, Parrish married industrialist Charles Albert Corliss, who died in 1936. Two years later, she married the poet and novelist Josiah Titzell (aka Frederick Lambeck). They made their home in Redding, Connecticut. After he died in 1943, she continued to live there for the rest of her life. Parrish died of a cerebral hemorrhage in Danbury, Connecticut, in 1957. She endowed the "Anne Parrish Titzell Professor of Neurology" chair at Cornell University, originally for research and treatment of mental and emotional disorders.

== Bibliography ==
- Pocketful of Poses (1923)
- Knee-High to a Grasshopper (1923), illustrated by Dillwyn Parrish
- Lustres (1924), illus. Dillwyn Parrish
- The Dream Coach (1924), illus. Dillwyn Parrish – Newbery runner-up
- Semi-Attached (1924)
- The Perennial Bachelor (1925)
- Tomorrow Morning (1927)
- All Kneeling (1928)
- The Methodist Faun (1929)
- Floating Island (novel) (1930) – Newbery runner-up
- Loads of Love (1932)
- Sea Level (1934)
- Golden Wedding (1936)
- Mr. Despondency's Daughter (1938)
- Pray for a Tomorrow (1941)
- Poor Child (1945)
- A Clouded Star (1948)
- The Story of Appleby Capple (1950) – Newbery runner-up
- And Have Not Love (1954)
- The Lucky One (1958)
