= Born to Be Bad (1950 film) =

1950 film by Nicholas Ray

- Theatrical release poster
- Directed by: Nicholas Ray
- Screenplay by: Edith Sommer; Charles Schnee (adaptation); Robert Soderberg (additional dialogue); George Oppenheimer (additional dialogue)
- Based on: All Kneeling by Anne Parrish
- Produced by: Robert Sparks
- Starring: Joan Fontaine; Robert Ryan; Zachary Scott; Joan Leslie; Mel Ferrer
- Cinematography: Nicholas Musuraca
- Edited by: Frederic Knudtson
- Music by: Frederick Hollander
- Distributed by: RKO Radio Pictures
- Release dates: September 21, 1950 (Los Angeles); September 28, 1950 (New York)
- Running time: 94 minutes
- Country: United States
- Language: English

Born to Be Bad is a 1950 American film noir melodrama directed by Nicholas Ray and starring Joan Fontaine, Robert Ryan and Zachary Scott. It is based on the bestselling 1928 novel All Kneeling by Anne Parrish. It was released on September 21, 1950.

== Plot ==
Donna Foster works for publisher John Caine. She agrees to have his niece Christabel live with her in San Francisco while Christabel attends business school. Christabel proves to be a scheming, socially ambitious tramp. She flirts with Donna's fiancé, the wealthy Curtis Carey, at a party for Donna's friend, painter Gabriel Broome. She also attracts the interest of aspiring author Nick Bradley.

While having her portrait painted by Broome, a call from Curtis brings Christabel eagerly to a jeweler, only to discover to her disappointment that he merely seeks her advice in buying Donna an engagement gift. After he purchases an expensive item, Christabel plants a seed of doubt in Donna's mind and makes her feel guilty by insinuating that in accepting such a lavish gift from Curtis, Donna will appear that she is just after his money.

Christabel convinces Curtis to propose a prenuptial agreement. As Christabel had planned, Donna is offended by the offer and breaks her engagement with Curtis. With Curtis now available, Christabel rebuffs a marriage proposal from Nick, whose novel is about to be published by Caine.

Christabel and Curtis begin a love affair that culminates in their wedding, which elevates Christabel to high-society status. However, she is still attracted to Nick, which she confesses when she sees him on the evening of the ball. Unable to suppress her feelings for Nick, she secretly leaves a vacation resort for a secret rendezvous. However, she is unwilling to commit fully to Nick, hoping that they can conduct their affair in secret until she can secure Curtis’ fortune. Nick is disgusted by the proposition.

As a cover for her reunion with Nick, Christabel had left a note telling Curtis that she went to visit her aunt Clara. Her lie is exposed by Caine, who informs Curtis that the aunt had died while Christabel claimed to be visiting her. Curtis angrily commands Christabel to leave the premises.

Curtis reunites with Donna after sending Christabel away with nothing more than a few expensive furs. In a brief closing montage, we see Christabel maneuver through two more scam marriages before the end credits.

== Cast ==
- Joan Fontaine as Christabel Caine Carey
- Robert Ryan as Nick Bradley
- Zachary Scott as Curtis Carey
- Joan Leslie as Donna Foster
- Mel Ferrer as Gabriel 'Gobby' Broome
- Harold Vermilyea as John Caine
- Virginia Farmer as Aunt Clara Caine
- Kathleen Howard as Mrs. Bolton
- Bess Flowers as Mrs. Worthington

== Reception ==
In a contemporary review for The New York Times, critic Thomas M. Pryor wrote: "Joan Fontaine is demonstrating how a honey-voiced demon can have her cake and eat it too up to the point where the Production Code cries out for retribution. Unfortunately, and for this the writers of the new R.K.O. production must take most responsibility, Miss Fontaine is not nearly as fascinatingly evil as she is physically attractive in an array of gorgeously tailored gowns. Christabel Caine was intended to be ever so cunningly deceptive—and destructive—but this spectator never managed to subdue the annoying thought that the lady's naivety was too pretentiously displayed. The thought becomes increasingly disturbing because the scenarists keep insisting that her male victims are really bright boys."

Reviewer Edwin Schallert of the Los Angeles Times wrote: "Joan Fontaine presents one of the screen's most insidious and scheming ladies in 'Born to Be Bad,' and makes her amazingly plausible. There are certain obvious tokens to indicate her duplicity, and the film would be just as well off without these. Also it could reach a somewhat more forceful climax than it does. But as a monotone of feminine chicanery this RKO feature, directed by Nicholas Ray, long delayed in reaching the screen, fares rather well." On the review aggregator website Rotten Tomatoes, 71% of 7 critics' reviews are positive.

== In popular culture ==
In 1973, the 13th episode of the seventh season of The Carol Burnett Show featured a parody of the film called "Raised to Be Rotten", with Carol Burnett as "Christinabel" alongside Ruth Buzzi, Richard Crenna and Harvey Korman.
