= Loring Schuler =

Loring Ashley Schuler (August 24, 1886 – June 4, 1968) was an American journalist and editor of the Ladies' Home Journal from 1928 to 1935.

Schuler was born in 1886 and grew up in New Bedford, Massachusetts and graduated from Harvard University in 1912. He started in journalism by reporting for the New Bedford Standard before he was old enough to vote. During college he was an assistant night editor of the Boston Herald. He also worked at the city staff on The New York World. In 1913 he joined The Country Gentleman, starting as assistant editor and later becoming editor. He became editor of the Ladies' Home Journal in 1928, which was also owned by Curtis Publishing Company, of which he become a director. According to his New York Times obituary, as editor, "he was said to have clarified for his readers social and economic problems of the Depression. After leaving the Journal in 1935, he later contributed to national magazines and worked in public relations.

Schuler died in Greenwich, Connecticut on June 4, 1968, at the age of 81. He wife had died in 1967, and he was survived by two sons.
