= Consider the Oyster =

1941 book by M. F. K. Fisher

- Author: M. F. K. Fisher
- Language: English
- Publication date: 1941
- Media type: Print
- ISBN: 0-86547-335-8

Consider the Oyster is a book by M. F. K. Fisher that deals in the history, preparation and eating of oysters. The work was first published in the United States in 1941.

The 2004 essay "Consider the Lobster" by David Foster Wallace (republished in his 2005 essay collection of the same name) is named for Consider the Oyster.
