= Chwee kueh =

Chinese steamed rice cake

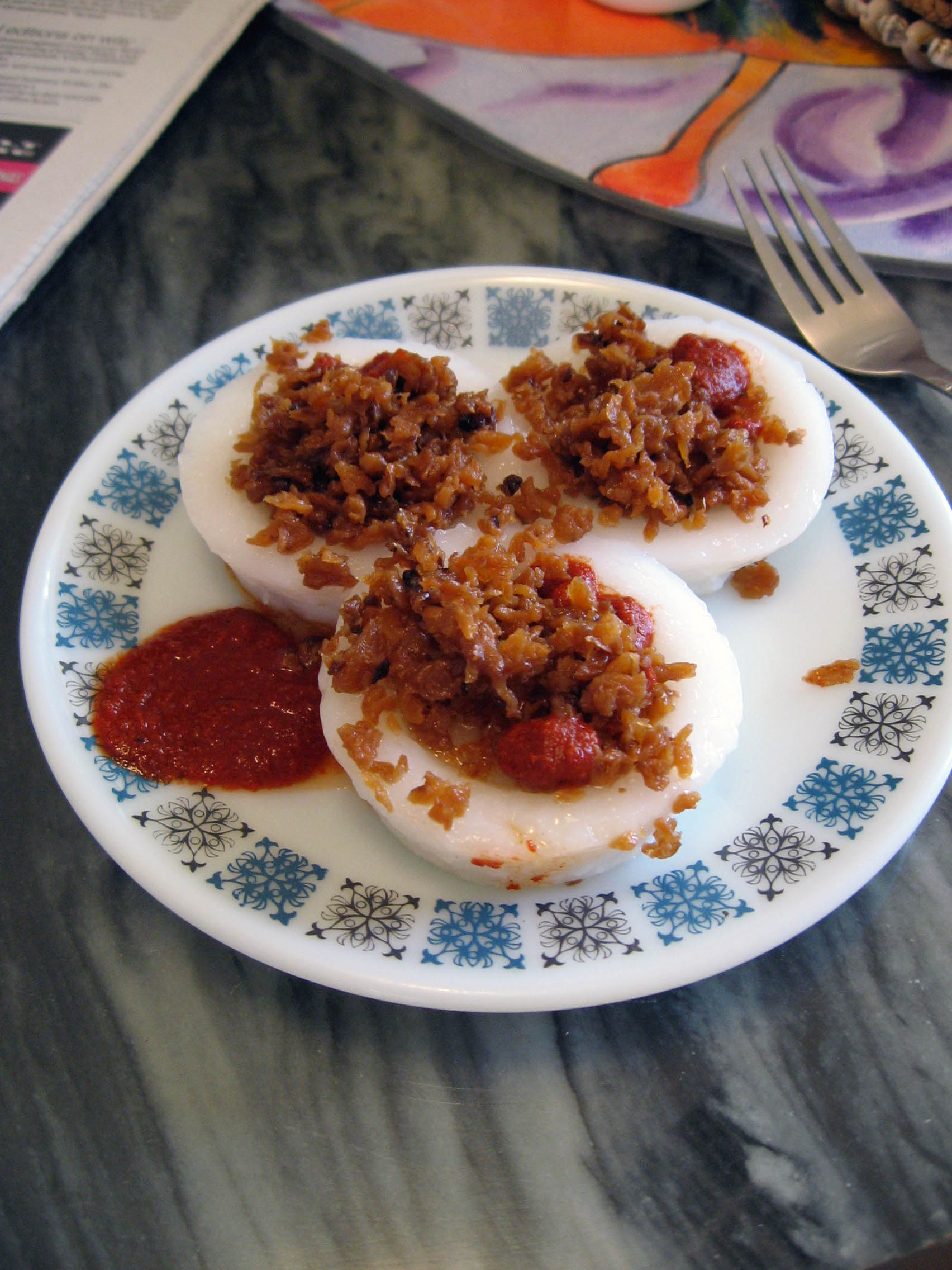
- Chwee kueh (zwee gway) served in Singapore, with hot preserved radish relish
- Place of origin: China
- Region or state: Chaoshan, Guangdong; Southeast Asia
- Associated cuisine: Teochew cuisine, Malaysian Chinese cuisine and Singaporean cuisine
- Created by: Teochews
- Main ingredients: rice flour; preserved radish

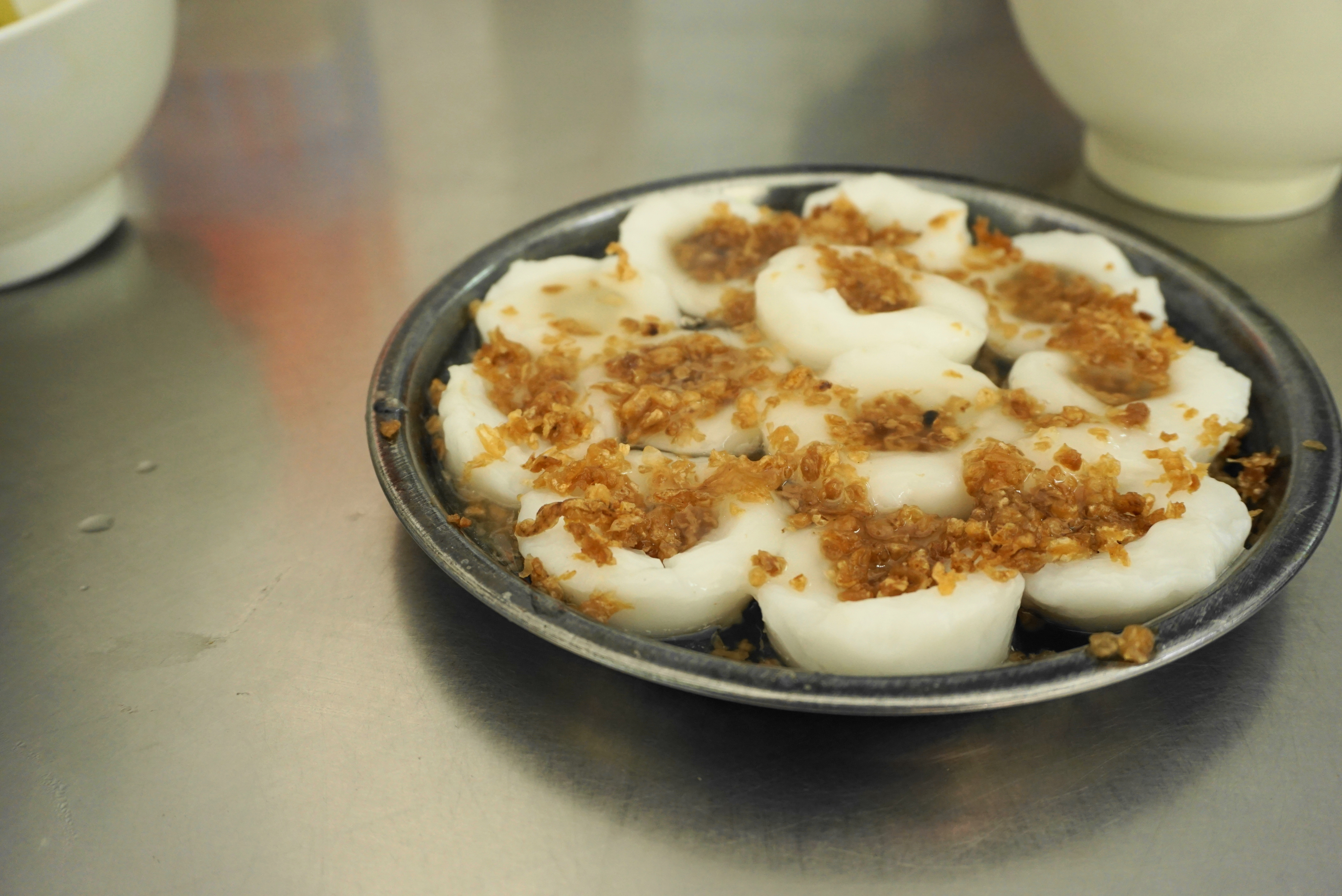
Chwee kueh in Shantou, a city in Guangdong, the historical homeland of the Teochews

Chwee kueh (Chinese: 水粿; pinyin: shuǐguǒ; Pe̍h-ōe-jī: chúi-kóe; lit. 'water rice cake'), also spelt chwee kweh, is a steamed rice cake originating in Teochew cuisine. The dish was brought by Teochew migrants to Southeast Asia and became established particularly in Malaysia and Singapore, where regional preparations developed.

It is made from a mixture of rice flour and water steamed in small moulds. In Malaysia and Singapore, it is commonly served with preserved radish and chilli sauce and is eaten as a breakfast food or snack.

In Singapore, chwee kueh became a widely available hawker-centre breakfast dish, and the local preparation is commonly associated with Singaporean cuisine.

== History ==
During the 19th century, many Teochew people moved to Singapore, bringing their culinary expertise with them. Today, chwee kueh is a popular breakfast item in Singapore, served in many of its hawker centres and it is commonly associated with Singaporean cuisine.

To make chwee kueh, rice flour and water are mixed together to form a slightly viscous mixture. The mixture is then poured into small saucer-like aluminium cups and steamed, forming a characteristic bowl-like shape when cooked. The rice cakes are almost tasteless on their own, but are topped with diced preserved radish and served with chilli sauce.

== See also ==
- Idli
- List of steamed foods
- Rice cake
- Water pie
