= Floating Island (novel) =

Book by Anne Parrish

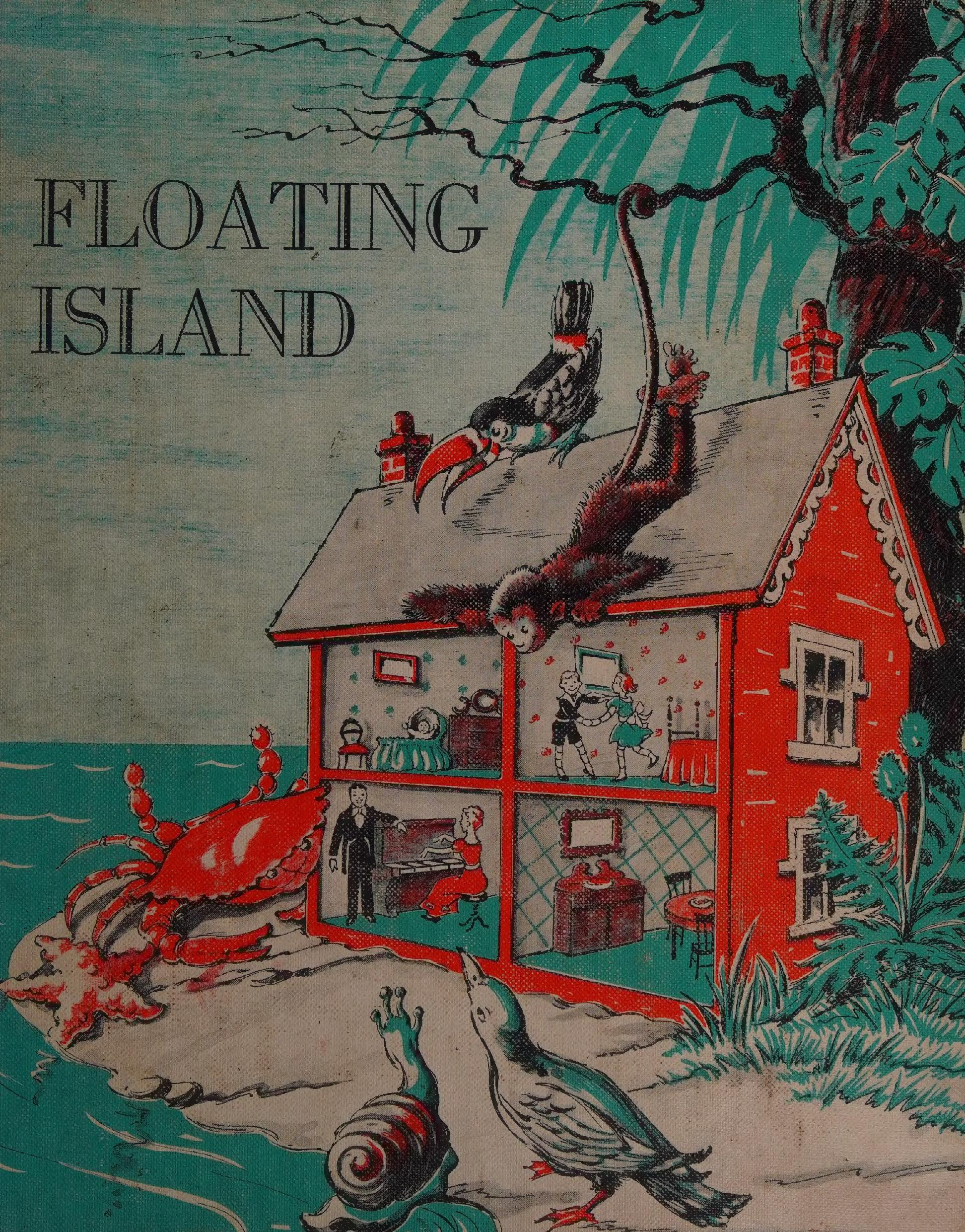
- Author: Anne Parrish
- Illustrator: Anne Parrish
- Language: English
- Genre: Children's literature
- Published: 1930
- Publisher: Harper & Brothers
- Publication place: USA
- Media type: Print (hardback)
- Pages: 265
- OCLC: 1654627

Floating Island is a 1930 children's novel written and illustrated by Anne Parrish. A China-doll family's shipwreck and adventure in the Floating Island are told in the novel in the simple and colloquial style.

== Story ==
A China-Doll family happily lives in a dollhouse at a toy shop reading books and dancing "The Waltz of the Dolls" with the piano accompaniment of Mrs. Doll.

One day, Henry purchases the dollhouse and the dolls for his niece, Elizabeth, and the dolls are wrapped, put inside a box, and sent to the tropics, where Elizabeth lives. En route, the dolls wreck on a ship, and they drift to an uninhabited tropical island with their dollhouse. They gradually adapt to the island and become familiar with the native animals.

At the end of the story, Mrs. Doll proposes leaving Floating Island, because "dolls need children, and children need dolls". They raise a signal fire, which is spotted by a sailor.

The story concludes by asking readers whether or not they have the doll and "If you think they are, will you tell me?"

== Characters ==
- Mr. Doll: A fatherly doll with the shining black china hair.
- Mrs. Doll: A motherly doll with the fuzzy and yellow hair.
- William Doll: A boy doll with the brown china hair.
- Annabel Doll: A girl doll with the long yellow hair and a white dress.
- Baby Doll
- Dinah the Cook: A housemaid of Doll family. Her china is black and lips seem full. At the end, unlike the other dolls she chooses to stay on Floating Island because she feels "as if this [island] was home".
- Finny, Lobby, Chicky and Pudding: Plaster friends of the family.
- Sailor Joe: A sailor who found the doll house and dolls on the Floating Island. No one on the ship Shooting Star believes what he saw in the Island.

== Reception ==
The Horn Book Magazine described Floating Island as "... one of those books so whimsically compounded that its like happens rarely." and went on "There are many people who can write a fine story of adventure, history or everyday life, but how many can write an Alice or a Story of Dr. Dolittle? It is this last kind of book which Anne Parrish has made."

== Awards ==
- 1931 Newbery Honor
