= Ghost Town, Oakland, California =

Human settlement in Oakland, California, United States of America

Coordinates: 37.82295°N 122.27146°W

Ghost Town (sometimes spelled Ghosttown) is the informal name of the Hoover-Foster Historic District neighborhood in West Oakland, Oakland, California.

== History ==
Ranked fifteenth on Time Out's coolest neighborhoods in the world list in 2020, the community is known for its violence and blight. Some people believe the name originates from a drug kingpin who referred to the area as a ghost town due to the shortage of other drug dealers whose absence was attributed to the kingpin's dominance over the area. Others believe it derives from the two former casket companies located side by side on Filbert Street between 30th and 32nd Streets. Ghost Town stretches from 27th Street to 35th Street in the area immediately southwest of the MacArthur Maze. Others see the neighborhood bounded by Adeline on the West and San Pablo on the East. Ghost Town Farms, one of the more successful expressions of urban agriculture activity in Oakland is located in the heart of the district at 2727 Martin Luther King Jr. Way, between 27th and 28th Streets. The area is also one of Oakland's open-air art galleries, with many murals, particularly along Martin Luther King Jr. Way. This neighborhood has an active citizen crime patrol, including one group of seniors who walk the neighborhood weekly to get physical exercise and report blight. Jerry Brown, governor of California and former Mayor of Oakland stated: "Instead of an omnibus crime bill, you have to deal with shootings in Ghost Town in West Oakland and sideshows in East Oakland." Brown made attempts to turn around the blighted West Oakland neighborhood after 60 Minutes featured it in a television profile. Housing prices have increased. So has drug dealing, especially since nearby parks were closed by the City of Oakland. By 2015, prostitution had been on the decline for at least a decade.

The term "ghost riding" has been attributed to this Oakland neighborhood. According to the Contra Costa Times and The Washington Post, local rapper Mistah F.A.B. popularized the term with his song "Ghost Ride It" and speculated that its origins are in Ghost Town.

== City-County Neighborhood Initiative ==
Both the Hoover-Foster Historic District (Ghosttown) and Sobrante Park, were targeted for youth intervention programs by the city of Oakland in their "Measure Y" campaigns. The specific program is termed by the city the "City-County Neighborhood Initiative". Its strategy, according to the Human Services Department, is "based on best practices, has community builders going door-to-door to support and encourage neighbors to address their issues (e.g., typically truant youth, blight, and loitering) and help them ultimately to organize (e.g., Friends of Durant Park, West Oakland Mini-Grant Committee, Resident Action Council, Block captains, neighborhood watches, Home Alert, Renters or Home Owners' Associations) and take ownership of their communities. This strategy is based on the theory that violence must be addressed in the context of the community in which it occurs."

== See also ==
- Ghost Town Royals
