= Dillwyn Parrish =

American writer and painter (1894–1941)

- Born: George Dillwyn Parrish; July 25, 1894; Colorado Springs, Colorado, U.S.
- Died: August 6, 1941 (aged 47) near Hemet, California, U.S.
- Education: Harvard University
- Spouses: Gigi Parrish (m. 1928; div. 1936) M. F. K. Fisher (m. 1938)
- Relatives: Anne Parrish (sister); Maxfield Parrish (cousin)
- Military career
- Branch: United States Army
- Conflicts: World War I

George Dillwyn Parrish (July 25, 1894 – August 6, 1941) was an American writer, illustrator, and painter.

== Early life and education ==
Born in Colorado Springs, Colorado, Parrish was usually known by his middle name "Dillwyn", or "Tim" or "Timmy" by those close to him. He was the son of Thomas Parrish, who came from an artistic Philadelphia family, and Anne Lodge, who had studied at the Pennsylvania Academy of Fine Arts, becoming a respected portrait painter, and becoming a friend of Mary Cassatt in Paris. Dillwyn Parrish was the younger brother of author Anne Parrish; they were cousins to the artist Maxfield Parrish who used them as models in some of his paintings. Dillwyn's father Thomas gained success in the Colorado mining business but died when Dillwyn was relatively young. His mother moved the family back to her hometown of Claymont, Delaware.

Dillwyn Parrish studied art in Philadelphia, then attended Harvard University, where he made the acquaintance of Conrad Aiken and E. E. Cummings. During World War I, he volunteered to drive ambulances for the American Field Service in France, but after being diagnosed with severe malnutrition he was sent back to the U.S. to recover. A year later he was drafted into the United States Army and served in a military hospital. While still in his twenties, medical problems began to plague him, exacerbated by the fact that he was a heavy cigarette smoker.

== Career ==
In 1923, Dillwyn Parrish did the illustrations for a 209-page children's novel written by his sister Anne, Knee-High to a Grasshopper. They followed this publication with two more books for children, publishing Lustres in 1924 and then earning a Newbery Honor in 1925 for their third collaboration, The Dream Coach. On a trip to Switzerland the two purchased "Le Paquis," a cottage in a meadow overlooking Lake Geneva not far from Lausanne between Vevey and Chexbres.

For a time, Dillwyn Parrish tutored the children of a wealthy family, and began a relationship with Gigi Parrish, the family's youngest girl. In 1926, Harper & Bros published his novel Smith Everlasting, and between then and 1934 three more of his books came out. In 1927, at age thirty, he married the fifteen-year-old "Gigi", and for their honeymoon the couple started out on motorcycles from his home in Claymont, Delaware, intending to drive across the country to California. However, his new bride was severely injured in an accident in the Southwestern United States and, once she was able to travel, they completed the remainder of the journey via train. In 1929, they moved permanently to California, where a few years later, Gigi was signed to a contract with Samuel Goldwyn's motion picture company and in 1934 she became one of the WAMPAS Baby Stars.

Dillwyn and Gigi Parrish rented a beach house in Laguna Beach, next door to Mary Frances Kennedy Fisher and her husband Alfred Fisher. Dillwyn Parrish fell in love with Mary Fisher, and after encouraging her writing, helped get her culinary essays published in 1937 under the title Serve it Forth. Their relationship came at a point when his marriage was already in difficulty, and eventually both couples divorced. He married Mary Fisher in 1938 and next year Harper published their co-written novel Touch and Go under the pseudonym of Victoria Berne. They lived at Le Paquis in Switzerland until 1939, when war broke out again in Europe. In January 1940, they bought land with a pinewood cabin in the San Jacinto Mountains near Hemet, California.

== Personal life ==
Parrish suffered from Buerger's disease, which resulted in the amputation of a leg. During this time, he returned to painting, creating a series of works dominated by images of angels of death that formed part of an exhibition organized by the University of California, Los Angeles.

His health rapidly deteriorated, and he lived in constant pain. Faced with the necessity of further limb amputations, on August 6, 1941, he shot himself in the countryside near his home in the San Jacinto Mountains. He was cremated, his ashes buried under an overhanging rock on the mountain rim overlooking their home. He was 47 years old.

Parrish's death impelled his widow into writing more books, mostly culinary. Stay Me, Oh Comfort Me: Journals and Stories 1933–1941 (1993) recounted her time with Dillwyn Parrish.

== Works ==
- Knee-High to a Grasshopper, written by Anne Parrish (Macmillan, 1923)
- Lustres, wr. Anne Parrish (New York: George Doran, 1924), collection, OCLC 13510924
- The Dream Coach, wr. Anne Parrish (Macmillan, 1924), collection of original fairy tales, OCLC 20953182
- Smith Everlasting (1926)
- Gray Sheep (1927)
- Praise the Lord! (1932)
- Hung for a Song: a novel of the lives and adventures of Major Stede Bonnet and Blackbeard the pirate (1934), illustrated by Richard Floethe
- Touch and Go (Harper & Bros., 1939), by "Victoria Berne", the joint pseudonym of Parrish and M.F.K. Fisher
