= M. F. K. Fisher =

American food writer (1908–1992)

- Born: Mary Frances Kennedy; July 3, 1908; Albion, Michigan, U.S.
- Died: June 22, 1992 (aged 83); Glen Ellen, California, U.S.
- Occupation: Writer
- Spouse(s): Alfred Young Fisher; Dillwyn Parrish; Donald Friede
- Children: Anna, Kennedy
- Writing career
- Pen name: Victoria Berne (shared)
- Subjects: Food, travel, memoir

Mary Frances Kennedy Fisher Parrish Friede (July 3, 1908 – June 22, 1992), writing as M.F.K. Fisher, was an American food writer. She was a founder of the Napa Valley Wine Library. Over her lifetime she wrote 27 books, among them Consider the Oyster (1941), How to Cook a Wolf (1942), The Gastronomical Me (1943) and a translation of Brillat-Savarin's The Physiology of Taste. Fisher believed that eating well was just one of the "arts of life" and explored this in her writing. W. H. Auden once remarked, "I do not know of anyone in the United States who writes better prose." In 1991 the New York Times editorial board went so far as to say, "Calling M.F.K. Fisher, who has just been elected to the American Academy and National Institute of Arts and Letters, a food writer is a lot like calling Wolfgang Amadeus Mozart a tunesmith. At the same time that she is celebrating, say, oysters (which lead, she says, 'a dreadful but exciting life') or the scent of orange segments drying on a radiator, she is also celebrating life and loneliness, sense and sensibility."

== Early life ==
Fisher was born Mary Frances Kennedy on July 3, 1908, at 202 Irwin Avenue, Albion, Michigan. She told Albion City Historian Frank Passic:

I… was delivered at home by "Doc" George Hafford, a man my parents Rex and Edith Kennedy were devoted to. Rex was then one of the volunteer firemen, and since I was born in a heatwave, he persuaded his pals to come several times and spray the walls of the house. My father Rex was sure I would be born on July 4, and he wanted to name me Independencia. My mother Edith was firmly against this completely un-Irish notion, and induced Doc Hafford to hurry things up a bit, in common pity.

Rex was a co-owner (with his brother Walter) and editor of the Albion Evening Recorder newspaper.

In 1911, Rex sold his interest in the paper to his brother, and moved the family to the West Coast, where he hoped to buy a fruit or citrus orchard. The family spent some time in Washington with relatives, and then traveled down the coast to Ventura, California, where Rex nearly purchased an orange grove, but backed out after discovering soil problems. He next purchased and briefly owned the Oxnard Courier in Oxnard, California. From there he traveled to San Diego and worked for a local newspaper. In 1912 he purchased a controlling interest in the Whittier News and moved the family to Whittier, California. Rex initially purchased a house at 115 Painter Avenue. In 1919, he purchased a large white house outside the city limits on South Painter Avenue. The house sat on thirteen acres, with an orange grove; it was referred to by the family as "The Ranch." Although Whittier was primarily a Quaker community at that time, Mary Frances was brought up within the Episcopal Church.

Mary Frances enjoyed reading as a child, and began writing poetry at the age of five. The Kennedys had a vast home library, and her mother provided her access to many other books. Later, her father used her as stringer on his paper, and she would draft as many as fifteen stories a day.

Mary Frances received a formal education; however, she was an indifferent student who often skipped classes throughout her academic career. At the age of sixteen, her parents enrolled her in a private school: The Bishop's School in La Jolla, California. After one year there, she transferred to the Harker School for Girls in Palo Alto, California, adjacent to Stanford University; she graduated from Harker in 1927. Upon graduation, she attended Illinois College, but left after only one semester, In 1928, she enrolled in summer school at UCLA in order to obtain enough credits to transfer to Occidental College. While there, she met her future first husband: Alfred Fisher ("Al"). She attended Occidental College for one year; however, she married Al on September 5, 1929, and moved with him to Dijon, France.

== Career ==
Food became an early passion in her life. Her earliest memory of taste was "the grayish-pink fuzz my grandmother skimmed from a spitting kettle of strawberry jam". Her maternal grandmother Holbrook lived with them until her death in 1920. During that period, Holbrook was a source of tension in the household. She was a stern, rather joyless person, and a Campbellite who firmly believed in overcooked, bland food. She was also a follower of Dr. John Harvey Kellogg's dietary restrictions at the Battle Creek Sanitarium. Fisher would later write that during her grandmother's absences at religious conventions:

[W]e indulged in a voluptuous riot of things like marshmallows in hot chocolate, thin pastry under the Tuesday hash, rare roast beef on Sunday instead of boiled hen. Mother ate all she wanted of cream of fresh mushroom soup; Father served a local wine, red-ink he called it, with the steak; we ate grilled sweetbreads and skewered kidneys with a daring dash of sherry on them.

An early food influence was "Aunt" Gwen. Aunt Gwen was not family, but the daughter of friends — the Nettleship family — "a strange family of English medical missionaries who preferred tents to houses." The Nettleships had an encampment on Laguna Beach, and Mary Frances would camp out there with Gwen. Rex would later buy the campsite and a cabin that had been built on it. Mary Frances recalled cooking outdoors with Gwen: steaming mussels on fresh seaweed over hot coals; catching and frying rock bass; skinning and cooking eel; and, making fried egg sandwiches to carry on hikes. Mary Frances wrote of her meals with Gwen and Gwen's brothers: "I decided at the age of nine that one of the best ways to grow up is to eat and talk quietly with good people." Mary Frances liked to cook meals in the kitchen at home, and "easily fell into the role of the cook's helper."

=== Dijon ===
In September 1929, newlyweds Mary Frances and Al sailed on the RMS Berengaria to Cherbourg (now Cherbourg-Octeville), France. They traveled to Paris for a brief stay, before continuing south to Dijon. They initially found a rental at 14 Rue du Petit-Potet in a home owned by the Ollangnier family. The lodgings consisted of two rooms, with no kitchen, and no separate bathroom. Al attended the Faculté des Lettres at the University of Dijon where he was working on his doctorate; when not in class, he worked on his epic poem, The Ghosts in the Underblows. The poem was based on the Bible and was analogous to James Joyce's Ulysses. By 1931, Fisher had finished the first twelve books of the poem, which he ultimately expected to contain sixty books. Mary Frances attended night classes at the École des Beaux-Arts where she spent three years studying painting and sculpture. The Ollangniers served good food at home, although Madame Ollangnier was "extremely penurious and stingy." Mary Frances remembered big salads made at the table, deep-fried Jerusalem artichokes, and "reject cheese" that was always good. To celebrate their three-month anniversary, Al and Mary Frances went to the Aux Trois Faisans restaurant — their first of many visits. There, Mary Frances received her education in fine wine from a sommelier named Charles. The Fishers visited all the restaurants in town, where in Mary Frances's words:

We ate terrines of pate ten years old under their tight crusts of mildewed fat. We tied napkins under our chins and splashed in great odorous bowls of ecrevisses a la nage. We addled our palates with snipes hung so long they fell from their hooks, to be roasted then on cushions of toast softened with the paste of their rotted innards and fine brandy.

In 1930, Lawrence Clark Powell came to Dijon to obtain his doctorate at the University of Burgundy. He came at Mary Frances's suggestion. Powell had become acquainted with Mary Frances when her sister was attending Occidental College, and roomed with Powell's girlfriend. Powell moved into the attic above the Fishers and became lifelong friends with Mary Frances. He described the food at the Fishers' pensione:

Oh my god, how was the food? Jim it was heavenly! Madame Rigoulet [Ollangnier's successor] ... was a great cook, and her husband was a great cook of omelets so he always did the omelet. And the food just floated through the air. You reached up in the air and drew it down — marvelous food.

In 1931, Mary Frances and Al moved to their own apartment, above a pastry shop at 26 Rue Monge. It was Mary Frances's first kitchen. It was only five feet by three feet and contained a two-burner hotplate. Despite the kitchen's limitations, or perhaps because of it, Mary Frances began developing her own personal cuisine, with the goal of "cooking meals that would 'shake [her guests] from their routines, not only of meat-potatoes-gravy, but of thought, of behavior.'" In The Gastronomical Me she describes one such meal:

There in Dijon, the cauliflowers were very small and succulent, grown in that ancient soil. I separated the flowerlets and dropped them in boiling water for just a few minutes. Then I drained them and put them in a wide shallow casserole, and covered them with heavy cream, and a thick sprinkling of freshly grated Gruyere, the nice rubbery kind that didn't come from Switzerland at all, but from the Jura. It was called râpé in the market, and was grated while you watched, in a soft cloudy pile, onto your piece of paper.

After Al was awarded his doctorate, they moved briefly to Strasbourg, France, where Al continued to study and write. Mary Frances became depressed from loneliness and being cooped up in a cold, dank apartment. Unable to afford better accommodations, the Fishers next moved to a tiny French fishing village, Le Cros-de-Cagnes. Powell visited with them there for six weeks and observed that Al was growing more introspective. He had stopped work on his poem, was trying to write novels and did not want to return to the States where he knew job prospects were poor. He could not, however, see a way to stay in France. After running out of funds, the Fishers returned to California, sailing on the Feltre out of Marseille.

=== California ===
Back in California, Al and Mary Frances initially moved in with Mary Frances's family at "The Ranch". They later moved into the Laguna cabin. This was during the Great Depression and work was hard to find. Al spent two years looking for a teaching position until he found one at Occidental College. Mary Frances began writing and she published her first piece — "Pacific Village" — in the February 1935 issue of Westways magazine (previously known as Touring Topics). The article was a fictional account of life in Laguna Beach. In 1934, Lawrence Powell moved to Laguna with his wife Fay. In 1933, Dillwyn Parrish and his wife Gigi moved next door to them, and they rapidly became friends.

When Al began teaching at Occidental, the Fishers initially moved to Eagle Rock, Los Angeles, where the Parrishes helped them paint and fix up an older house they had rented. Unfortunately the home was sold shortly thereafter, and the Fishers had to move to another rented house in Highland Park. Mary Frances worked part-time in a card shop and researched old cookery books at the Los Angeles Public Library. She began writing short pieces on gastronomy. Parrish's sister Anne showed them to her publisher at Harpers who expressed an interest in them. The pieces were later to become her first book: Serve It Forth. Mary Frances next began work on a novel she never finished; it was based on the founding of Whittier.

During this period, Mary Frances's marriage with Al was beginning to fail. After Parrish divorced Gigi in 1934, Mary Frances found herself falling in love with him. In Mary's words, she one day sat next to Parrish at the piano and told him she loved him. Mary Frances's biographer Joan Reardon, however, interviewed Gigi who told a different story. She stated that Parrish told her that one night after he had dined alone with Mary Frances, she later let herself into his house and slipped into bed with him. In 1935, with Al's permission, Mary Frances traveled to Europe with Parrish and his mother. The Parrishes had money, and they sailed on the luxury liner Hansa. While in Europe, they spent four days in Paris, and traveled through Provence, Languedoc, and the French Riviera. Mary Frances also revisited Dijon and ate with Parrish at Aux Trois Faisans where she was recognized and served by her old friend, the waiter Charles. She later wrote a piece on their visit — "The Standing and the Waiting" — which was to become the centerpiece of Serve It Forth. Upon her return from Europe, Mary Frances informed Al of her developing relationship with Parrish. In 1936, Dillwyn invited the Fishers to join him in creating an artists' colony at Le Paquis — a two-story stone house that Parrish had bought with his sister north of Vevey, Switzerland. Notwithstanding the clear threat to his marriage, Al agreed.

=== Vevey ===
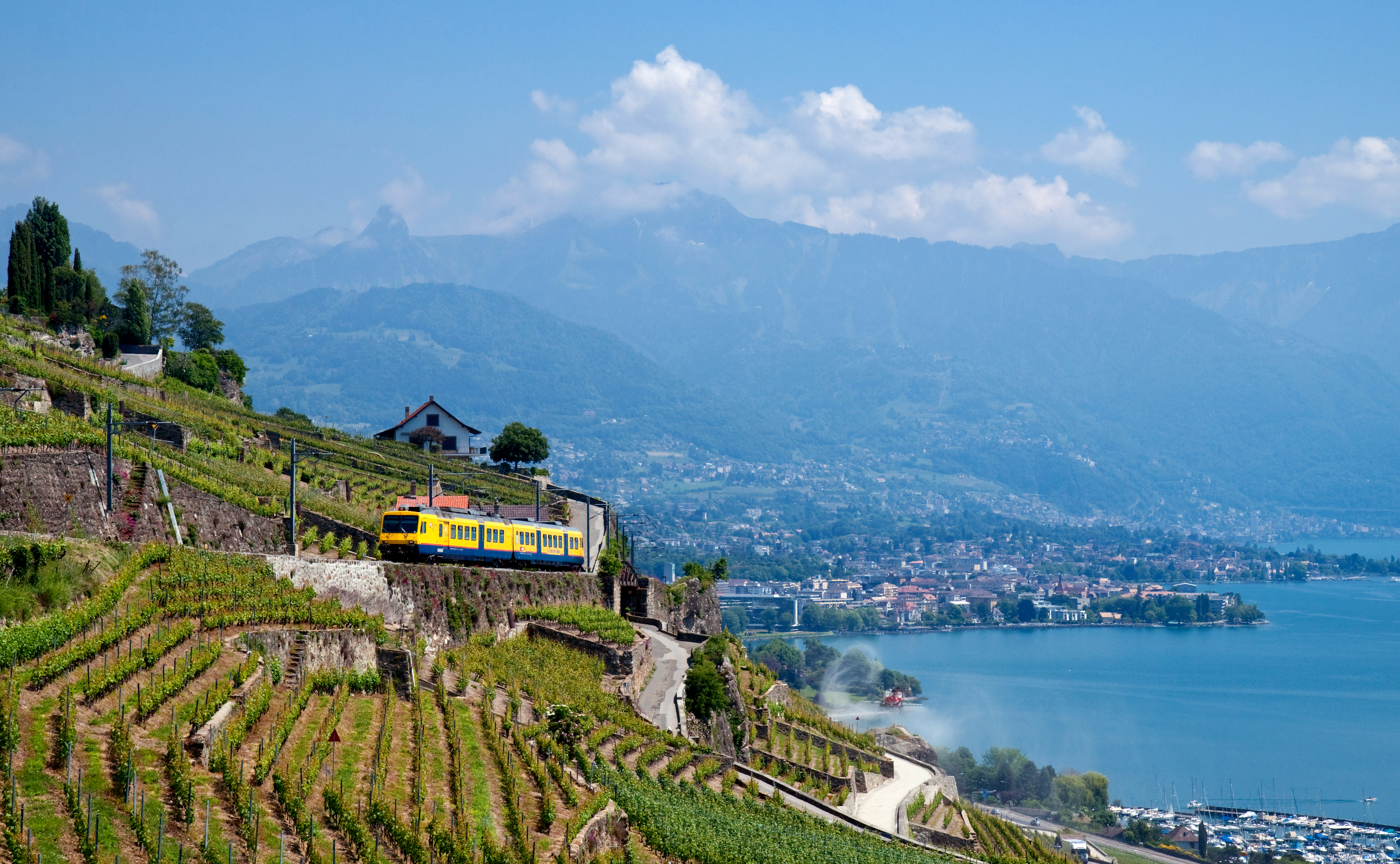
View from Chexbres toward Vevey

The Fishers sailed to Holland on a small Dutch passenger freighter, and from there took a train to Vevey. "Le Paquis" means the grazing ground. The house sat on a sloping meadow on the north shore of Lake Geneva, looking across to the snowcapped Alps. They had a large garden in which

We grew beautiful salads, a dozen different kinds, and several herbs. There were shallots and onion and garlic, and I braided them into long silky ropes and hung them over rafters in the attic.

In mid-1937 Al and Mary Frances separated. He traveled to Austria and then returned to the States where he began a distinguished career as a teacher and poet at Smith College. In a December 2, 1938, letter to Powell, Mary Frances explained her side of the marital breakup. She stated that Al was afraid of physical love; he was sexually impotent in their marriage. Moreover, he was an intellectual loner who was emotionally estranged from Mary Frances. Mary Frances stated that contrary to Al's belief, she had not left him for another man; she had left him because he could not satisfy her emotional and physical needs. In 1938, Mary Frances returned home briefly to inform her parents in person of her separation and pending divorce from Al.

Meanwhile, her first book, Serve It Forth, had opened to largely glowing reviews, including reviews in Harper's Monthly, The New York Times and the Chicago Tribune. Fisher, however, was disappointed in the book's meager sales because she needed the money. During this same period, Fisher and Parrish also co-wrote (alternating chapters) a light romance entitled Touch and Go under the pseudonym Victoria Berne. The book was published by Harper and Brothers in 1939.

In September 1938, Fisher and Parrish could no longer afford to live at Les Paquis and they moved to Bern. After only two days in Bern, however, Parrish suffered severe cramping in his left leg. Hospitalized, he underwent two surgeries to remove clots. Gangrene then set in and his left leg had to be amputated. Parrish was in considerable pain and could not get a good diagnosis from his doctors. With the onset of World War II, and Parrish's need for medical care, Fisher and Parrish returned to the States, where he saw a number of doctors. He ultimately was diagnosed as having Buerger's disease (Thromboangiitis obliterans) — a circulatory system malady that causes extreme thrombosis of the arteries and veins, causing severe pain, and often necessitating multiple amputations. The disease is progressive and there was (and is) no known successful treatment. They returned briefly to Switzerland to close down their apartment, and returned to California. They also needed to accumulate a stock of the painkiller Analgeticum, the only one that Parrish found efficacious, unavailable in the States.

=== California and Provence ===
Once in California, Fisher searched for a warm dry climate that would be beneficial for Parrish's health. She found a small cabin on ninety acres of land south of Hemet, California. They bought the property and named it "Bareacres" after the character Lord Bareacres in Vanity Fair by Thackeray. Lord Bareacres was land-poor; his only asset was his estate. Fisher wrote Powell: "God help us ... We've put our last penny into 90 acres of rocks and rattlesnakes." Although Parrish's life at Bareacres had its ups and downs, its course was a downward spiral. He continued to paint, and Powell staged an exhibition of his works. Fisher was always trying to find ways to obtain Analgeticum; she even wrote President Roosevelt at one point to urge him to lift the import restriction on the drug. Ultimately, Parrish could no longer tolerate the pain and the probable need for additional amputations. On the morning of August 6, 1941, Fisher was awakened by a gunshot. Venturing outside, she discovered that Parrish had committed suicide. Fisher later would write, "I have never understood some (a lot of) taboos and it seems silly to me to make suicide one of them in our social life."

During the period leading up to Tim's death (Parrish was often called "Tim" by family and friends, but referred to as "Chexbres" in Fisher's autobiographical books), Fisher completed three books. The first was a novel entitled The Theoretical Foot. It was a fictional account of expatriates enjoying a summer romp when the protagonist, suffering great pain, ends up losing a leg. Transparently based on Tim, the novel was rejected by publishers. The second book was an unsuccessful attempt by her to revise a novel written by Tim, Daniel Among the Women. Third, she completed and published Consider the Oyster, which she dedicated to Tim. The book was humorous and informative. It contained numerous recipes incorporating oysters, mixed with musings on the history of the oyster, oyster cuisine, and the love life of the oyster.

In 1942, Fisher published How to Cook a Wolf. The book was published at the height of WWII food shortages. "Pages offered housewives advice on how to achieve a balanced diet, stretch ingredients, eat during blackouts, deal with sleeplessness and sorrow, and care for pets during wartime." The book received good reviews and attained literary success, leading to a feature article on Fisher in Look magazine in July 1942.

In May 1942 Fisher began working in Hollywood for Paramount Studios. While there she wrote gags for Bob Hope, Bing Crosby, and Dorothy Lamour. Fisher became pregnant in 1943, and secluded herself in a boarding house in Altadena. While there she worked on the book that would become The Gastronomical Me. On August 15, 1943, she gave birth to Anne Kennedy Parrish (later known as Anna). Fisher listed a fictional father on the birth certificate, Michael Parrish. Fisher initially claimed she had adopted the baby; she never revealed the father's identity.

In 1944, Fisher broke her contract with Paramount. On a trip to New York, she met and fell in love with publisher Donald Friede. In a letter to Powell she wrote, "I accidentally got married to Donald Friede." She spent the summer in Greenwich Village with Friede, working on the book that would become Let Us Feast. Her relationship with Friede gave her entree to additional publishing markets, and she wrote articles for Atlantic Monthly, Vogue, Town and Country, Today's Woman and Gourmet. In fall 1945, Friede's publishing entity failed, and Fisher and Friede returned to Bareacres, both to write. On March 12, 1946, Fisher gave birth to her second daughter, Kennedy Mary Friede. Fisher began work on With Bold Knife and Fork.

Mary Frances's mother died in 1948. In 1949, she moved to the Ranch to take care of her father, Rex. On Christmas Eve 1949, the limited edition release of her translation of Savarin's The Physiology of Taste received rave reviews. "Craig Claiborne of the New York Times said Fisher's prose perfectly captured the wit and gaiety of the book and lauded the hundreds of marginal glosses that [she] added to elucidate the text." During this period, Fisher also was working on a biography of Madame Récamier for which she had received an advance. Her marriage with Donald was starting to unravel. He became ill with intestinal pains and after considerable medical treatment, it became apparent that the pain was psychosomatic, and Donald began receiving psychiatric care. Fisher in turn had been under considerable stress. She had been caretaker for Tim, had weathered his suicide, suffered her brother's suicide a year later, followed by the death of her mother, only to be thrust into the role of caretaker for Rex. Despite her financially successful writing career, Donald lived a lifestyle that exceeded their income, leaving her $27,000 in debt. She sought psychiatric counseling for what essentially was a nervous breakdown. By 1949, Donald had become frustrated by his isolation in a small Southern California town and separated from Fisher. Donald sought further treatment at the Harkness Pavilion in New York. Fisher and Friede divorced on August 8, 1950.

Her father died June 2, 1953. Mary Frances subsequently sold the Ranch and the newspaper. She rented out Bareacres and moved to Napa Valley, renting "Red Cottage" south of St. Helena, California. Dissatisfied with the educational opportunities available to her children, Fisher sailed to France in 1954. She ended up in Aix-en-Provence, France. She planned to live in Aix using the proceeds from the sale of her father's paper.

Once in Aix, Fisher lodged with Mme Lanes at 17 rue Cardinale. She employed a French tutor and enrolled Anna and Kennedy, then aged 11 and 8, in the École St Catherine. She described Mme Lanes as "incredibly fusty and 'correcte,'" part of the "poor but proud aristocracy." In Aix, her life developed a pattern. Each day she would walk across town to pick up the girls from school at noon, and in late afternoon they ate snacks or ices at the Deux Garçons or Glacière. She never felt completely at home. She felt patronized because she was an American: "I was forever in their eyes the product of a naïve, undeveloped, and indeed infantile civilization ...". At one point, an important local woman, introduced to her through mutual friends in Dijon, invited her to lunch. During the meal, the woman sneered at Fisher:

"Tell me dear lady," she would shriek down the table at me, "tell me ... explain to all of us, how one can dare to call herself a writer on gastronomy in the United States, where, from everything we hear, gastronomy does not yet exist?"

=== St. Helena ===
Fisher left Provence in July 1955, and sailed for San Francisco on the freighter Vesuvio. After living in the city for a short period, she decided that the intense urban environment did not provide the children enough freedom. She sold Bareacres and used the proceeds to buy an old Victorian house on Oak Street in St. Helena. She owned the house until 1970, using it as a base for frequent travels. During extended absences she would rent it out.

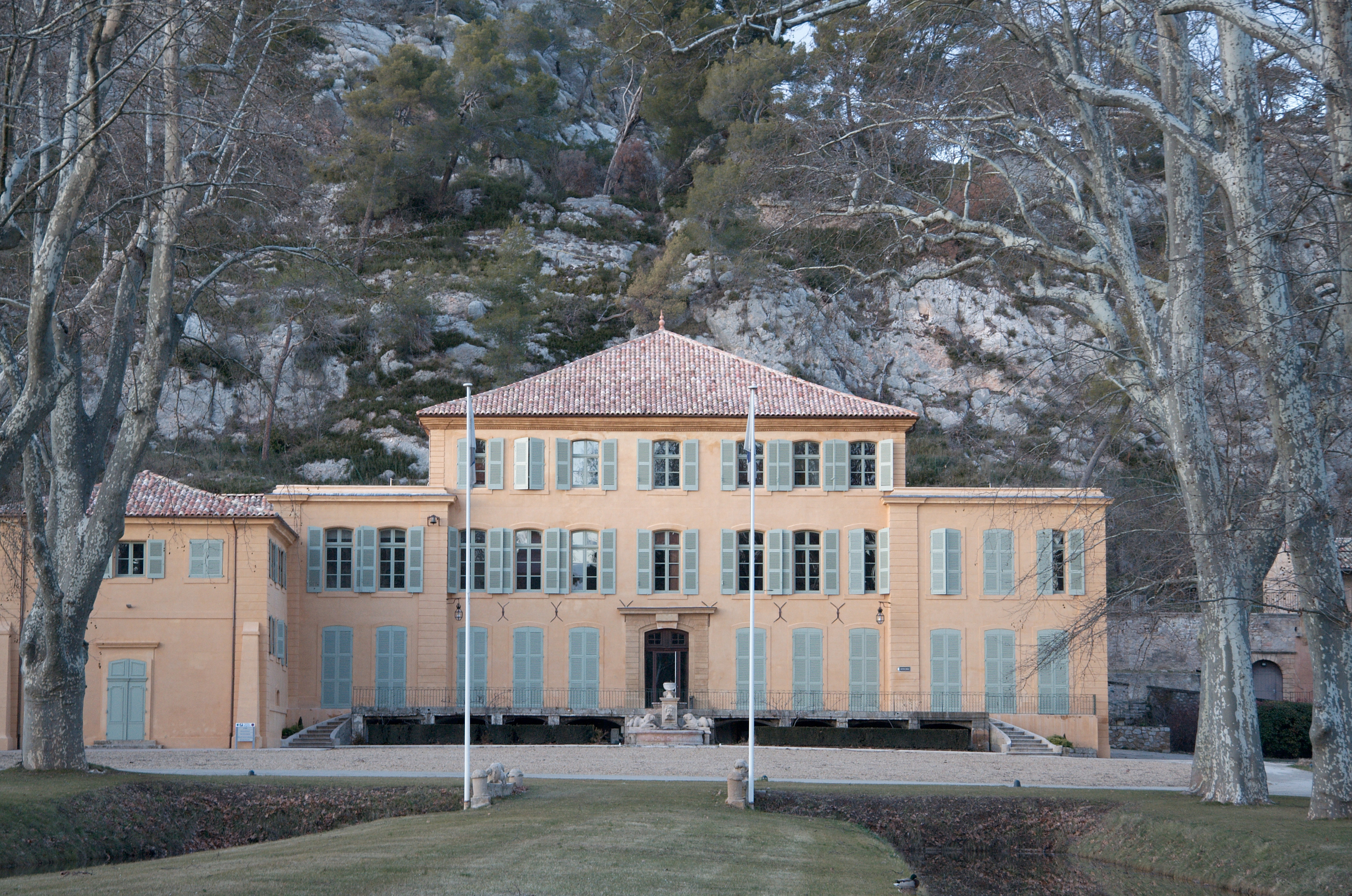
M.F.K. and her girls lived in the carriage house apartment near Château Tholonet around 1956.

In fall 1959 she moved the family to Lugano, Switzerland, where she hoped to introduce her daughters to a new language and culture. She enrolled the girls in the Istituto Sant'Anna Convent boarding school. She revisited Dijon and Aix. Falling back in love with Aix, she rented the L'Harmas farmhouse outside Aix. In July 1961, she returned to San Francisco.

In 1963, Fisher decided to try her hand at teaching at the African-American Piney Woods Country Life School in Mississippi. It was not a good experience for her. She received mixed reviews and was not invited back for another term.

She next contracted to write a series of cookbook reviews for The New Yorker magazine. Because her St. Helena house was rented out, she moved to her sister's home in Genoa, Nevada, to work on the assignment.

In 1966, Time-Life hired Fisher to write The Cooking of Provincial France. She traveled to Paris to research material for the book. While there, she met Paul and Julia Child, and through them James Beard. Child was hired to be a consultant on the book; Michael Field was the consulting editor. Field rented out the Childs' country home — La Pitchoune — to work on the book. When Fisher later moved into the house immediately after Field, she found the refrigerator empty. She remarked: "How could a person who loves food be in the south of France and not at least have a piece of cheese in the refrigerator?" Fisher was disappointed in the book's final form; it contained restaurant recipes, without regard to regional cuisine, and much of her signature prose had been cut.

=== Glen Ellen, California ===
In 1971, Fisher's friend David Bouverie, who owned a ranch in Glen Ellen, California, offered to build Fisher a house on his ranch. Fisher designed it, calling it "Last House". The presence of ranch staff made it easy for her to use the house as a base for frequent travels. She returned to France in 1970, 1973, 1976 and 1978, visiting, inter alia, La Roquette, Marseille, and Aix.

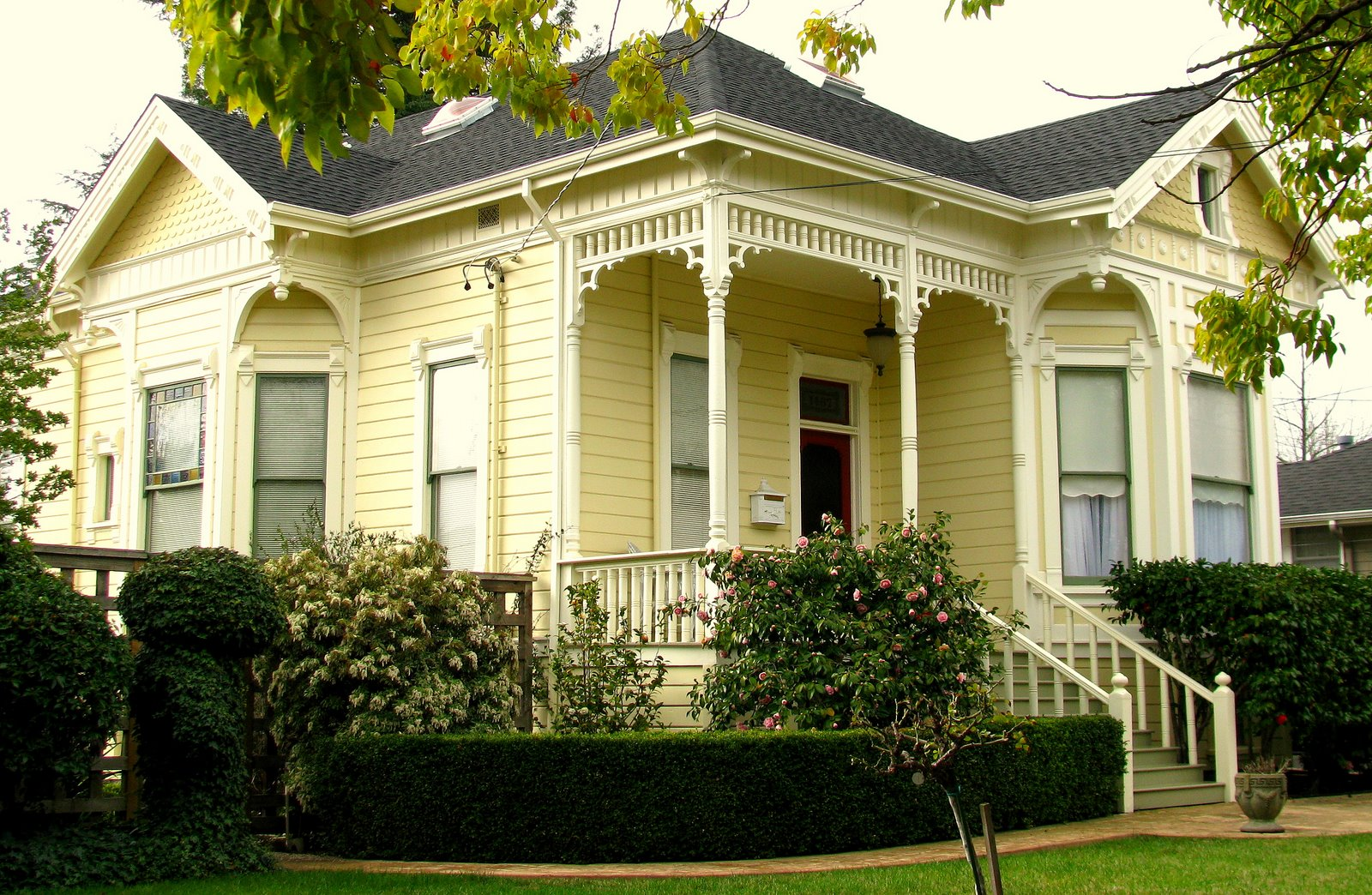
M F K Fisher Home in St Helena – Photo by Tash

== Death ==
After Dillwyn Parrish's death, Fisher considered herself a "ghost" of a person, but she continued to have a long and productive life, dying at the age of 83 in Glen Ellen, California, in 1992. She had long suffered from Parkinson's disease and arthritis. She spent the last twenty years of her life in "Last House".

== Bibliography ==
=== Books ===
- Serve It Forth (Harper 1937)
- "Victoria Berne" (M. F. K. Fisher and Dillwyn Parrish under a pseudonym), Touch and Go, a novel (Harper and Brothers 1939)
- Consider the Oyster (Duell, Sloan and Pierce 1941) ISBN 0-86547-335-8
- How to Cook a Wolf (Duell, Sloan and Pierce 1942; revised edition: North Point Press 1954) ISBN 0-86547-336-6
- The Gastronomical Me (Duell, Sloan and Pierce 1943) ISBN 0-86547-392-7
- Here Let Us Feast: A Book of Banquets (Viking 1946; revised edition: North Point Press 1986) ISBN 0-86547-206-8
- Not Now but Now, a novel (Viking 1947) ISBN 0-86547-072-3
- An Alphabet for Gourmets (Viking 1949) ISBN 0-86547-391-9
- Jean Anthelme Brillat-Savarin, The Physiology of Taste, or Meditations on Transcendental Gastronomy, translated and annotated by M. F. K. Fisher (Limited Editions Club 1949) ISBN 978-1-58243-103-1
- A Cordiall Water: A Garland of Odd & Old Receipts to Assuage the Ills of Man or Beast (Little Brown 1961) ISBN 0-86547-036-7
- Text by M. F. K. Fisher, photographs by Max Yavno, The Story of Wine in California (University of California Press 1962) OCLC 560806180 LCCN 62-18711
- Map of Another Town: A Memoir of Provence (Little Brown 1964) OCLC 1597658 LCCN 64-10958
- M. F. K. Fisher and the staff of Time-Life Books, The Cooking of Provincial France (Time-Life Books 1968), abridged version: Recipes: The Cooking of Provincial France
- With Bold Knife and Fork (Putnam 1969) ISBN 0-399-50397-8
- Among Friends (Knopf 1971) ISBN 0-86547-116-9
- A Considerable Town (Knopf 1978) ISBN 0-394-42711-4
- As They Were (Knopf 1982) ISBN 0-394-71348-6
- Sister Age (Knopf 1983) ISBN 0-394-72385-6.
- Dubious Honors (North Point Press 1988) ISBN 0-86547-318-8
- The Boss Dog: A Story of Provence (Yolla Bolly Press 1990) ISBN 0-86547-465-6
- Long Ago in France: The Years in Dijon (Prentice Hall 1991) ISBN 0-13-929548-8
- To Begin Again: Stories and Memoirs, 1908–1929 (Pantheon 1992) ISBN 0-679-41576-9
- Stay Me, Oh Comfort Me: Journals and Stories, 1933–1941 (Pantheon 1993) ISBN 0-679-75825-9
- Last House: Reflections, Dreams and Observations, 1943–1991 (Pantheon 1995) ISBN 0-679-77411-4
- The Theoretical Foot, a novel (Counterpoint 2016)

==== Collections ====
- The Art of Eating, collects Serve It Forth, Consider the Oyster, How to Cook a Wolf, The Gastronomical Me, and An Alphabet for Gourmets (MacMillan 1954) ISBN 0-394-71399-0
- Two Towns in Provence, collects Map of Another Town and A Considerable Town (Vintage 1983)
- A Life in Letters: Correspondence, 1929–1991, selected and compiled by Norah K. Barr, Marsha Moran, and Patrick Moran (Counterpoint 1998) ISBN 1-887178-46-5
- The Measure of Her Powers: An M.F.K. Fisher Reader, edited by Dominique Gioia (Counterpoint 1999)
- From the Journals of M.F.K. Fisher, collects To Begin Again, Stay Me, Oh Comfort Me, and Last House (Pantheon 1999) ISBN 0-375-70807-3
- A Stew or a Story: An Assortment of Short Works by M. F. K. Fisher, gathered and Introduced by Joan Reardon (Shoemaker & Hoard, 2006)

==== Limited editions and other books ====
- Judith S. Clancy, Not a Station but a Place: Drawings/Collages of and related to the Gare de Lyon, Paris, introduced by M. F. K. Fisher (Synergistic Press 1979) ISBN 0-912184-02-7
- Spirits of the Valley (Targ Editions 1985)
- Catherine Plagemann, Fine Preserving: M.F.K. Fisher's Annotated Edition of Catherine Plagemann's Cookbook, annotated by M. F. K. Fisher (Aris Books 1986) ISBN 0-671-63065-2
- Jean Anthelme Brillat-Savarin, Aphorisms of Jean Anthelme Brillat-Savarin from His Work, The Physiology of Taste, translated by M. F. K. Fisher (1998)
- Two Kitchens in Provence (Yolla Bolly Press 1999)
- Home Cooking: An Excerpt from a Letter to Eleanor Friede, December, 1970 (Weatherford Press 2000)

=== Essays and reporting ===
- Fisher, M. F. K. (September 6, 2021). "Once a tramp, always ... : on caviar, potato chips, and other favorites–of–a–lifetime". Gastronomy Recalled. September 7, 1968. The New Yorker. Vol. 97, no. 27. pp. 18–21.
