= Celta =

Celta is Galician, Portuguese and Spanish for the Celts. It may also refer to:

- Certificate in English Language Teaching to Adults (CELTA), an English teaching certificate
- Celta (train), an international train service connecting Vigo and Porto
- Chevrolet Celta, a low cost supermini car produced by General Motors do Brasil
- Celta de Vigo, a Spanish football club
  - Celta de Vigo B, the reserve team of Celta de Vigo
- CD Vigo FS, a former futsal club based in Vigo, Spain
- Celta de Vigo Baloncesto, a Spanish women's basketball from Vigo
- Porco Celta, a Galician pig
