= Chanfana =

Portuguese meat stew

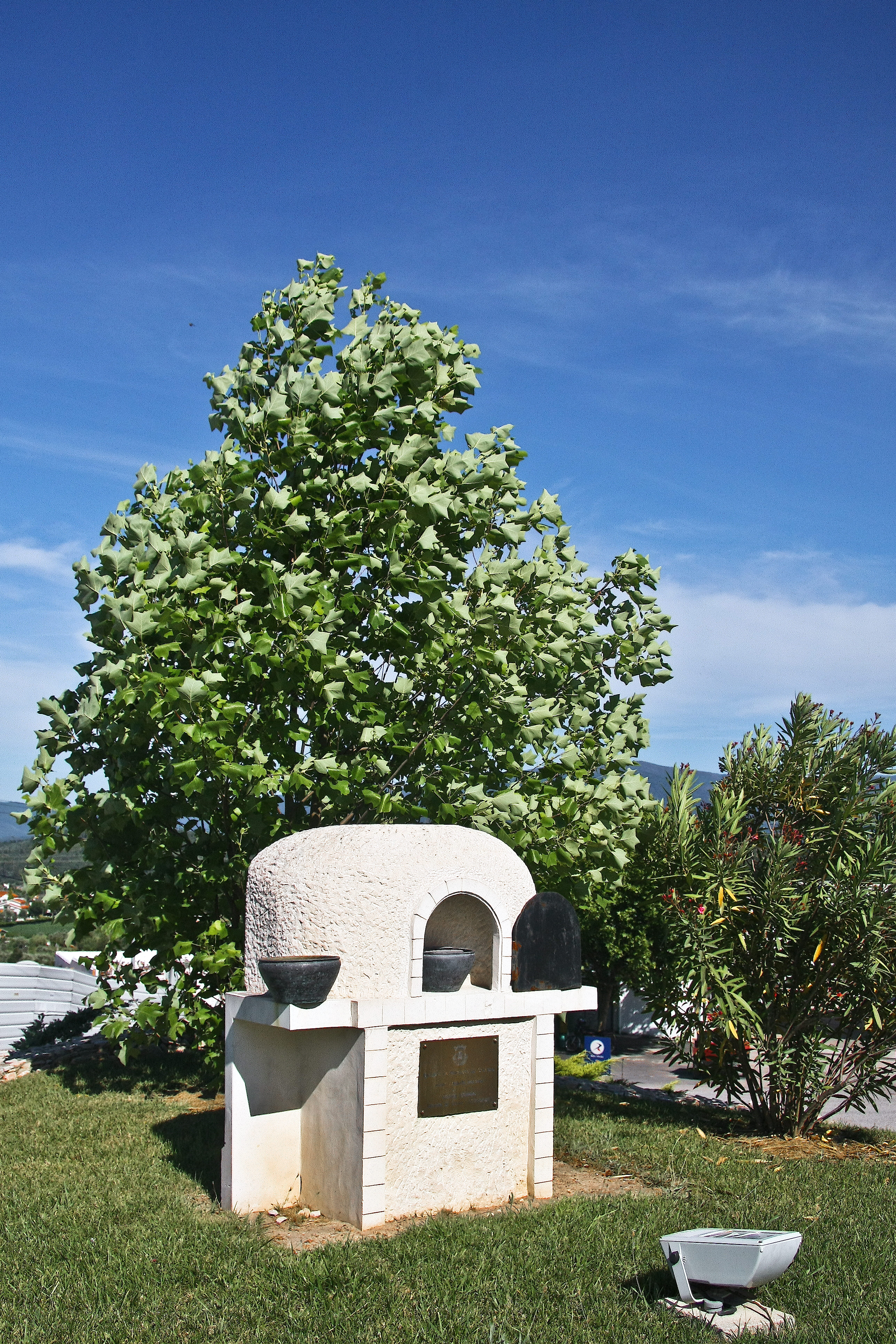
A monument in Semide, Miranda do Corvo, erected as an homage to chanfana, which was traditionally made in wood-fired ovens like this.

Chanfana is a traditional Portuguese dish made with old goat meat seasoned in a flavorful marinade with an abundance of red wine, roasted the next day inside a traditional Portuguese black clay pot in an oven, traditionally wood-fired.

== Overview ==
The chanfana is referenced in writings from the 17th century. Miguel de Cervantes, Bocage, Nicolau Tolentino de Almeida, Miguel Torga, among others, refer to this dish or variants of it, and usually recall it as an economical dish that uses meat from old goats that no longer gave milk or offspring; spare wine; easily found laurel leaves; garlic; stored olive oil, and ordinary and abundant pig fat. It is a typical dish originally from the region comprising Miranda do Corvo and Vila Nova de Poiares, very common and well-known in all of the District of Coimbra, particularly in the highlands to the east of the city of Coimbra, Viseu and beyond across the entire historical Beira, currently in the modern Portuguese administrative division known as Centro Region. It is said to be an old recipe created or popularized by local Benedictine nuns in a convent of Semide, Miranda do Corvo. In both Miranda do Corvo and Vila Nova de Poiares, it is considered a local gastronomic specialty, and both towns claim the title of "Capital of Chanfana".
