= Tigelada =

Portuguese dessert

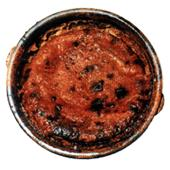
Tigelada on a clay bowl

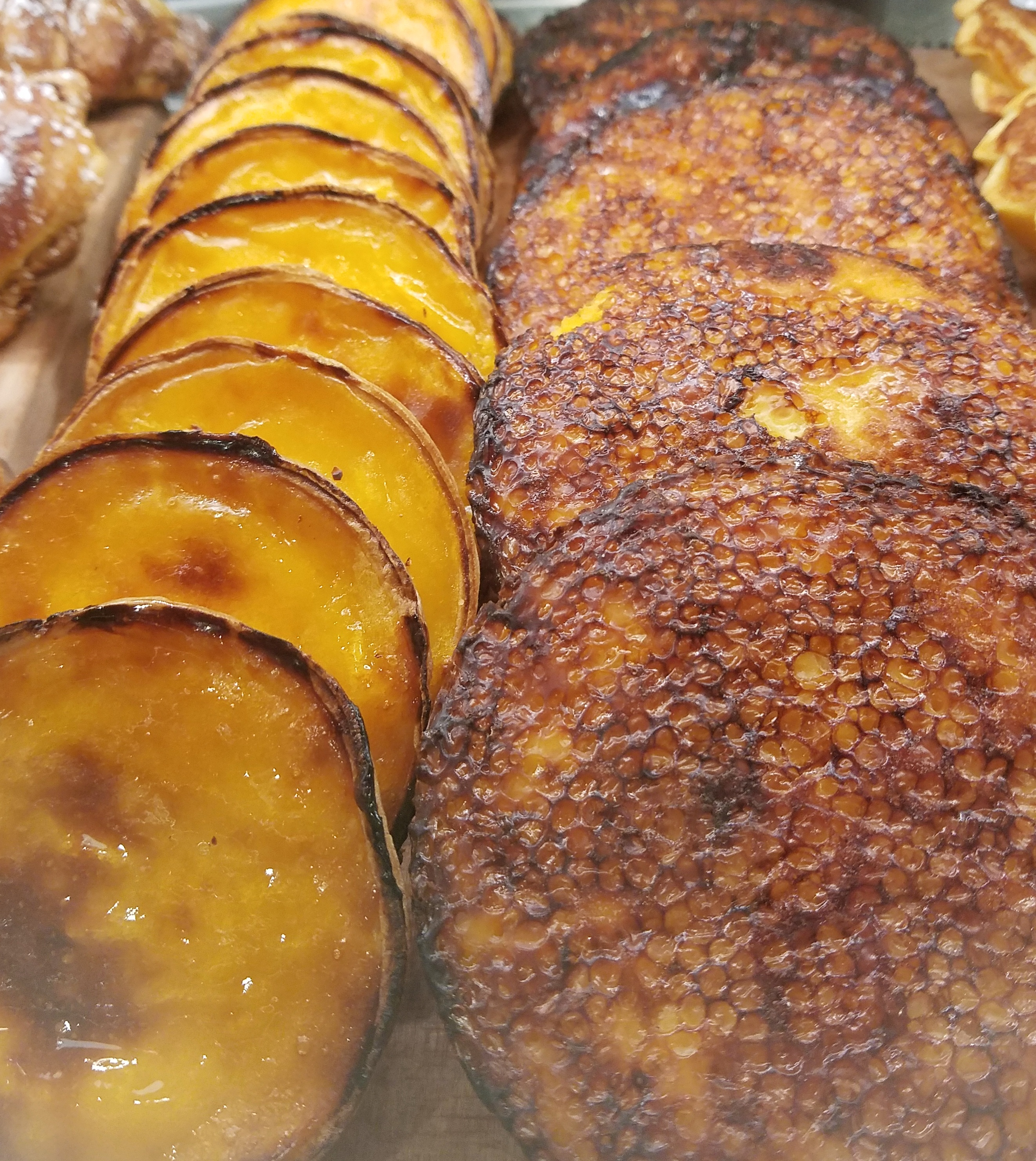
Tigelada (right) next to a Tarte de Nata

Tigelada or Tigelada de Abrantes is a typical Portuguese dessert made in a wood-fired oven. Its cooking is done in a pre-heated unglazed clay bowl.

== Description ==
A Tigelada is in the form of a disk with a thickness of 2 cm (0.79 in) and a diameter of 10 to 12 cm (3.9 to 4.7 in). It presents a yellow-brown color and a sharp texture. Its bottom part is honeycomb due to the high temperature that the bowl reaches in the oven before the mixture is added. Tigeladas are made with eggs, milk, unleavened flour, sugar, lemon and salt.

== History ==
It has its origin in Lisboa e Vale do Tejo. By consulting the historical archives, the recipe for a sweet called Tigeladas de D.ª Maria de Vilhena was found in the Cookbook of Infanta D.ª Maria, published by the National Press – Casa da Moeda, which coincides with the recipe of Tigeladas de Abrantes. In a more or less consensual way, the product is considered a conventual sweet. There is a set of documentation in the Historical Archive of the Municipality of Abrantes, which contains a list of recipes from the Convento da Graça de Abrantes, which contains the recipe for the Tigeladas. However, its origin is claimed in several locations in the municipality of Abrantes.
