= Porco bísaro =

Pig breed native to Portugal

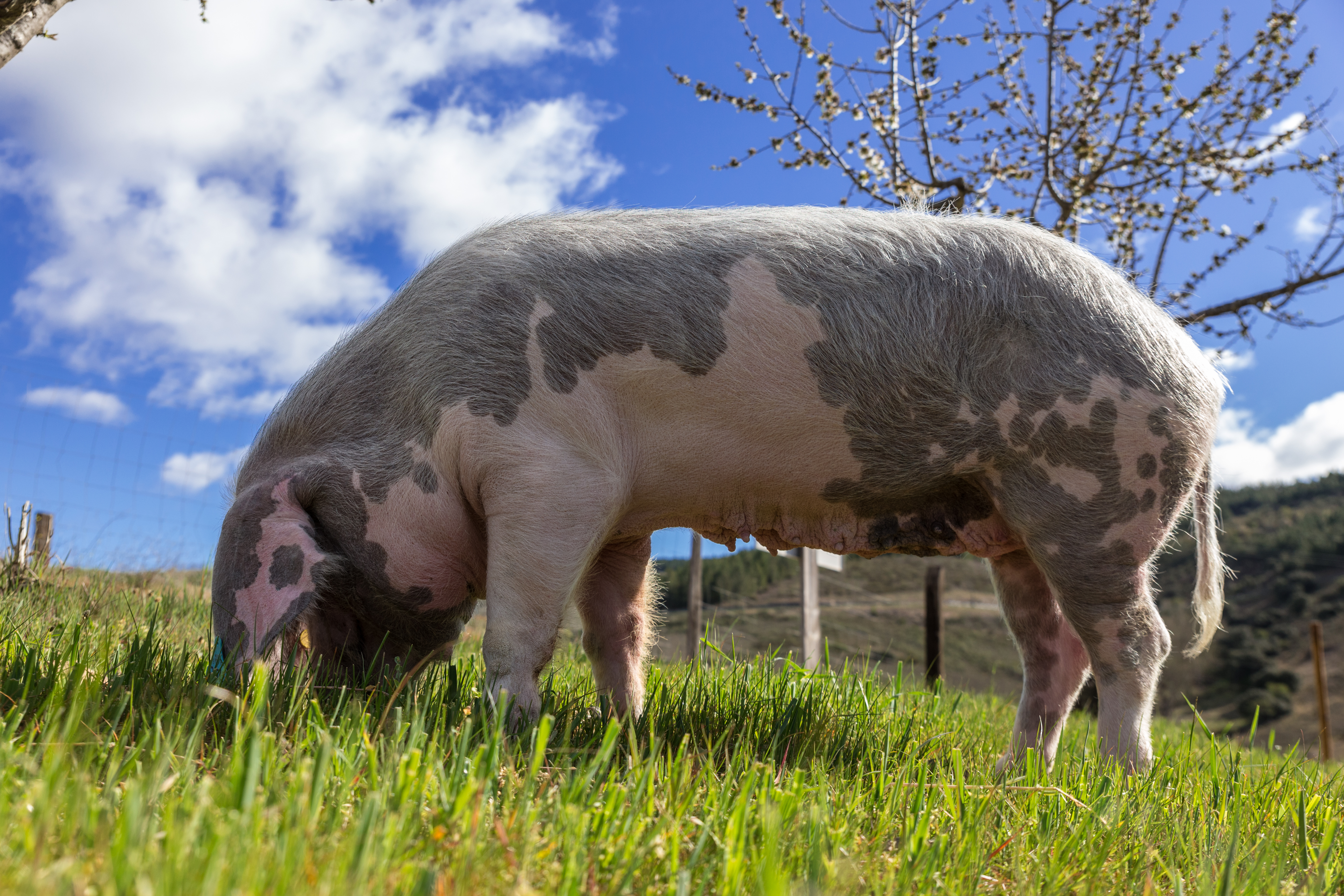
Porco Bísaro

Porco Bísaro is a domestic pig breed that is native to Portugal, typically from the Trás-os-Montes, Alto-Douro, Minho, and Beira regions.

The Porco Bísaro was nearly extinct in the early 1990s. To revert this decline, the National Association of Breeders of Bísaro Swine (ANCSUB - Associação Nacional de Criadores de Suínos de Raça Bísara) was created in 1994. Since then, ANCSUB is also responsible for the management of the respective zoo technical registry.

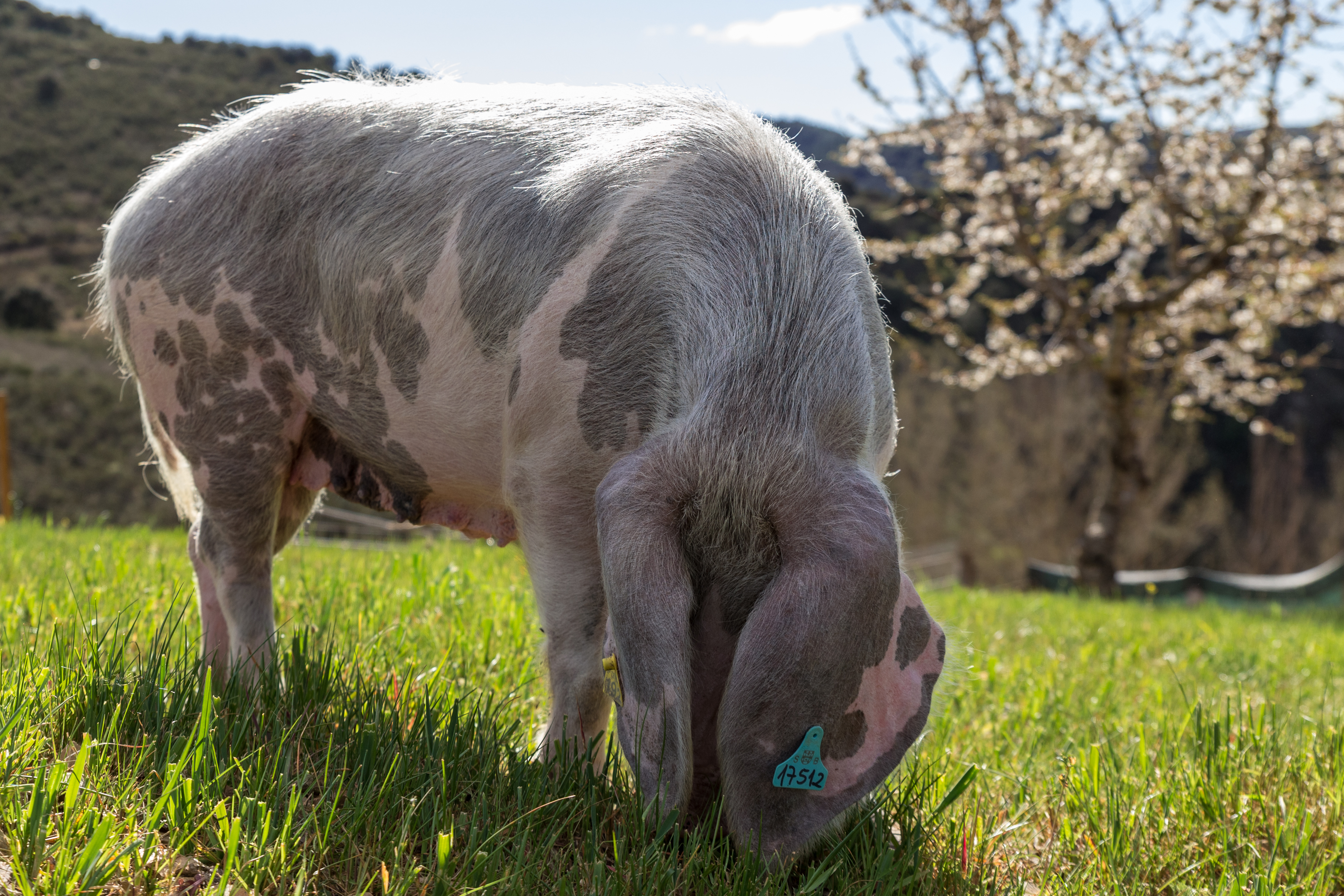
Porco Bísaro grown free-range, Trás-os-Montes

Porco Bísaro is known as Bísaro and sometimes Celta (similarly to Galicia's porco celta), as proposed and used by Sanson to express the antiquity of the breed. It was the only pig breed in Northern Portugal, Galicia, France and the British islands before the introduction of the Asian and Romanesque breeds.

In 1878, Macedo Pinto described the Porco Bísaro as an animal belonging to the Typo Bizaro or Celta with the morphological characteristics mentioned above. He distinguished between two varieties within the breed, according to the corpulence, color and greater or lesser amount of bristles.

Pinto said they weighed from 200 to 250 kg of carcass and others between 120 and 150 kg; as for color, he says they are mostly black, also some spotted and those with white fur were called Galegos, as they come from Galicia. Molarinhos were spotted animals that had few bristles and smooth, smooth skin. The same author also mentions that they are animals of slow and late growth, difficult to fatten (only completing their growth at the age of two), producing more lean meat than fat and accumulating more in the fat than in thick blankets of bacon.

In 1946, Cunha Ortigosa classifies the Porco Bísaro as one of the three national breeds. When describing the varieties within the breed, in addition to Galega and Beirôa which includes Molarinho and Cerdões types.

Porco Bísaro has been awarded several Protected Designation of Origin (PDO) and Protected Geographical Indication (PGI) statuses due to its exceptional meat qualities.
