= Amêijoas à Bulhão Pato =

Portuguese seafood dish

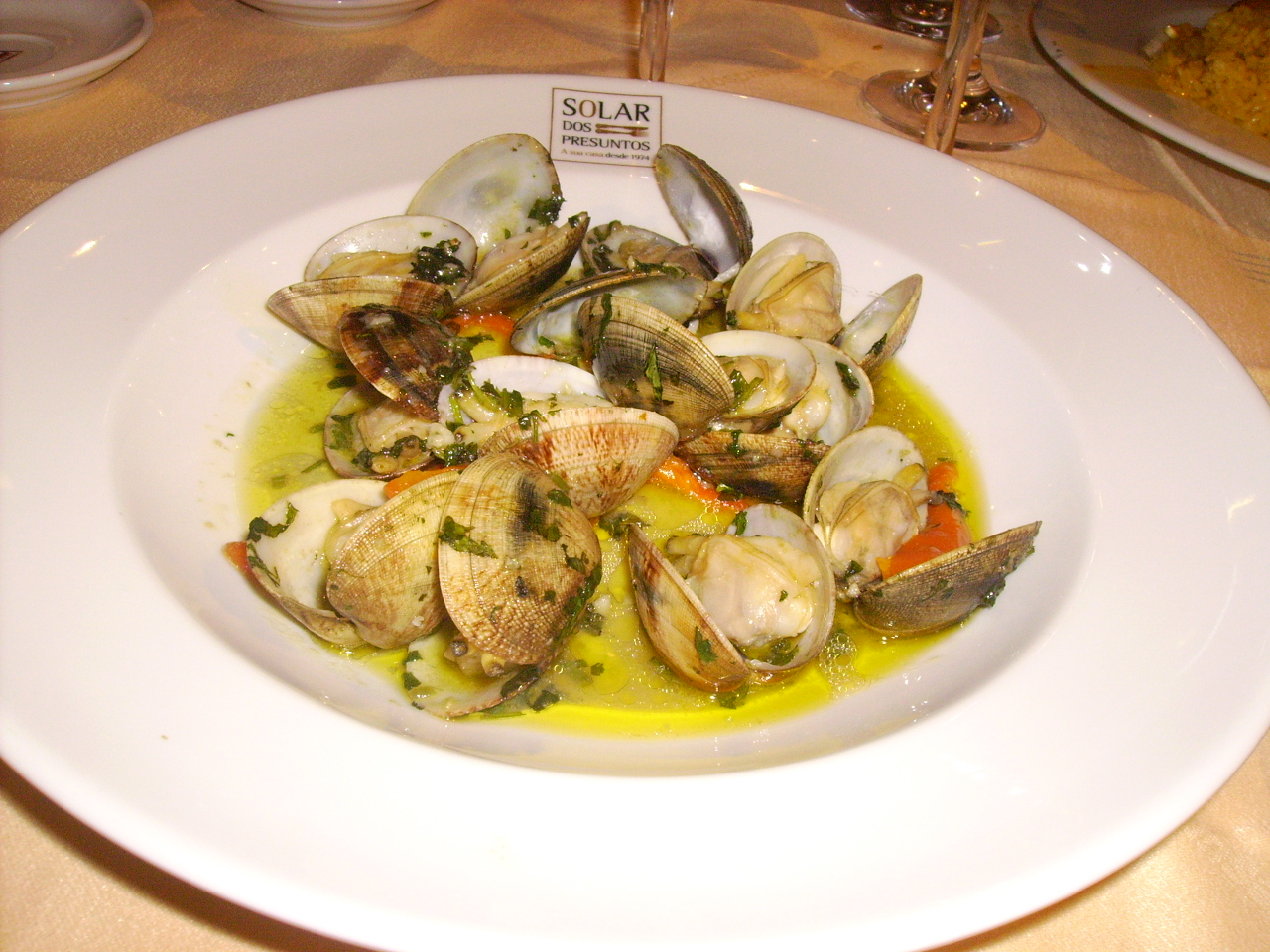
- Amêijoas à Bulhão Pato served with olive oil and garlic sauce
- Alternative names: Bulhão Pato-style clams
- Course: Appetizer
- Place of origin: Portugal
- Region or state: Lisbon
- Associated cuisine: Portuguese cuisine
- Created by: João da Mata
- Invented: 1850s
- Serving temperature: Hot
- Main ingredients: Clams, olive oil, garlic, coriander, white wine

Amêijoas à Bulhão Pato (Portuguese pronunciation: [ɐˈmɐjʒuɐz a buˈʎɐ̃w ˈpatu] is a traditional Portuguese dish consisting of clams prepared with a sauce made of olive oil, garlic, and fresh coriander. A staple of Portuguese cuisine, it is typically served as a petisco (snack or appetizer) throughout the country, particularly in the Lisbon region.

The dish is named in honor of the 19th-century Portuguese poet Raimundo António de Bulhão Pato. Despite the association, there is no definitive evidence that he created the recipe. It has often been attributed to the chef João da Mata, who is said to have prepared it in homage to the poet’s appreciation for gastronomy, although this attribution remains debated.

While the core ingredients are standardized, the preparation often includes white wine or lemon juice, and it is traditionally served with crusty bread used to soak up the sauce. Due to its prevalence in traditional restaurants and its historical association with Lisbon, it is recognized as a staple of Portuguese seafood cuisine.
