= Celtic pig =

Breed of pig

Celtic
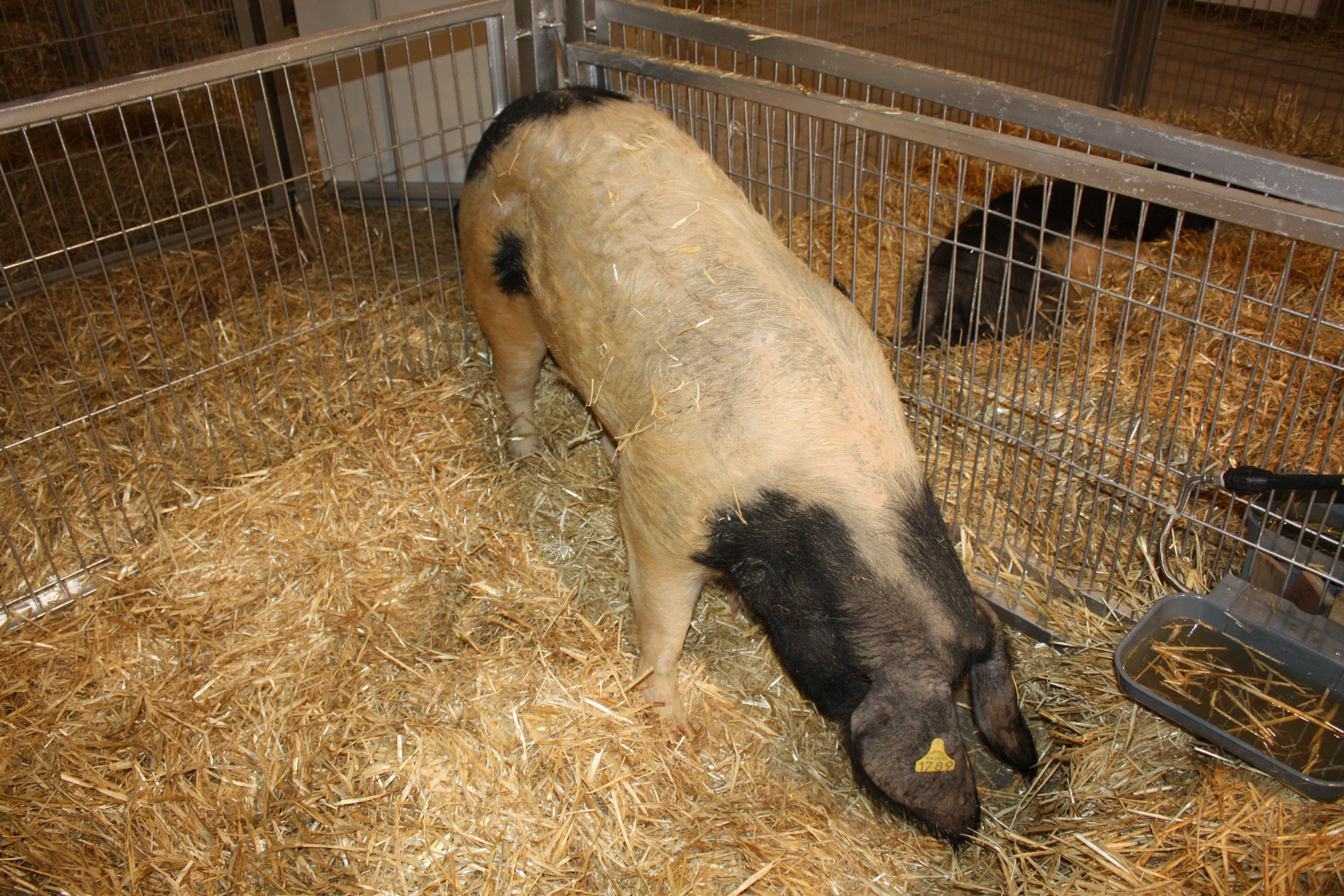
- Celtic pig in Silleda (2010).
- Conservation status: Rare breed
- Other names: Galician: Porco celta
- Country of origin: Galicia, Spain
- Distribution: Galicia and Portugal

Traits
- Height: Male: 80 cm (31 in)
- Skin color: Black & White

The Celtic pig (Galician: Porco celta) is a breed of pig native to the autonomous community of Galicia in north-western Spain.

== History ==
Though they were relatively common until the early 20th century, Celtic pigs had nearly disappeared by 1980s. The breed is recovering and there are now more than 2 500 purebred sows.

== Characteristics ==
Celtic pigs grow more slowly and develop more fat than modern breeds like the Large White, making them less well-suited to intensive commercial meat production, but ideal for the creation of cured pork products.

== Livestock census ==
Year	Sows	Boars	Total
2009	2 643	1 751	4 394
2010	2 687	1 787	4 474
2011	2 587	1 889	4 476
2012	2 684	1 907	4 591
2013	2 634	1 668	4 302
2014	2 532	1 596	4 128
