= Dippy egg =

Dippy eggs may refer to:

- Over-easy fried eggs (Pennsylvania English)
- Soft-boiled eggs (United Kingdom English)
