= Salteado =

Salteado (Spanish for "jumped") may refer to:

- Corrido (Spain), genre of traditional music and dance
- Sautéing, cooking technique

== See also ==
- Saltado
