= Bife a cavalo =

Steak and egg dish

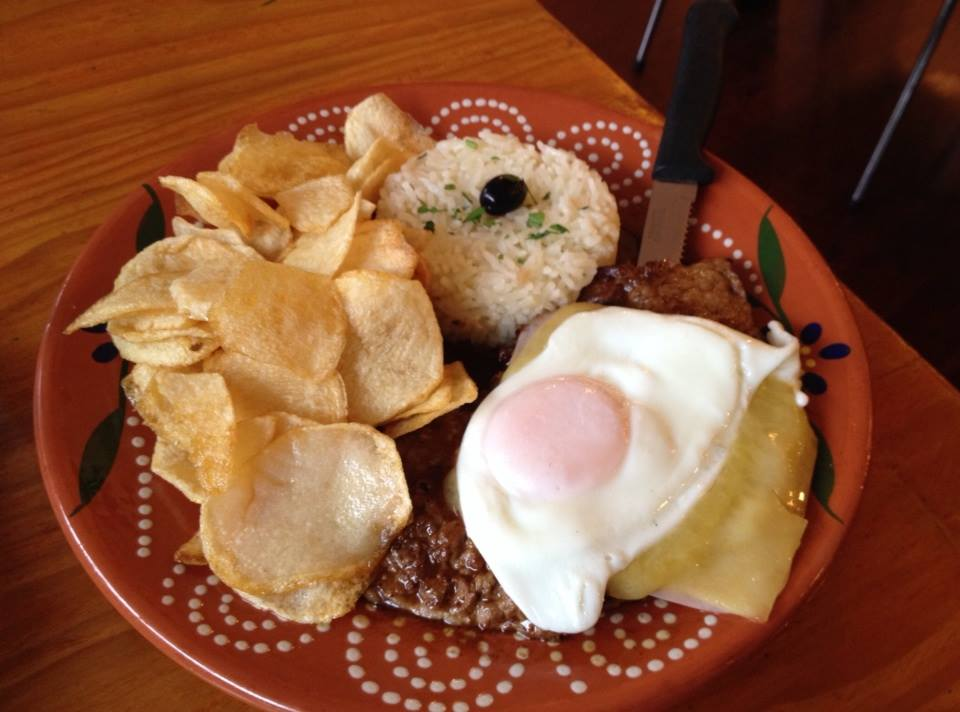
Bife com ovo a cavalo

Bife a cavalo, bife com ovo a cavalo, or bife a caballo is a traditional dish in Portugal, Brazil, Paraguay and Argentina. It consists of a grilled, or sometimes pan-fried steak, with fried eggs on top. It is usually served with rice and beans, a salad, and French fries. Its name literally means "horseback-riding steak", as an allusion to the appearance that the fried eggs are "riding" the steak. In Argentina, bife a caballo is usually served with French fries.

It may be prepared from several beef cuts, such as alcatra, coxão-mole, maminha, or fraldinha.

== Origin ==
"Steak on horseback" is a recipe of European origin, believed to be from England. In France, it was known as bifteck à cheval or œuf à cheval ("egg on horseback"), consisting of grilled beef steak, with fried eggs on top. Its appearance resembled riding saddles. It arrived in Brazil with the Portuguese, under the influence of the French name.

== See also ==
- Lomo a lo pobre
- Steak and eggs
