= Phnom Penh Noodle House =

Cambodian restaurant in Seattle, Washington, U.S.

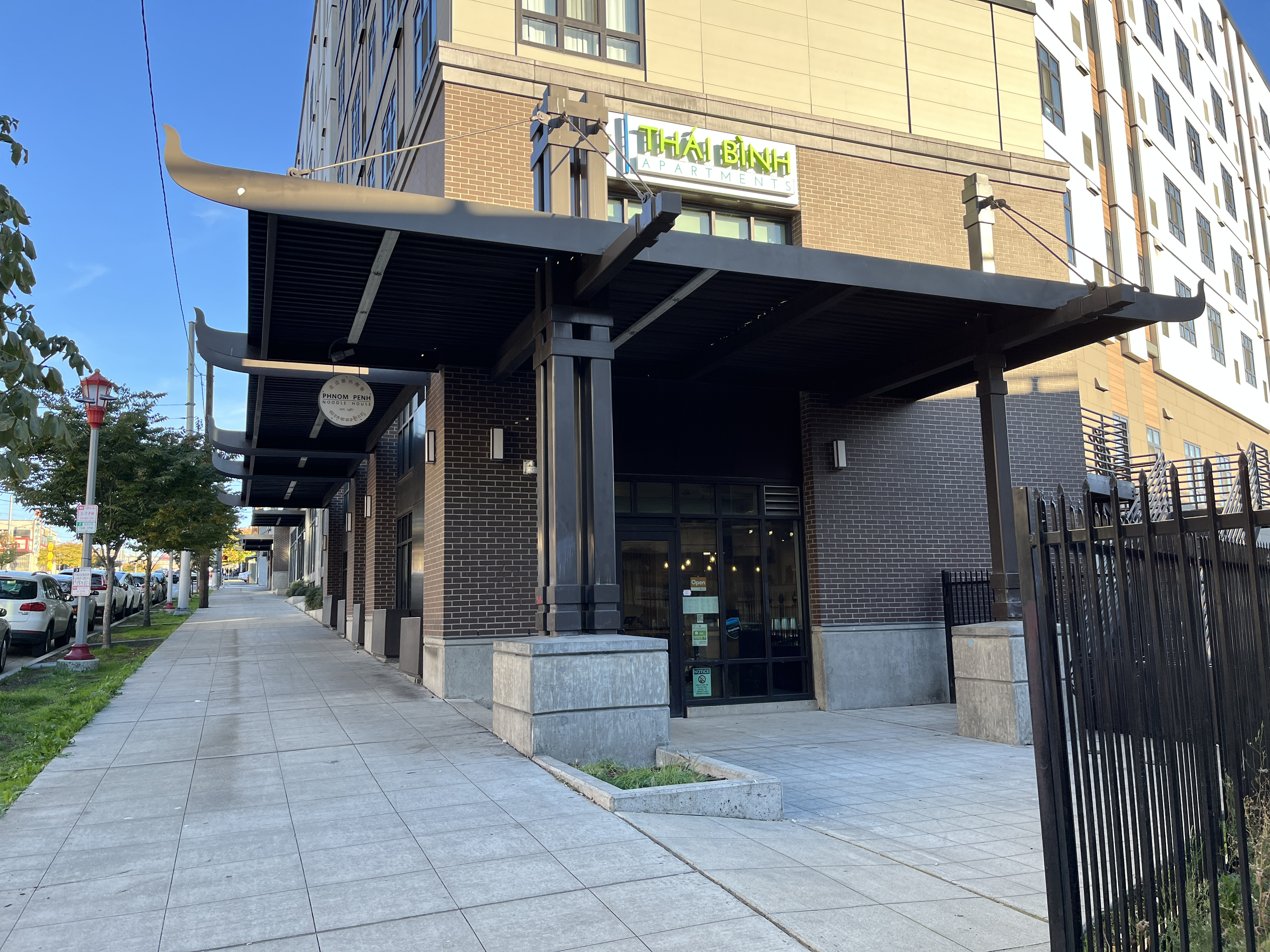
- The restaurant's exterior, 2023
- Interactive map of Phnom Penh Noodle House

Restaurant information
- Established: 1987
- Food type: Cambodian
- Location: 913 South Jackson Street, Seattle, Washington, 98104, United States
- Coordinates: 47°35′56.5″N 122°19′14″W
- Website: phnompenhnoodlehouse.com

Phnom Penh Noodle House (Khmer: ហាងគុយទាវភ្នំពេញ, simplified Chinese: 金边潮州粿條; traditional Chinese: 金邊潮州粿條) is a Cambodian restaurant in Seattle, in the U.S. state of Washington.

== Description ==
The Cambodian restaurant Phnom Penh Noodle House is located in Seattle's Chinatown–International District. The menu has included beef lok lak, honey-black pepper chicken wings, mee katang, and kuyteav.

== History ==
The restaurant opened in 1987, serving seven noodle dishes. Following a two-year hiatus starting in 2018, Phnom Penh re-opened in August 2020, during the COVID-19 pandemic. According to Northwest Asian Weekly, Phnom Penh Noodle House is the city's only Cambodian restaurant as of 2020. The restaurant's founder Sam Ung died in 2025.

== Reception ==
Jay Friedman included the business in Eater Seattle's 2022 list of nineteen "knockout" restaurants in the Chinatown–International District. Phnom Penh was included in The Infatuation's 2025 list of the 25 best restaurants in the Chinatown–International District.
