= Fried egg =

Cooked dish made from one or more eggs

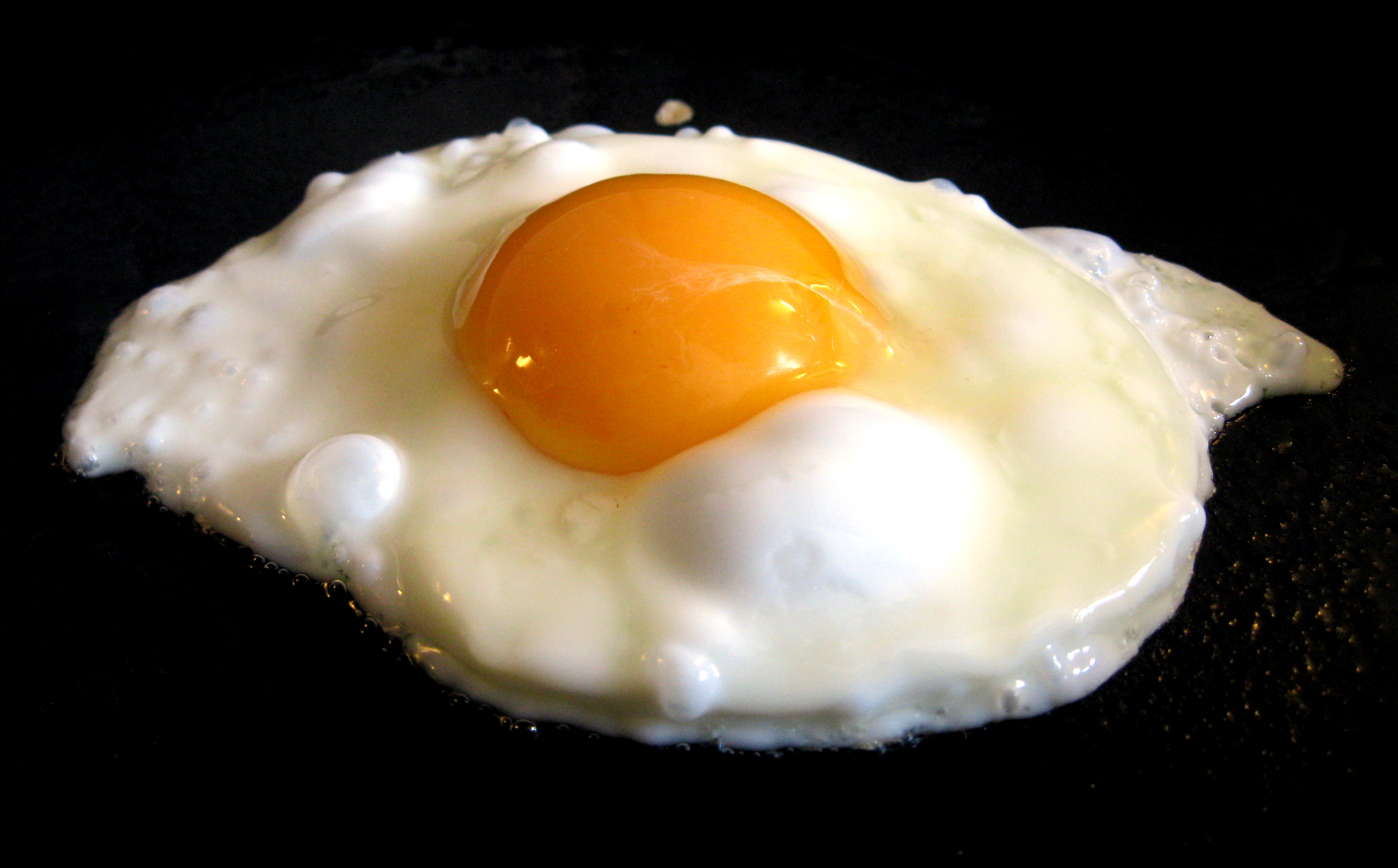
- Course: Breakfast, lunch, supper, or as a snack
- Main ingredients: Eggs

A fried egg is a dish made from one or more eggs which are removed from their shells, placed into a frying pan and cooked. They are traditionally eaten for breakfast or brunch in many countries but may also be served at other times of the day.

== Regional adaptations and specialities ==
=== Austria, Germany, and Switzerland ===
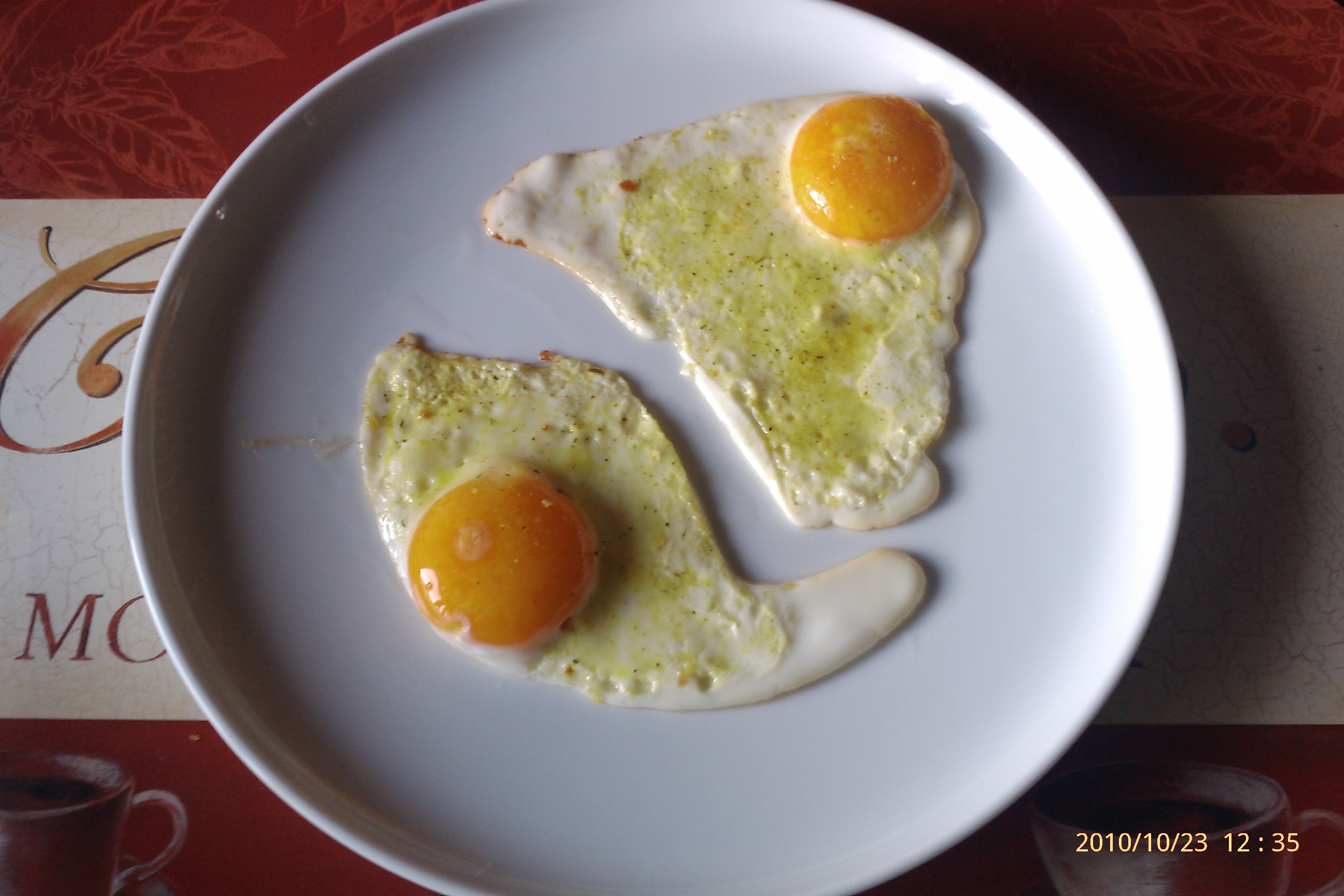
Fried eggs served with Vegeta spice in Croatia

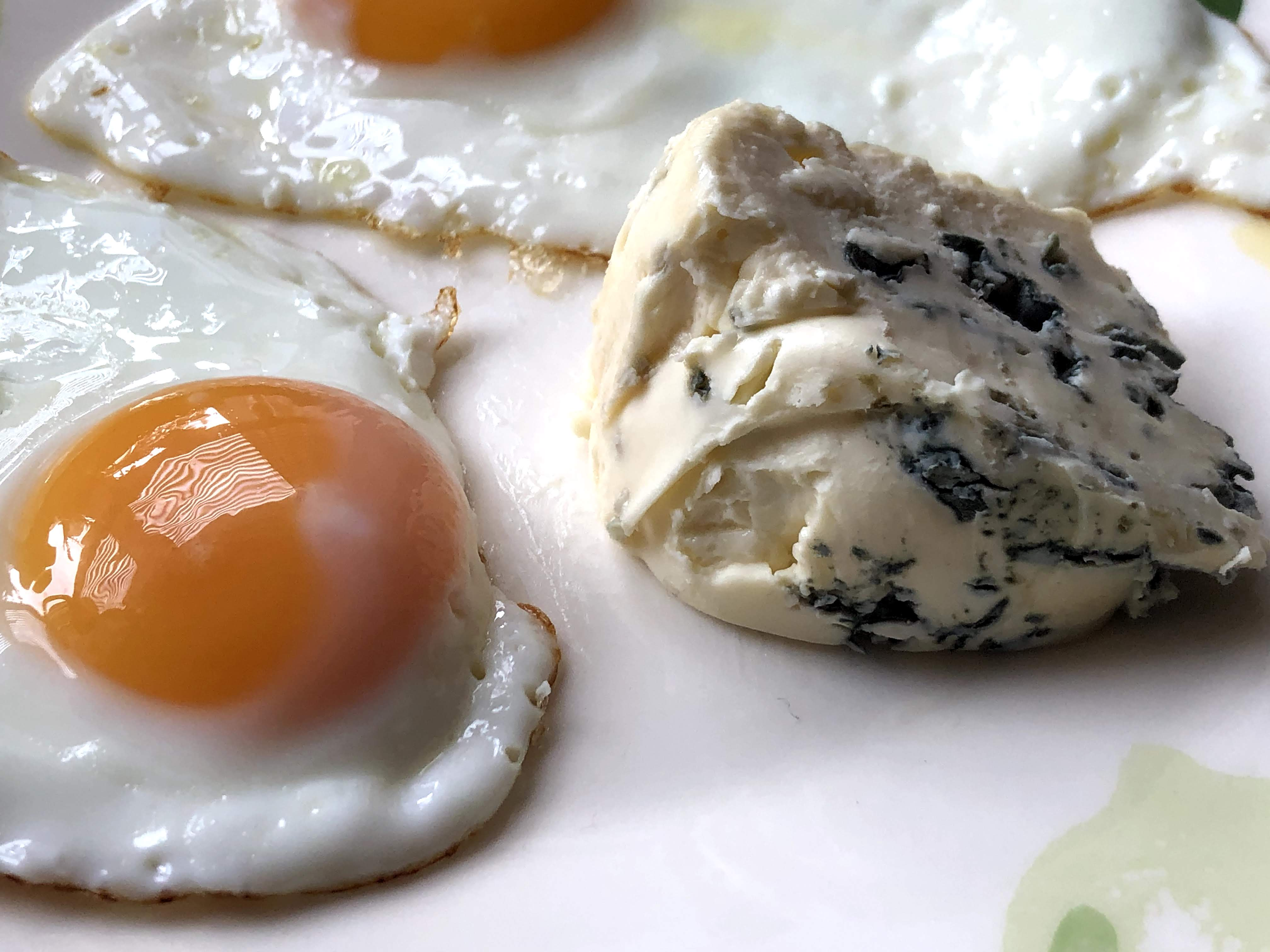
Two eggs with blue cheese on a plate

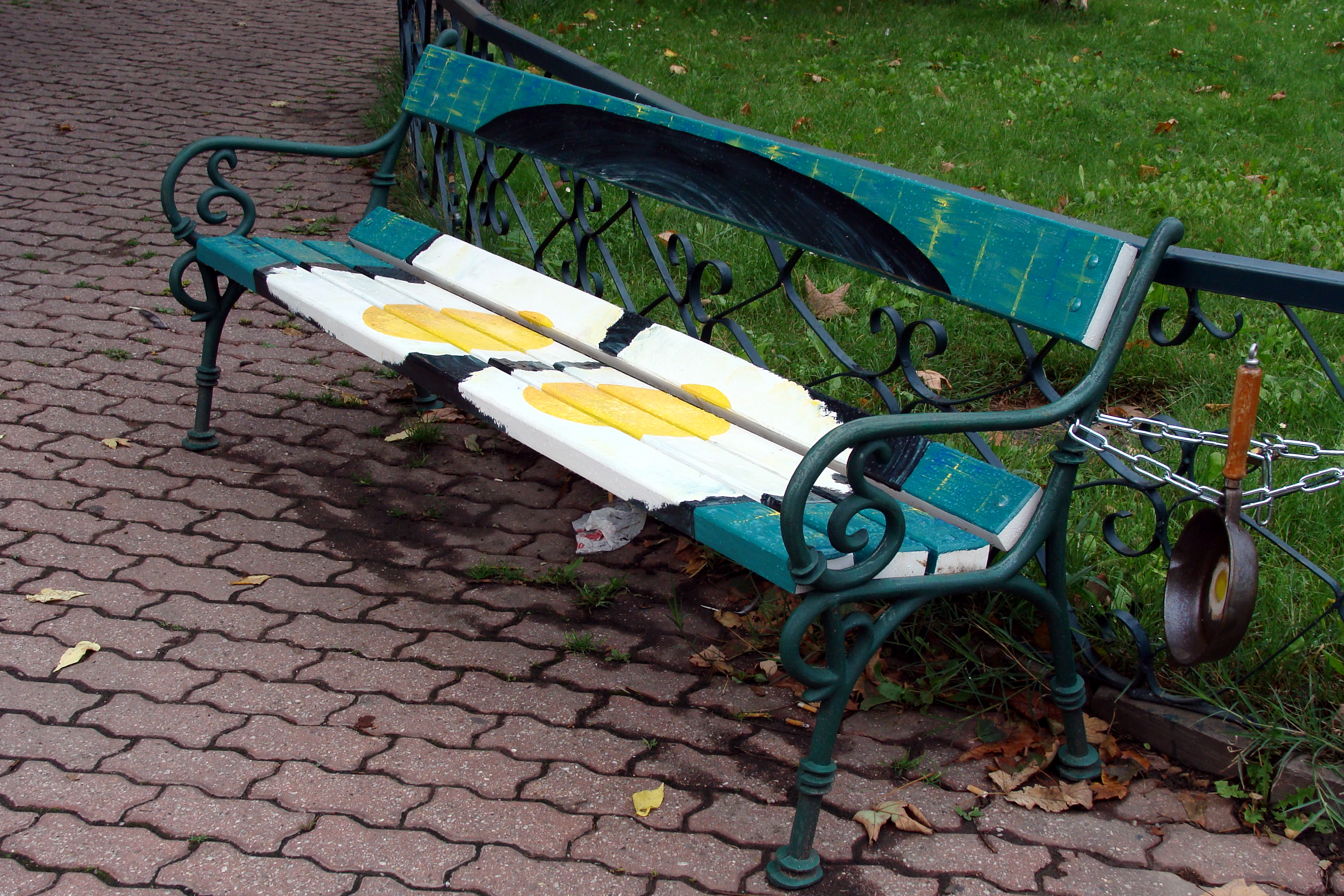
Two Austrian-type fried eggs painted on a bench with a frying pan next to it, Vienna

Fried eggs (Spiegeleier; singular Spiegelei) are a crucial part of such traditional German dishes as Strammer Max (the egg is fried on one side with an unbroken yolk, and served "sunny side up" atop an open ham sandwich) or Hamburger Schnitzel / Holsteiner Schnitzel / Fernfahrerschnitzel ("trucker's schnitzel") – a similarly prepared fried egg served on a Wiener Schnitzel.

Spiegeleier mit Bratkartoffeln

Fried eggs over (or side-by-side with) pan-fried potatoes is another common dish, sometimes served with spinach as a third component of the meal. Some German cooks break the yolk and distribute it across the surface of the white during the frying.

All of the above are typically lunch, rather than breakfast, dishes, although eggs themselves (like boiled or scrambled eggs) are a common part of a German breakfast.

=== Cambodia ===
In Cambodia, a fried egg is often served on top of a common dish called beef lok lak. It is made of a ring of spinach, onion finely shaven, and tomato with either a portion of venison or beef with gravy, topped with a fried egg, either duck or chicken egg.

=== Indonesia ===
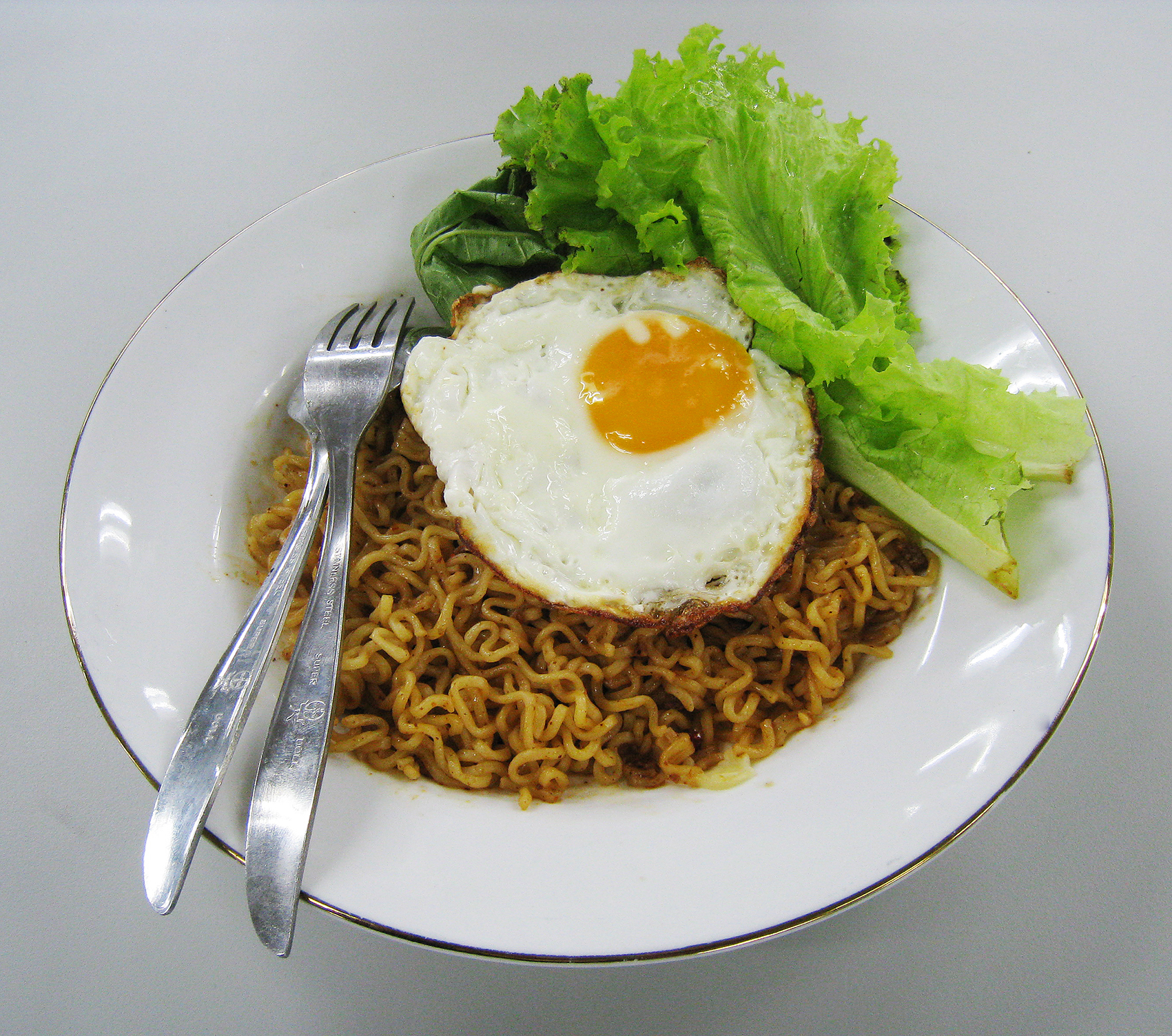
Mie goreng noodle served with fried egg and vegetables

In Indonesia, fried eggs are served either as telur ceplok or telur mata sapi (Indonesian for "bull's eye egg") which refer to sunny side up eggs, as telur dadar (omelette) or as telur orak-arik (scrambled eggs). The fried eggs are either setengah matang which is half cooked with still runny yolk or matang which is well done. When speaking English, an Indonesian waiter may ask if you want the egg fried "one side" or "two sides". Fried eggs, especially bull's eye egg, are a popular topping for Indonesian fried rice (nasi goreng) and fried noodle (mie goreng), either freshly prepared noodle or cooked from instant noodle Indomie Mi goreng. Many Indonesians also tend to dip their kerupuk (deep-fried fish crackers) into the runny yolk of the egg, a favourite among locals.

A simple dish of fried sunny side up egg served on top of steamed rice drizzled with kecap manis sweet soy sauce, is a favourite dish among Indonesian children. Other than served with rice, fried eggs might be served with bread as a sandwich for breakfast. Seasoning includes salt and pepper, sweet soy sauce, and sometimes hot and spicy sambal chili paste.

=== Ireland and the United Kingdom ===
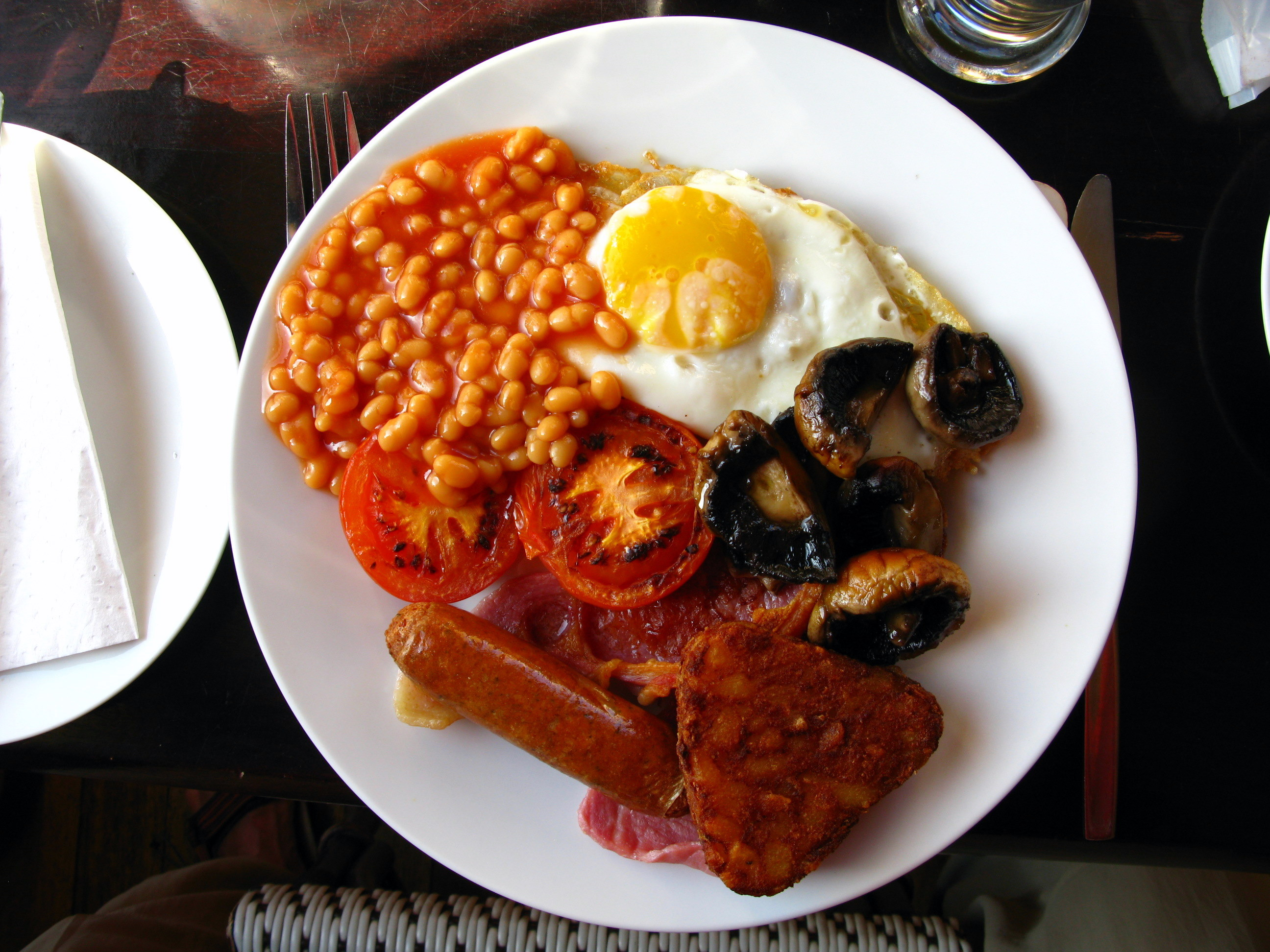
This full English breakfast includes bacon, fried egg, black pudding, grilled tomatoes, fried mushrooms, hash browns (not traditional), baked beans, and sausages.

Fried eggs can be served on toast, with chips, or in a sandwich, with bacon, sausages, and a variety of condiments. Eggs are often part of the full breakfast commonly eaten in Britain and Ireland. Fried eggs are often served with ham or gammon steak as a popular pub meal. The egg is cooked on high heat and hot fat, oil, or water may be splashed onto the top of the egg to baste it and cook the white. They are usually cooked without turning over.

=== Hispanic and Lusitanic world ===
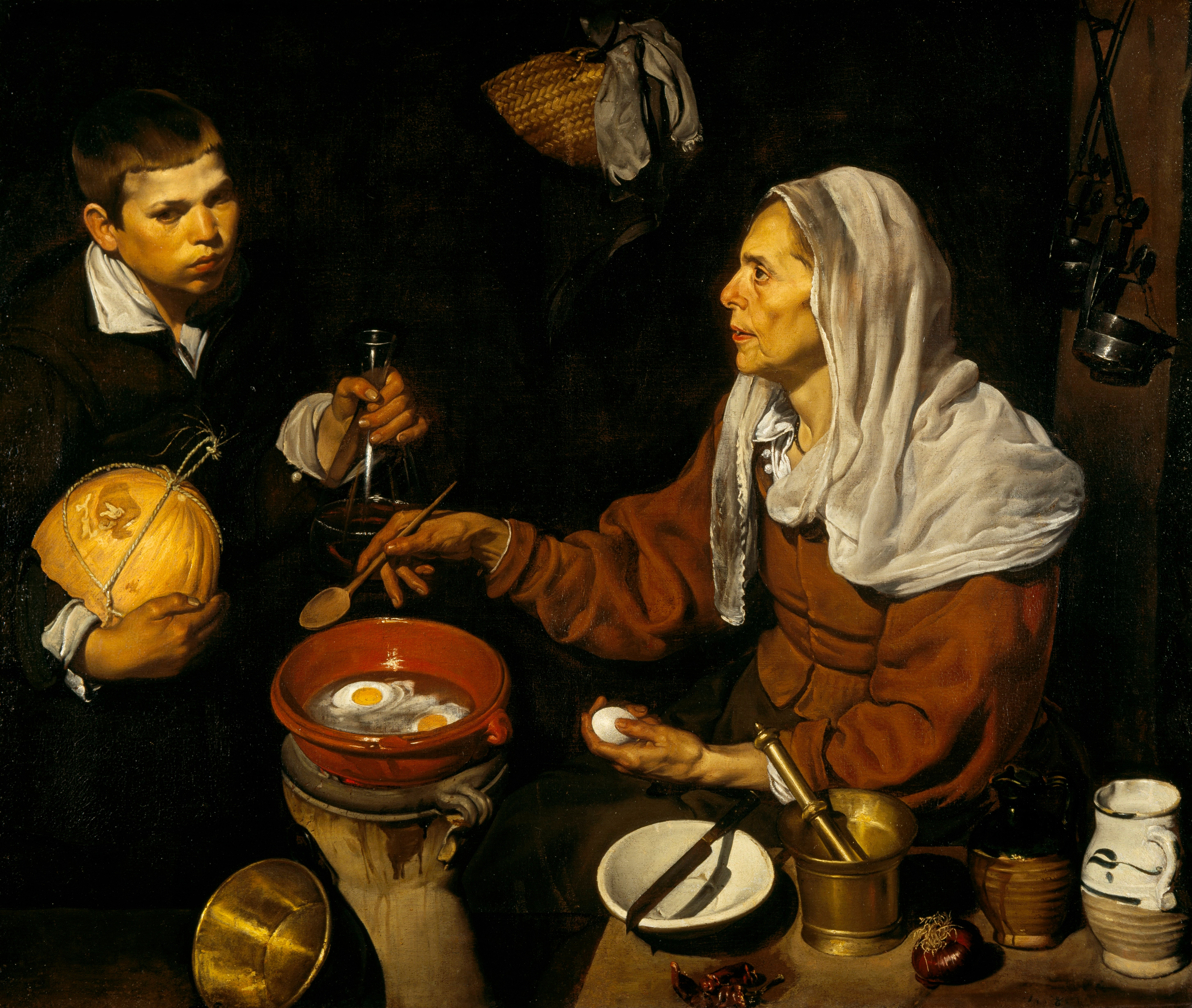
Old Woman Frying Eggs by Diego Velázquez, 1618

In Portugal and Brazil, a runny egg placed over a steak with a side dish of rice and fried potatoes (and the addition of black beans in Brazil) is called a bife a cavalo, literally "horse-riding steak".

A similar dish, with the name bife a caballo in Spanish, is also common in Argentina, Ecuador, and Uruguay (called churrasco); fried potatoes and salad replace the beans and rice.

In Colombia's bandeja paisa the egg is accompanied with avocado and chorizo.

In Chile and Peru, a fried egg is included in Lomo a lo Pobre, Chorrillana, Paila de huevo, and several other dishes.

In Ecuador, llapingachos include a sunny-side up egg served over pan-seared cheesy mashed potatoes and fried sausage.

In northern Mexico, huevos montados (riding eggs) are served with refried beans and fried potatoes (or french fries). Another common method of serving eggs in Mexico is huevos a la mexicana, which blends fried eggs with diced tomato, onion, and green chili pepper; the amount of pepper added is often to order.

There are several other egg dishes in Mexico which combine different ingredients: Huevos motuleños (in Yucatán), aporreados (mixed with refried beans), and huevos rancheros (sunny side up eggs served over a corn tortilla, covered with spicy salsa). Also, in some parts of Mexico, fried eggs are served with fresh tomato, onions, and cilantro salsa. Red chili is optional, as is a blended sauce.

In Spain fried eggs (huevos fritos) are a common dish. They are eaten alone, with meat, or with sausages. In this country, a fried egg served with boiled rice covered in tomato sauce is called arroz a la cubana in Spanish and the same dish is served in parts of Latin America, Italy (so-called occhio di bue, transl. ox's eye), the Philippines, and Portugal as well.

Poet Nâzım Hikmet said in an interview that he stayed with a Spanish friend for a month and ate fried eggs almost every day.

=== Malaysia and Singapore ===
Just as in Indonesia, nasi goreng is a popular fried rice dish in Malaysia and Singapore and is often served with a fried egg.

=== Netherlands ===
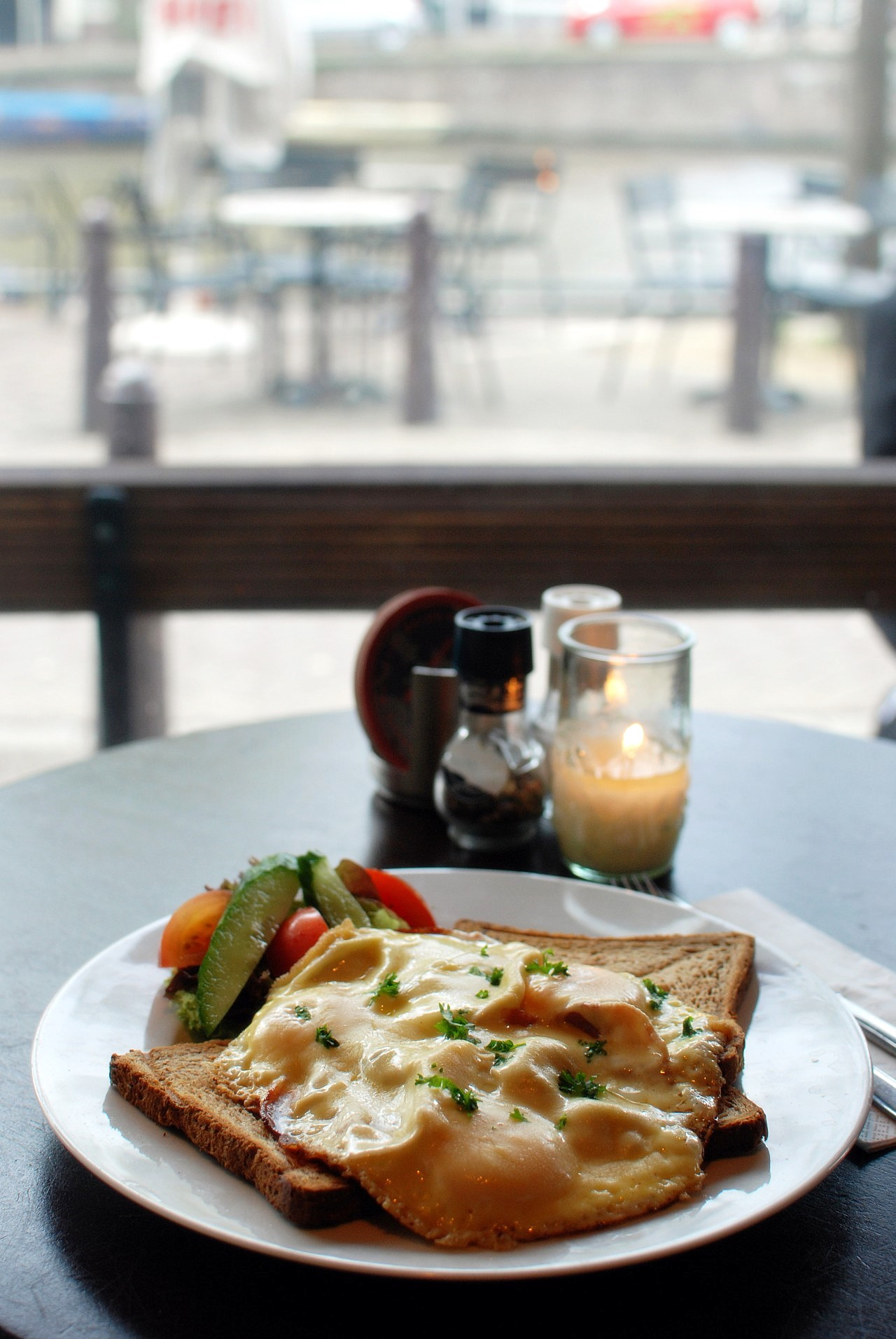
A Dutch uitsmijter spek en kaas: fried eggs with bacon and cheese

In the Netherlands, a fried egg (spiegelei) is normally served on top of a slice of bread (white or whole wheat), often with fried bacon, for breakfast or lunch.

An Uitsmijter is a dish consisting of two or three fried eggs, sunny side up. One version is fried together with ham and cheese (uitsmijter ham en kaas), or bacon and cheese (uitsmijter spek en kaas). Another version is placed on buttered bread over a generous slice of cold meat, e.g., cooked ham or beef, similar to the German Strammer Max. It is a common lunch dish served in many cafes, canteens, and lunch rooms in the Netherlands. Uitsmijter, which literally means "out-thrower", is also a Dutch word for a bouncer.

=== Nigeria ===
What is known as "scrambled eggs" in the US and UK is called "fried eggs" in Nigeria, while what is known as "fried eggs" in the US and UK would be known as "half-fried eggs" in Nigeria. The mai shai stalls cook scrambled eggs to the point of being heavily crisp.

=== Philippines ===
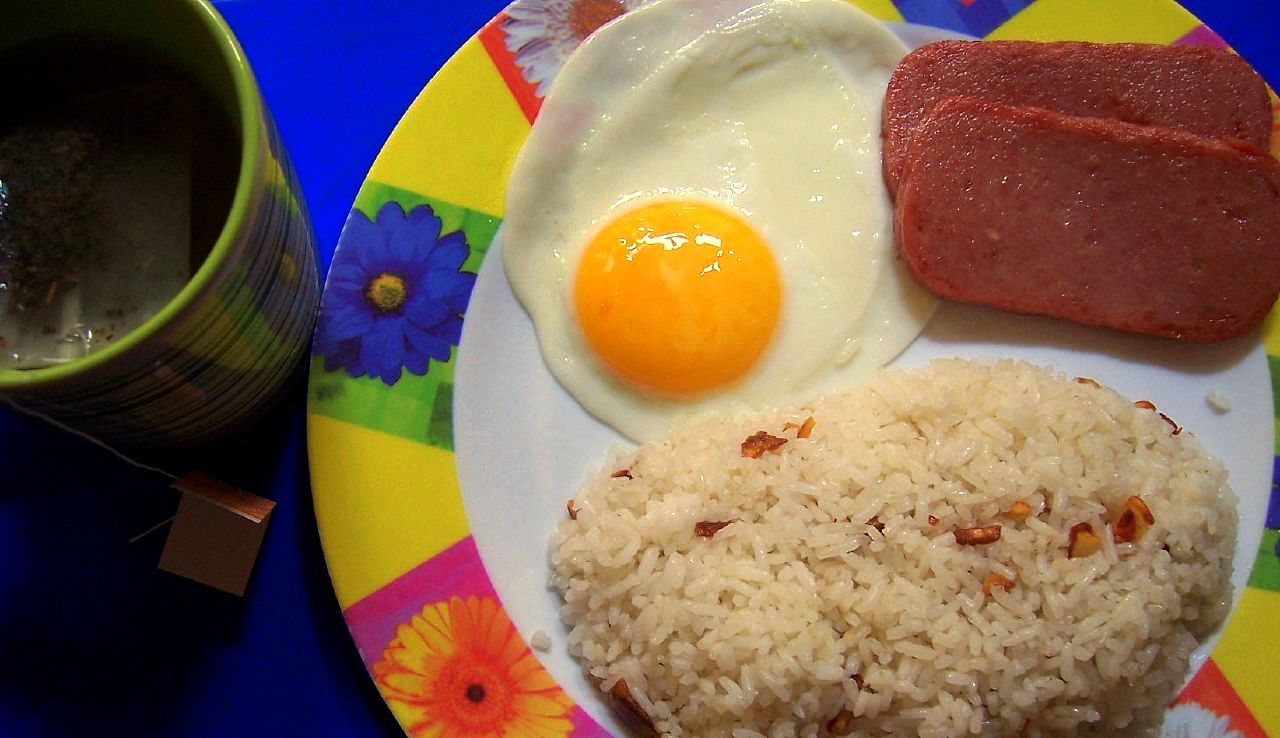
Fried Spam with rice and eggs is a common meal in the Philippines.

In the Philippines, fried eggs are often cooked like a sunny-side egg but the yolk is half cooked - referred to as malasado (from the Spanish, meaning undercooked) - by sprinkling it with salt and oil while being fried, giving it a distinctive pink-colored membrane. Garlic rice (sinangag) with an egg (itlog) is a common combination known as silog, usually served with a choice of breakfast meat such as beef tapa to make it tapsilog, longaniza (longsilog), fried milkfish, dried fish, tocino (caramelised pork), Spam, or corned beef, etc. In addition, fried eggs are eaten in a dish called Arroz a la cubana, which is seasoned ground beef with raisins, cubed potatoes, tomato sauce, and olives, along with white rice and fried ripe plantains. Fried eggs are also a main ingredient in the noodle dish Pancit Batil Patong, where a fried egg is topped over stir-fried noodles.

=== Thailand ===
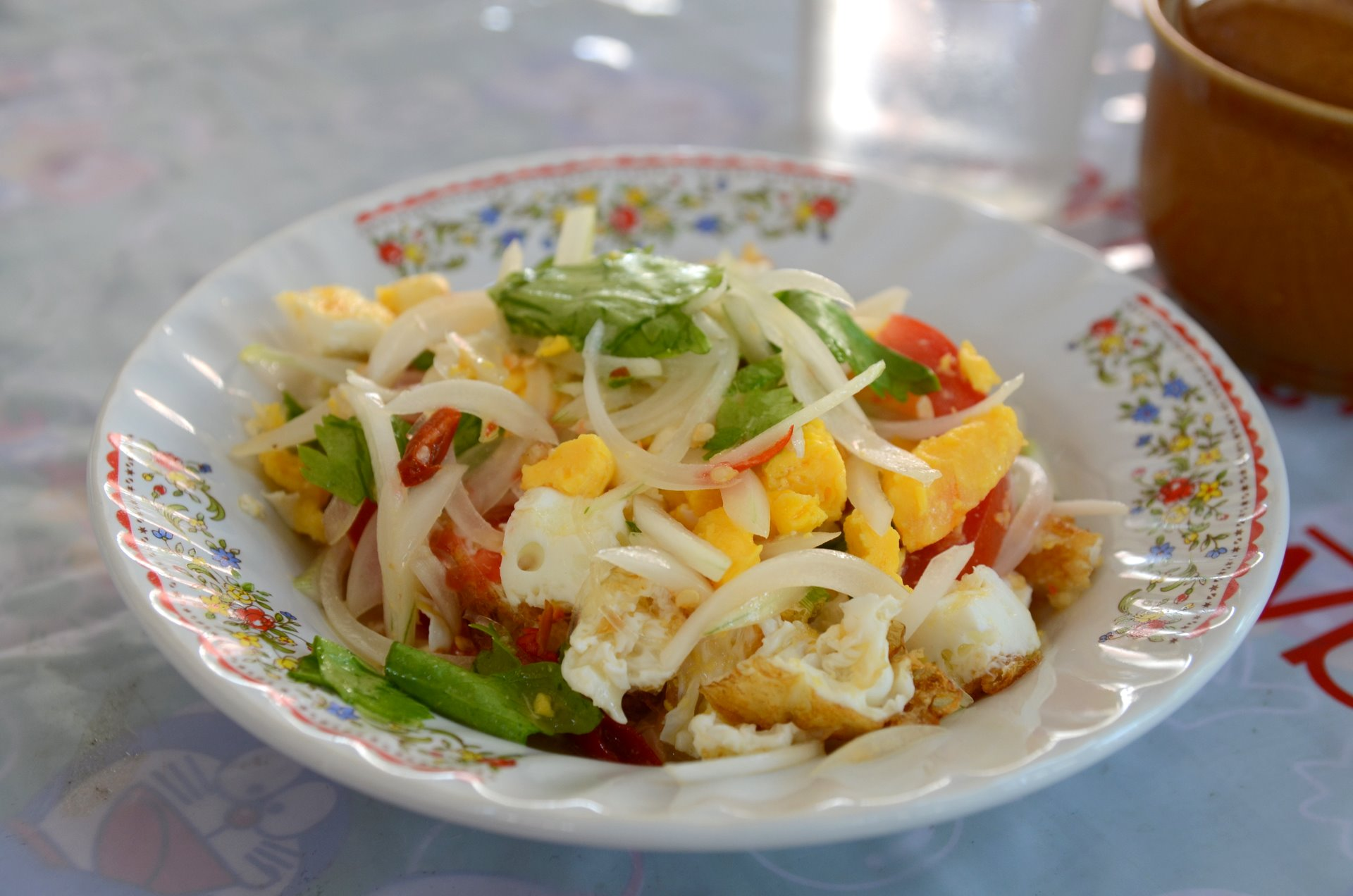
Yam khai dao: A spicy and sour Thai salad made with crispy fried eggs

In Thai cuisine, when the words khai dao (lit. "star egg") are placed after the name of a dish, it means that one wants that dish accompanied by a fried egg. The very popular kaphrao mu rat khao khai dao for instance, translates to "basil fried pork on top of rice with a fried egg". Sometimes this is referred to as a "top egg". Fried rice is also popularly accompanied with a fried egg, such as with khao phat Amerikan and khao phat (standard Thai-style fried rice). Another popular way of eating fried eggs in Thailand is to use it as the main ingredient of the Thai salad called Yam khai dao.

=== United States and Canada ===
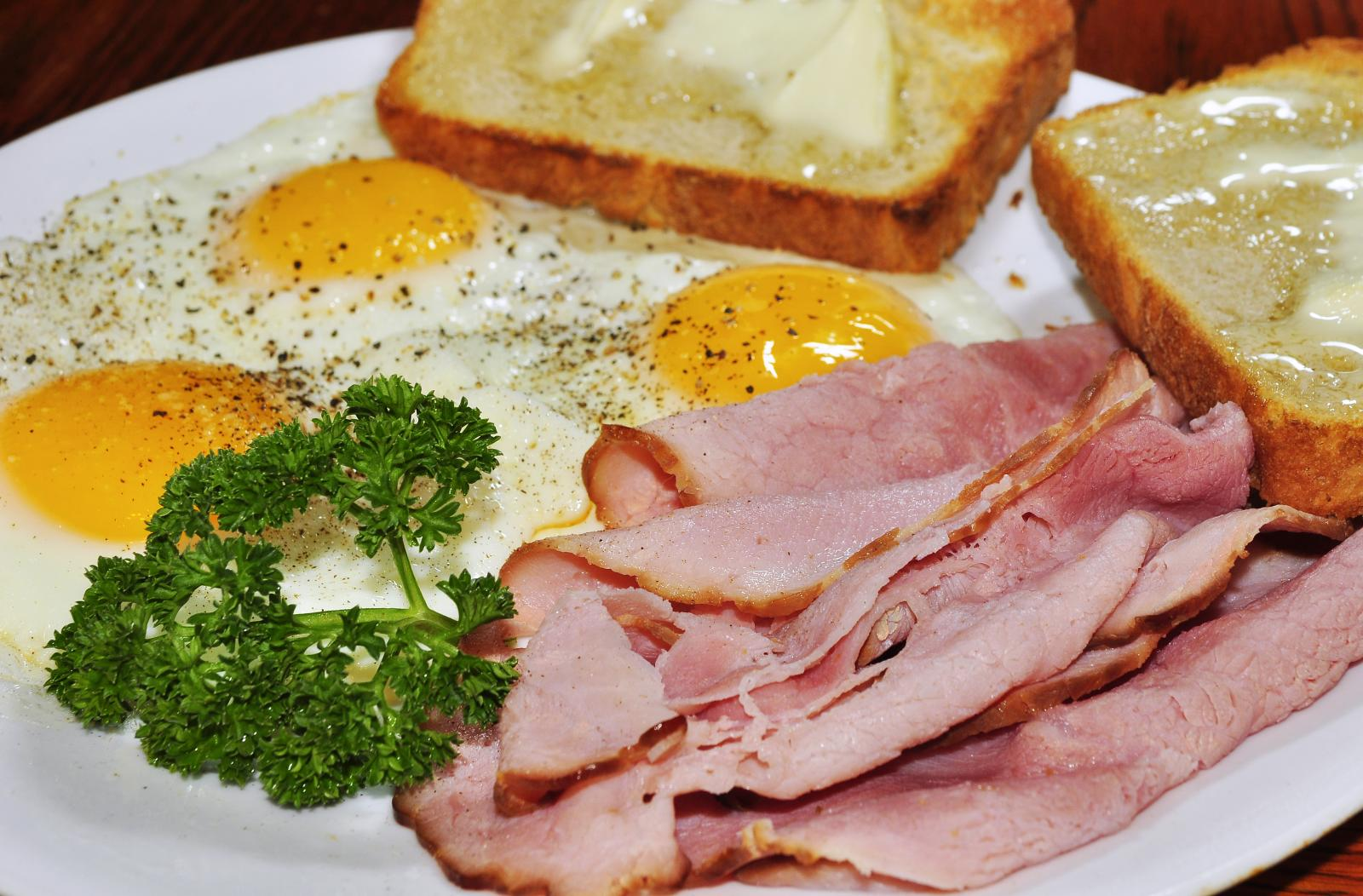
Ham and eggs served with fried eggs prepared "sunny side up"

In both the United States and Canada, the term 'fried egg' is an umbrella term which can refer to multiple ways in which an egg can be fried. Using over-easy as an example, they may be ordered either as 'over-easy eggs' or as 'eggs, over-easy' to denote the kind desired.

==== Over-easy/Dippy egg ====
Over-easy refers to eggs which have one side which has had most of its whites fried, while the other side has only been lightly fried, leaving the yolk unbroken and runny. In the state of Pennsylvania, these are commonly known as 'dippy eggs', in reference to the fact that they are often eaten by dipping toast into the yolks of the egg.

==== Over-medium ====
Over-medium refers to eggs which have their whites fried on both sides, but have yolks which are soft but not runny.

==== Over-hard ====
Over-hard refers to eggs which have been fully cooked on both sides, with a yolk which is solid but intact.

==== Sunny-side up ====
Sunny-side up refers to eggs which have only been fried on one side, not being flipped at all, leaving a completely intact and soft yolk on top.

=== United States ===
In the US, a fried egg (over-easy) is served over with light top, topped with a dab of butter or jam; Fried eggs are also sometimes used in a skillets like the corned hash skillet

== Egg in the basket ==
The name "toad in the hole" is sometimes used for this dish, particularly in the U.S., though that name more commonly refers to sausages cooked in Yorkshire pudding batter. This dish is usually made by cutting a circle or other shape out of a slice of bread, often using a drinking glass or biscuit cutter. The bread is fried until brown on one side and then flipped, and an egg is broken into the center and seasoned, usually with salt and pepper, and sometimes herbs. The pan is then covered, and the egg is cooked until the white is just set. The cutout center of the bread is often fried as well and served alongside or on top of the finished egg.

== See also ==
- Deep fried egg
- Egg sandwich
- Green Eggs and Ham
- List of egg dishes
