= Strammer Max =

Traditional name applied to various sandwich dishes in German cuisine

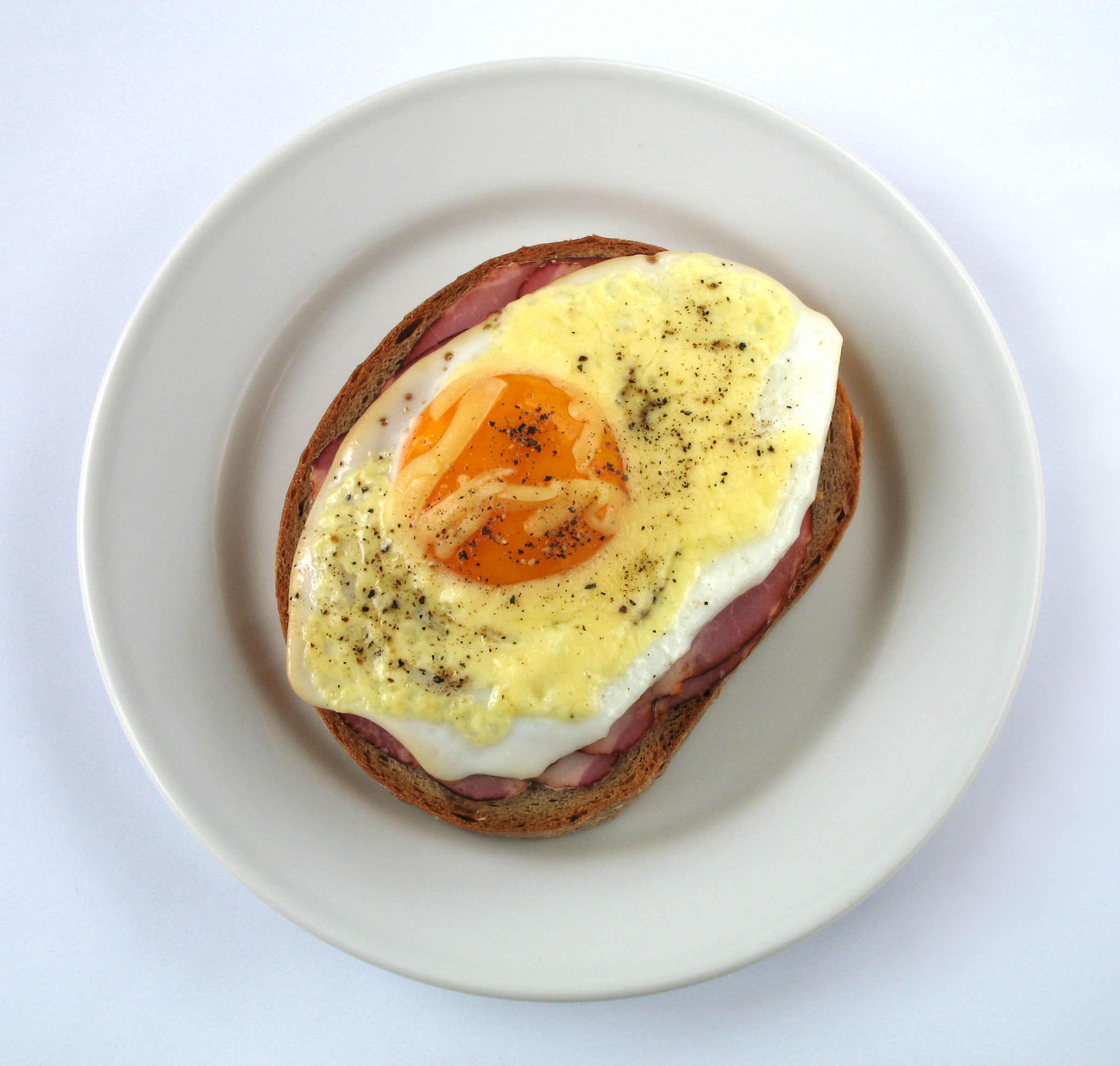
A Strammer Max with cheese

Strammer Max (German pronunciation: [ˌʃtʁamɐ ˈmaks]; English: roughly "Strapping Max") is a sandwich dish in German cuisine.

== German dish ==
The original Strammer Max is a slice of bread, sometimes fried in butter, covered with ham and fried egg. The ham may also be pan-fried; it is also possible to replace the ham with a slice of roast beef, in which case the dish is sometimes called Strammer Otto. Cheese and tomato are sometimes used, but these are later additions to the original recipe.

Outside of the Berlin region, the term is also used for several other dishes. Regional variations of the term are not set in stone, and it is not always possible to tell in advance what dish will be served after ordering Strammer Max in a restaurant.

In Bavaria, a Strammer Max is usually a slice of Leberkäse accompanied by fried egg and potato salad.

== Dutch uitsmijter ==
In the Netherlands and Belgium, the equivalent dish is known as an Uitsmijter, pronounced [ˈœytsmɛitər], which is also the Dutch word for a door bouncer. The uitsmijter most traditionally uses a minimum of two eggs, white bread and a Dutch cheese such as Gouda, in place of the Strammer Max's single egg, rye bread and either Tilsiter or Swiss cheese respectively.
