= Steak and eggs =

American breakfast dish

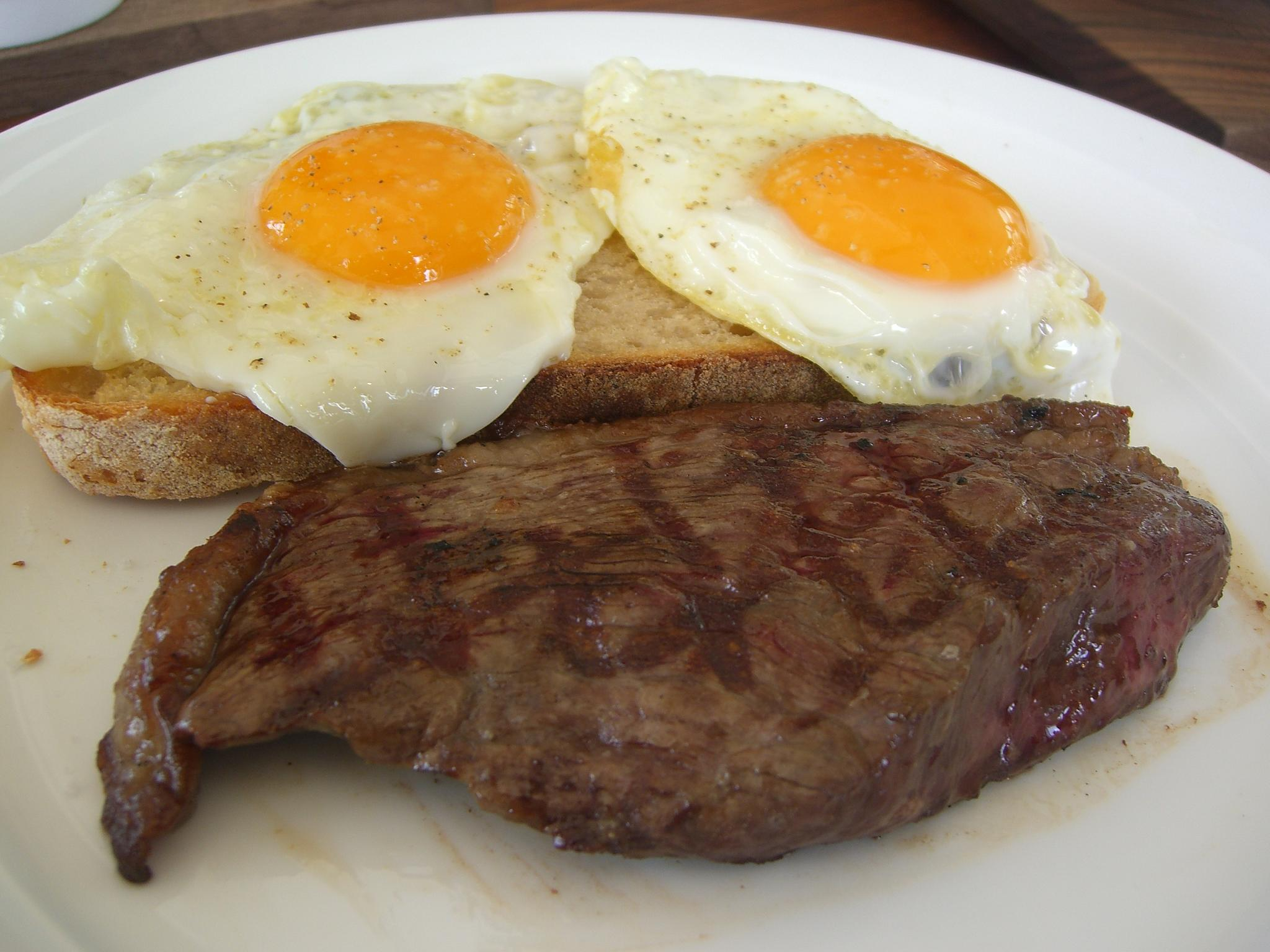
- Course: Breakfast brunch and dinner
- Place of origin: Australia
- Serving temperature: Hot
- Main ingredients: beefsteak and eggs

Steak and eggs is a dish of beefsteak and fried eggs. It is most typically served as a breakfast or brunch food.

== History ==
Steak and eggs emerged as an Australian breakfast by the 1880s.

== Ingredients ==
Various types of beefsteaks can be used, such as ribeye, strip, sirloin and flank, among others. Additional ingredients may include capsicum, garlic, onion, butter, salt, pepper, hot sauce, and other seasonings or condiments. Accompaniments may include various sauces, such as steak sauce, Worcestershire sauce, chimichurri and others.

== Variations ==
Variations include steak and egg sandwiches, open sandwiches and steak and Eggs Benedict. A version of steak and egg salad uses greens such as arugula, poached eggs and steak. In the northeastern part of the United States, New York, Jersey, and Connecticut, delis with flat-top grills that specify in making breakfast sandwiches will also use beef and forms of beef bacon to create beef and egg sandwiches.

A steak and egg sandwich with bacon and cheddar cheese

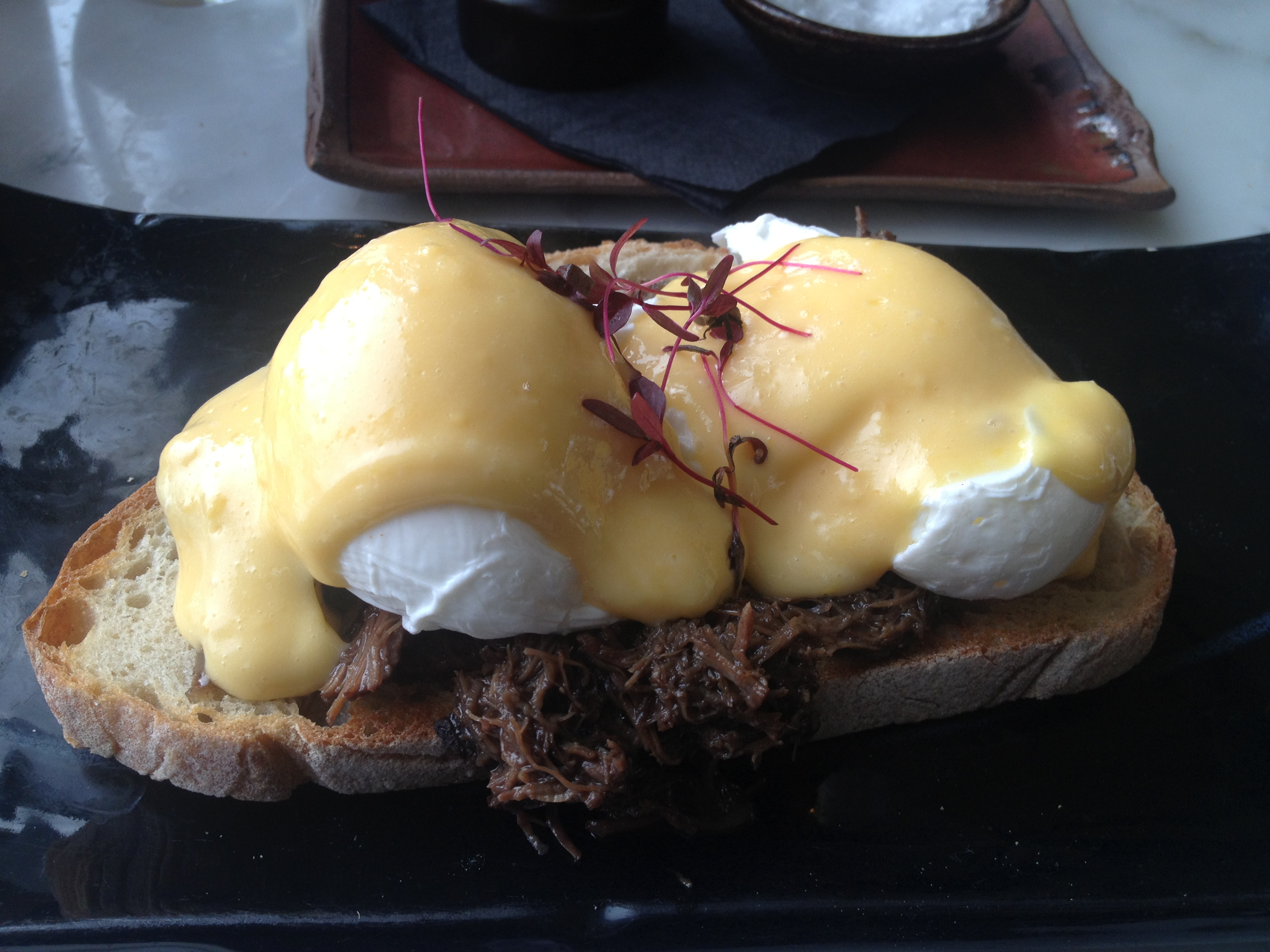
An open sandwich prepared with steak and eggs

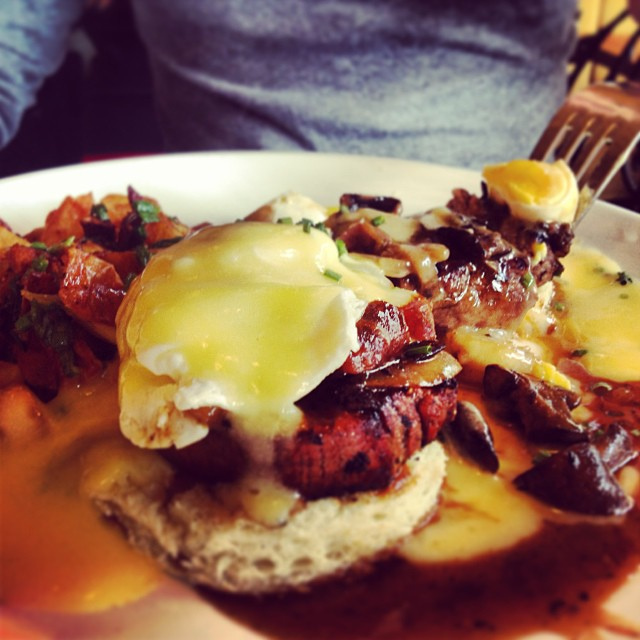
Steak and Eggs Benedict

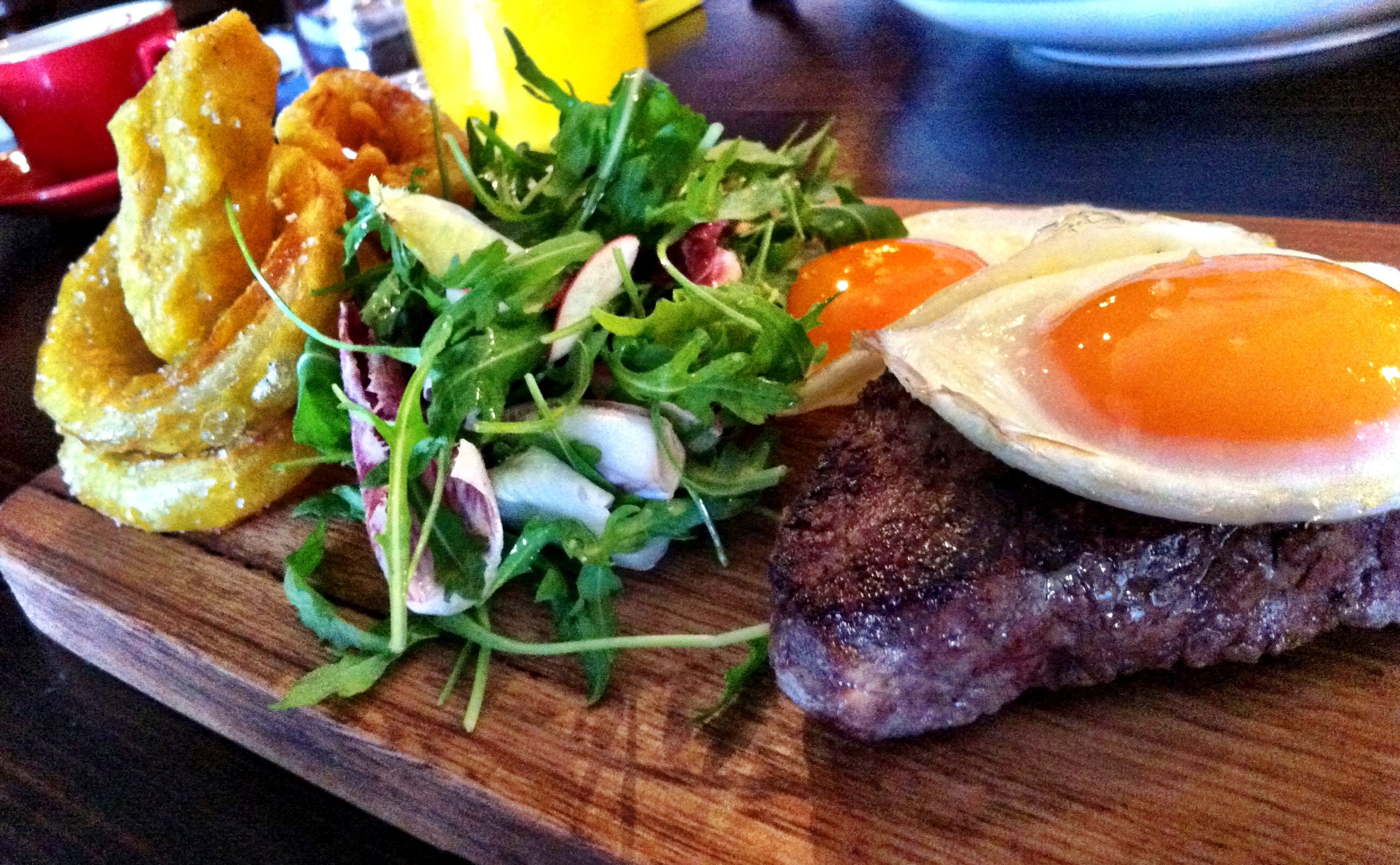
Steak and eggs at a restaurant, with salad and onion rings

== In culture ==
Steak and eggs is the traditional breakfast served to NASA astronauts before a launch. The tradition was established after Alan Shepard had steak and eggs for breakfast the morning before his flight on May 5, 1961.

Steak and eggs are popular amongst bodybuilders.

The meal is also the customary pre-landing breakfast of the United States Marine Corps.

== See also ==
- List of beef dishes
- List of egg dishes
- List of steak dishes
- Lomo a lo pobre
