= Uitsmijter =

Dutch and Belgian lunch dish

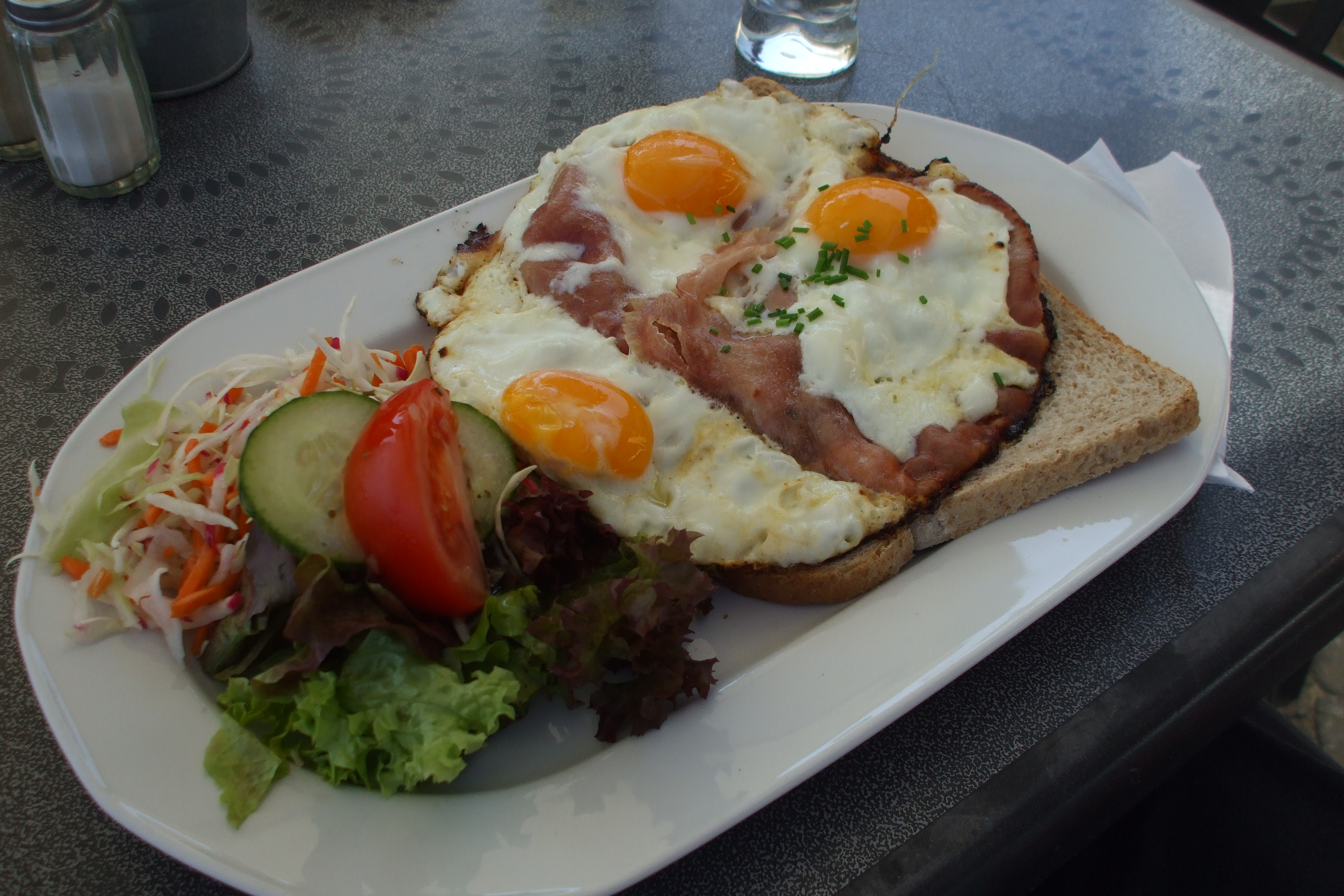
Uitsmijter

The uitsmijter pronounced [ˈœytsmɛitər], is a classic Dutch and Belgian lunch dish consisting of at least two fried eggs served on slices of white bread, typically topped with ham and Gouda cheese.

== Lexicalization and global context ==
The combination of a sandwich with cold cuts and/or cheese with a fried egg on top is consumed globally, mostly under descriptive names, such as the English "ham and fried eggs on toast". However, in only a few linguistic regions has this specific preparation become idiomatized. In the Dutch-speaking world, this is the uitsmijter, whereas in German-speaking contexts and in France a similar preparation is known as Strammer Max and croque-madame respectively.

== Etymology and history ==
The name of the dish literally translates to "one who throws out" (a bouncer). The name originated in the Amsterdam hospitality scene at the end of the 19th century. It was a dish traditionally served in cafés and taverns just before guests were asked to leave at closing time. Customers were literally served a meal before being "thrown out" (uitgesmeten). The earliest known written record dates back to 1899. In German Strammer Max has existed since around 1920.

== See also ==
Dutch cuisine
