= Deep-fried egg =

Dish consisting of an egg that has been deep-fried

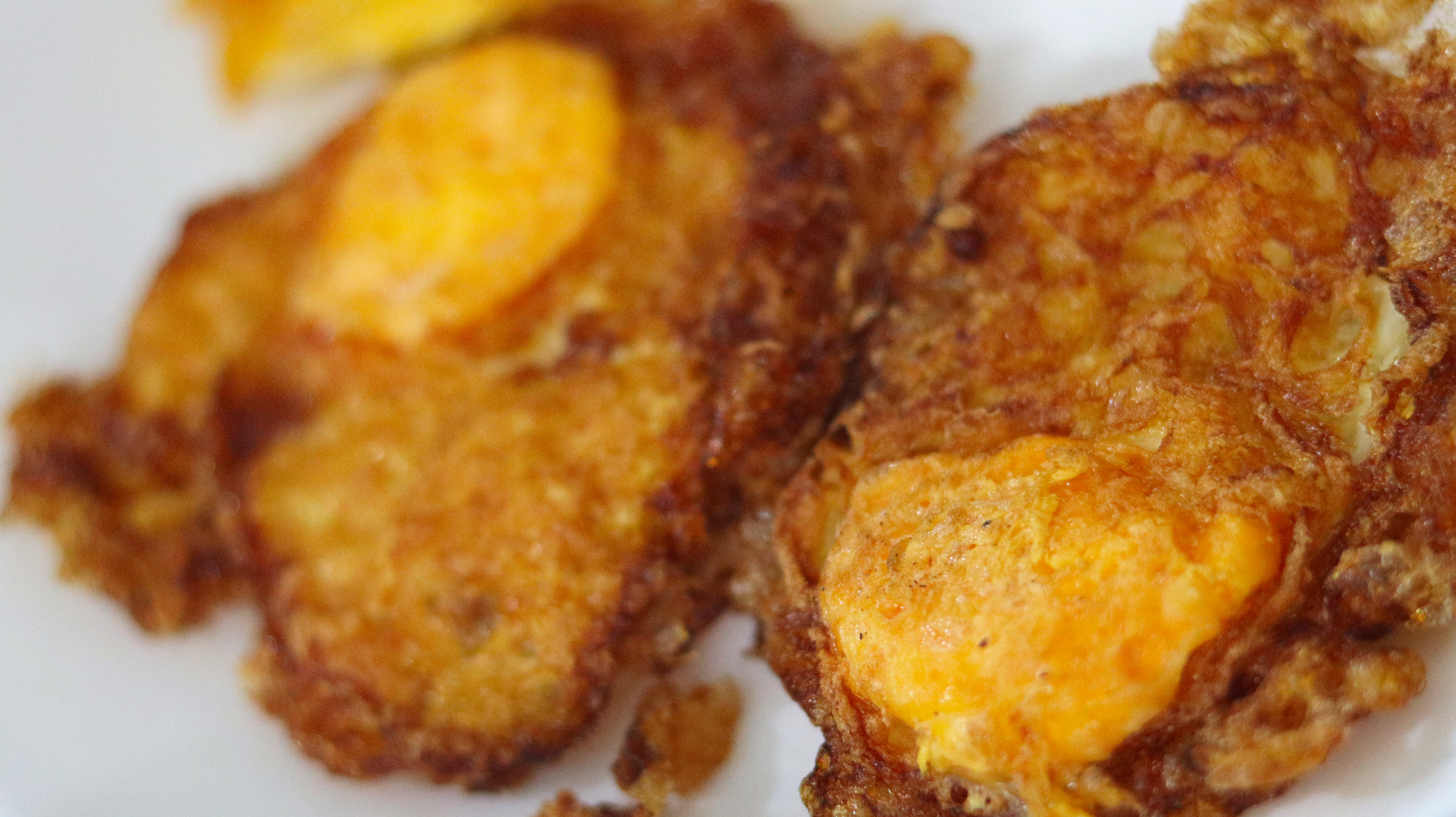
Homemade deep-fried eggs

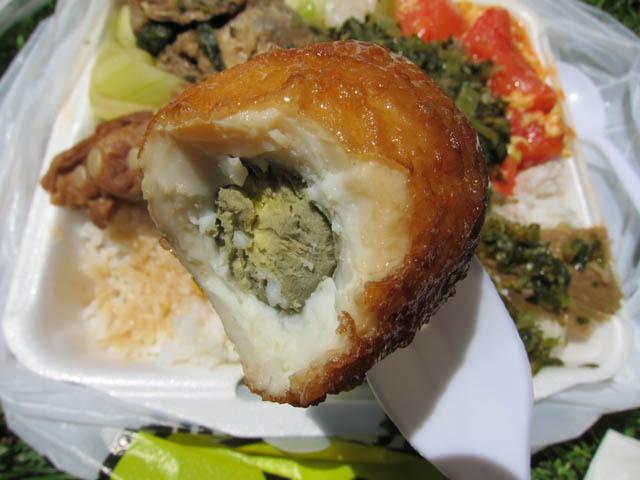
A deep-fried hard-boiled egg

A deep-fried egg is an egg dish consisting of an egg that has been deep-fried. Sometimes the dish is prepared only using the egg yolk, which is referred to as deep-fried egg yolk. Various types of eggs can be used, such as chicken, duck and quail eggs. The dish is sometimes served alone, and is also used as an ingredient for various dishes. Sometimes also pre-cooked eggs are breaded and deep fried.

== Overview ==
A typical deep fried egg preparation is to crack the eggs directly into a container of heated cooking oil and then continuously spooning the egg white around the yolk to keep the yolk covered. Another method involves using two cooking spoons to continuously roll the egg in the oil after the egg white spooning process, which can assist in creating a consistent shape and coloration. As the egg cooks, the egg white transforms into a crunchy, hardened crust that surrounds the egg yolk. It is sometimes seasoned, such as with salt and pepper.

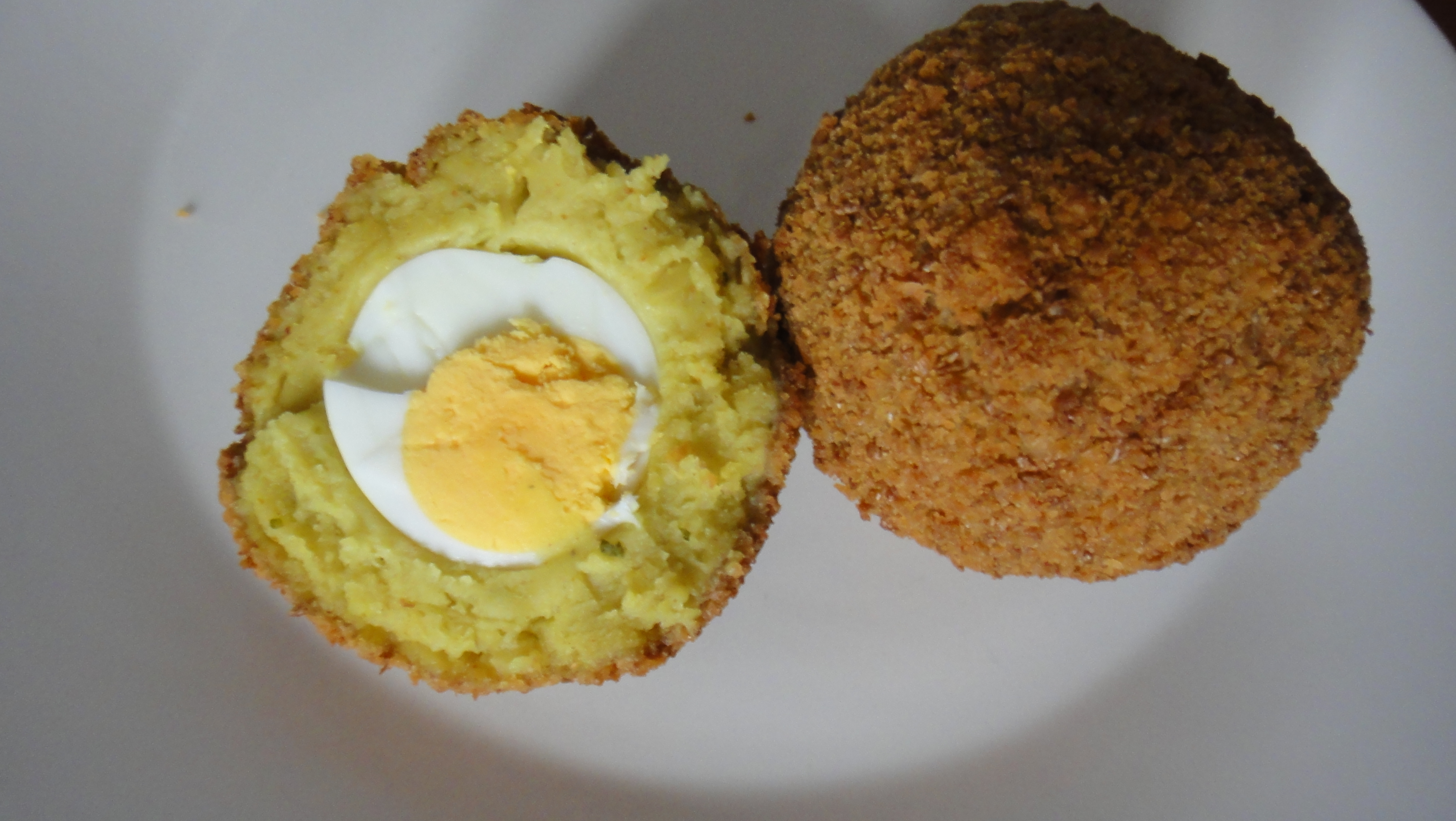
A halved vegetarian Scotch egg with mashed potato rather than traditional minced meat

Deep fried egg yolk is sometimes prepared using breading on the yolk, which is then deep fried. When breaded, the surface of the dish is crunchy, and the interior can be molten, soft and creamy. This is sometimes served as an appetizer.

Using pre-cooked eggs, such as poached or boiled eggs, they also sometimes are coated in breading before the deep frying.

All variants can be either served as a meal in its own right or used as an ingredient or side dish, e.g. as topping on a salad.

== Deep-fried egg dishes ==
Deep-fried eggs are an ingredient in the Indonesian dish balado tahu telor, which consists of deep-fried eggs, deep-fried tofu, and chili peppers.

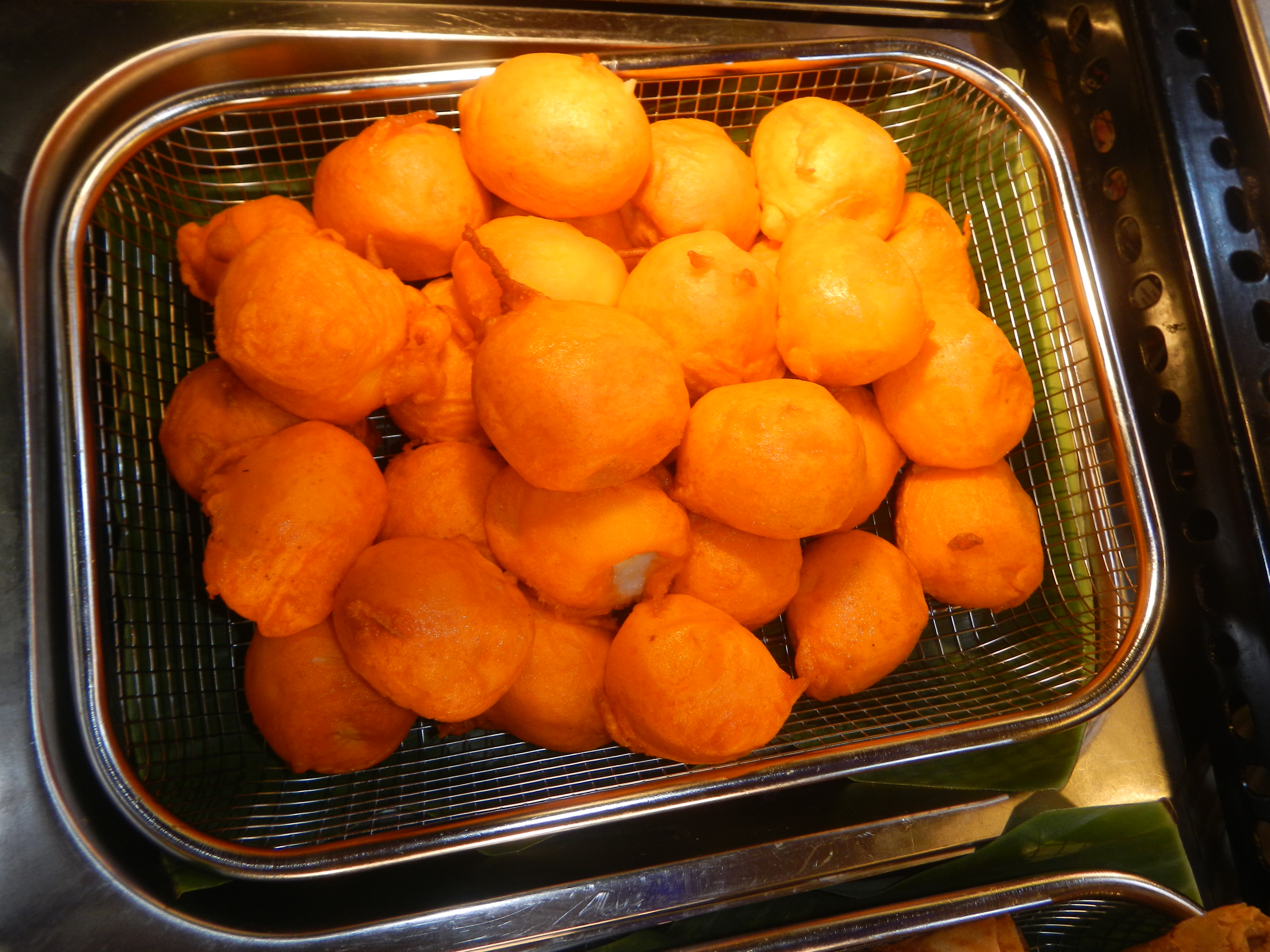
Kwek-kwek is prepared using quail eggs.

The deep-fried egg is a popular dish in Asia. Tokneneng is a tempura-like Filipino street food made by deep-frying hard-boiled chicken or duck eggs covered in a batter that has been colored orange with annatto. Kwek-kwek is a Filipino street food consisting of orange-battered deep-fried quail eggs.

Balut (the developing embryo) may also be boiled with the shell on and then deep-fried. It is sometimes served on a stick in the Philippines.

Son-in-law eggs (Thai: kai look keuy) is a Thai dish prepared using deep-fried hard-boiled eggs and a sweet and sour caramel sauce. It is a relatively common street food in Thailand. In Thai folklore, some sources state (Note: "As the story goes (and, like most stories of this type, its origins and authenticity are often disputed)...") that the dish is served as a warning to a mother's son-in-law who is mistreating his wife, or as a warning to a future son-in-law to not mistreat his wife, in which the dish is served to the son-in-law, with the eggs symbolically representing fried testicles. (Note: "The Thai word for egg (as in eggs laid by the female in various species) is the same as the informal word for the male reproductive glands that come in pairs.")

Prepared deviled eggs can be deep-fried and served hot, too.

== Hazards ==
Preparation of this dish can be dangerous, because when raw cracked eggs are dropped into hot oil, the oil can significantly erupt and splatter onto the cook or onto a hot stove burner, causing serious burns and potentially starting a fire. Using pre-cooked poached eggs that are well-drained of water can be a safer means of preparation.

== See also ==
- List of deep fried foods
- List of egg dishes
- Fried egg – Cooked dish made from one or more eggs
- Scotch egg – Boiled egg wrapped in sausage meat
