= Lomo a lo pobre =

Peruvian beef tenderloin dish

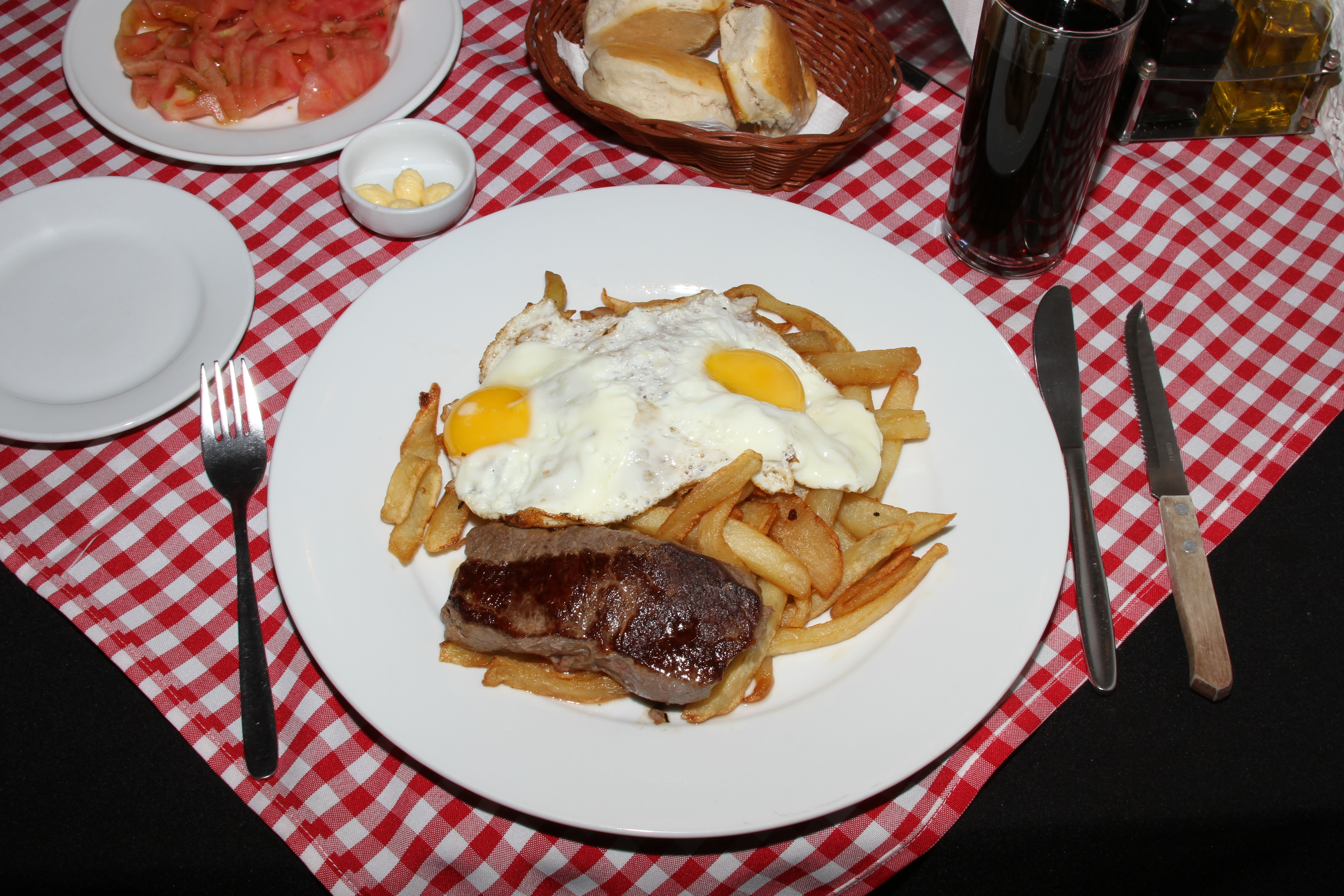
- Lomo a lo pobre at a restaurant in Santiago, Chile. The onions are served underneath the eggs and are not visible in the photograph.
- Course: Main (lunch)
- Place of origin: Chile
- Serving temperature: Hot
- Main ingredients: Beef, eggs, french fries
- Ingredients generally used: Fried onions, rice, fried plantains
- Variations: Bistec a lo pobre, bife a lo pobre

Lomo a lo pobre, bistec a lo pobre, or bife a lo pobre is a dish from Chile consisting of beef tenderloin (Spanish: lomo) and French fries topped with one or more fried eggs. Unlike steak and eggs, lomo a lo pobre is eaten as a lunch or dinner.

There are variants that replace steak with other types of meat, such as beef tenderloin or fillet, chicken, or fish such as conger eel, salmon, or hake.

== Etymology in Perú ==
There are several possible origins for the term a lo pobre ("poor man's style").

One is that it was named because of the irony of nineteenth-century Peruvian common folk eating similar dishes with an abundance of food and at a high price, despite their economic situation.

Alternatively, it may have originated due to the idea that poorer residents of Lima ate meat combined with carbohydrates, eggs, and rice, while higher-class individuals were associated with eating meat alone with a vegetable. Yet another possibility is that it is a derivation from au poivre ("with pepper") even though the preparations are quite different.

Today it is consumed in lower- and upper-class restaurants, and there is no negative connotation associated with the dish.

The term a lo pobre in Lima today may refer simply to the addition of a fried egg and is used in other dishes besides steak, such as grilled chicken breast (pechuga a lo pobre), rice (especially arroz chaufa), lomo saltado, salchipapas, or even hamburgers.

== See also ==
- Bife a cavalo
- Steak and eggs
- List of beef dishes
