= Lomo saltado =

Peruvian stir-fry dish

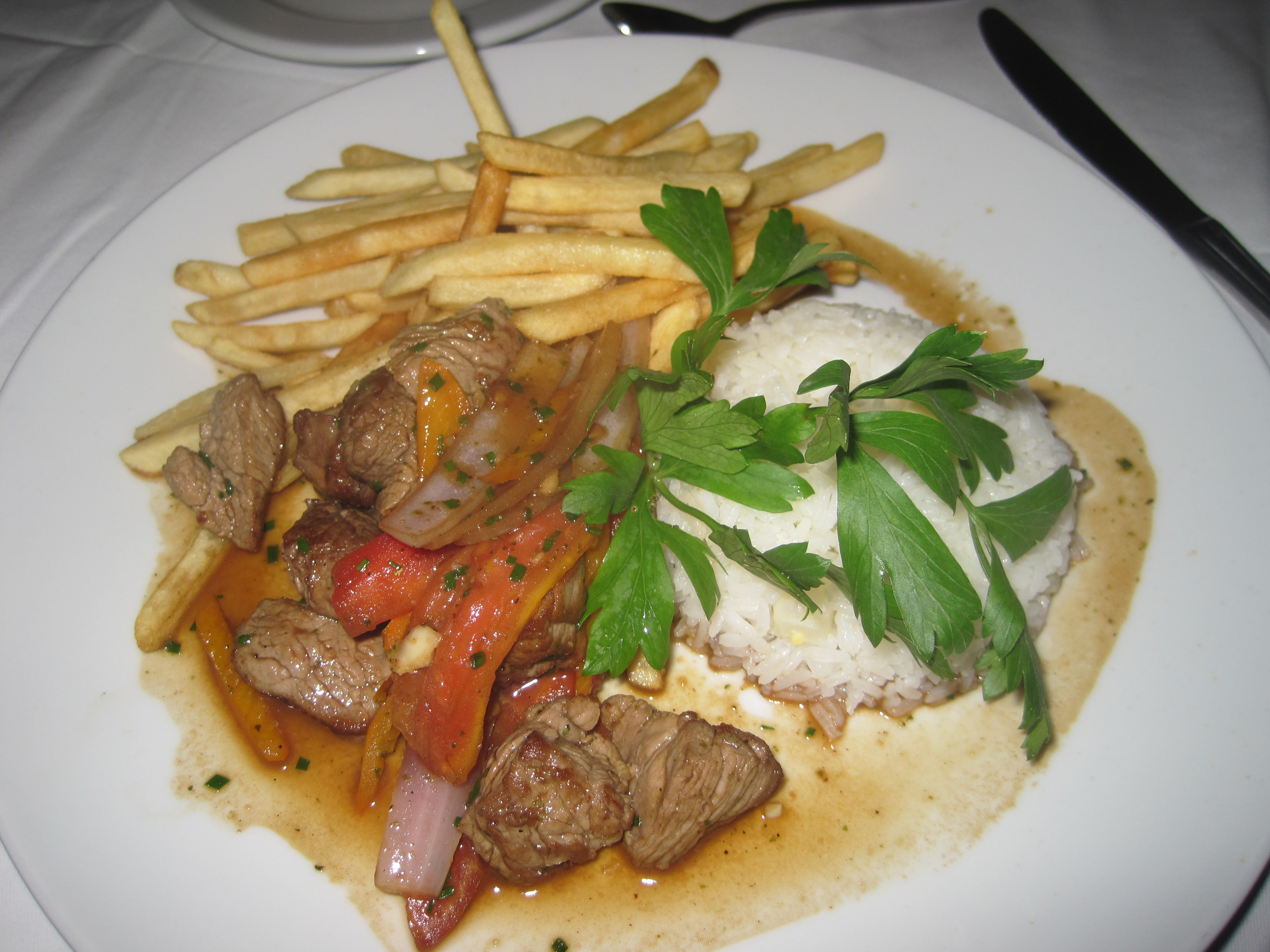
- Lomo saltado with the fries on the side
- Alternative names: Lomito saltado
- Course: Main course
- Place of origin: Peru
- Associated cuisine: Peru
- Created by: Chinese Peruvians
- Serving temperature: Hot
- Main ingredients: Thinly sliced beef steak, onions, tomatoes, french fries, soy sauce, rice, vinegar
- Ingredients generally used: Chili peppers, crema

Lomo saltado is a traditional Peruvian dish, a stir-fry that typically combines marinated strips of sirloin (or other beef steak) with onions, tomatoes, french fries, and other ingredients, and is typically served with rice. The dish originated as part of the chifa tradition, the Chinese cuisine of Peru, though its popularity has made it part of the mainstream culture.

== Description ==
The dish is normally prepared by marinating sirloin strips in vinegar, soy sauce, and spices, then stir frying these with red onions, parsley, tomatoes, and possibly other ingredients. The use of both potatoes (which originated in Peru) and rice (which originated in Asia) as starches is typical of the cultural blending that the dish represents.

In his 2013 article in HuffPost, British-Peruvian chef Martin Morales called lomo saltado "one of Peru's most loved dishes" and said that this dish "shows the rich fusion of old and new worlds. This juicy mixture of beef, onions, tomatoes, ají Amarillo paste and soy sauce sauteed in a large pan (or wok) is one of the many contributions Chinese immigration brought to Peru." He explains, "Lomo Saltado is sometimes known as a Criollo dish but more known as a Peruvian-Chinese dish; a favourite chifa dish. These are its true roots".

In a 2014 video interview for the Peruvian newspaper El Comercio, Peruvian chef Gastón Acurio demonstrates how he makes his version of lomo saltado.

== History ==
According to a 2011 article that was published in the Peruvian newspaper El Comercio, the book Diccionario de la Gastronomía Peruana Tradicional, published in 2009 by Sergio Zapata Acha, includes an old description for lomo saltado, which fails to mention its Asian influence. Although this does not deny the dish's widely accepted Chinese-Peruvian roots, the article's author then ponders the possible relations to similar dishes like lomo de vaca and lomo a la chorrillana.

The word saltado refers to stir fry (salteado in other Spanish-speaking countries, from the French sautée, which means to "jump"), a widely recognized Chinese cooking technique. Hence, saltado dishes are commonly known in Peru to have a Chinese cuisine influence. The same 2011 newspaper article mentions that having a Chinese cook (or servant) was considered a luxury at the time and that years later, after completing their indenture contracts, many Chinese Peruvians opened restaurants that became known as chifa by 1921. A census of Lima in 1613 shows the presence of Chinese (and other Asians) in Peru, mainly as servants (and slaves). Later, large numbers of Chinese immigrant workers arrived between 1849 and 1874, to replace African slave laborers, while Peru was in the process of abolishing slavery.

A 1903 Peruvian cookbook (Nuevo Manual de Cocina a la Criolla) included a short description of lomo saltado, an indication of the assimilation of Chinese cooking technique in Peruvian cuisine. The culinary term saltado is unique to Peru, and did not exist in other Latin countries of that era, nor was it used in any Spanish cuisine terminology. The old cookbook description of the dish is very short, and does not mention soy sauce or other typical Asian ingredients of the dish known today. It also does not mention black pepper, vinegar, or Peruvian chilies. A few critics incorrectly theorized a purely Peruvian origin (without foreign influence) based on this cookbook, which features an assorted variety of regional Peruvian dishes (from Arequipa, Chorrillos, Moquegua, etc.). But this cookbook's list of traditional Peruvian Criollo cuisine includes many dishes with Spanish, Italian, Cuban, Guatemalan, and Chilean origins. The 1903 cookbook is not an all-inclusive list of old Peruvian dishes available in the country, and it does not contradict the Chinese-Peruvian roots of lomo saltado. It serves as an example (reflecting the opinions of its editor) of a variety of dishes that were commonplace in Peru during that era, regardless of origin.

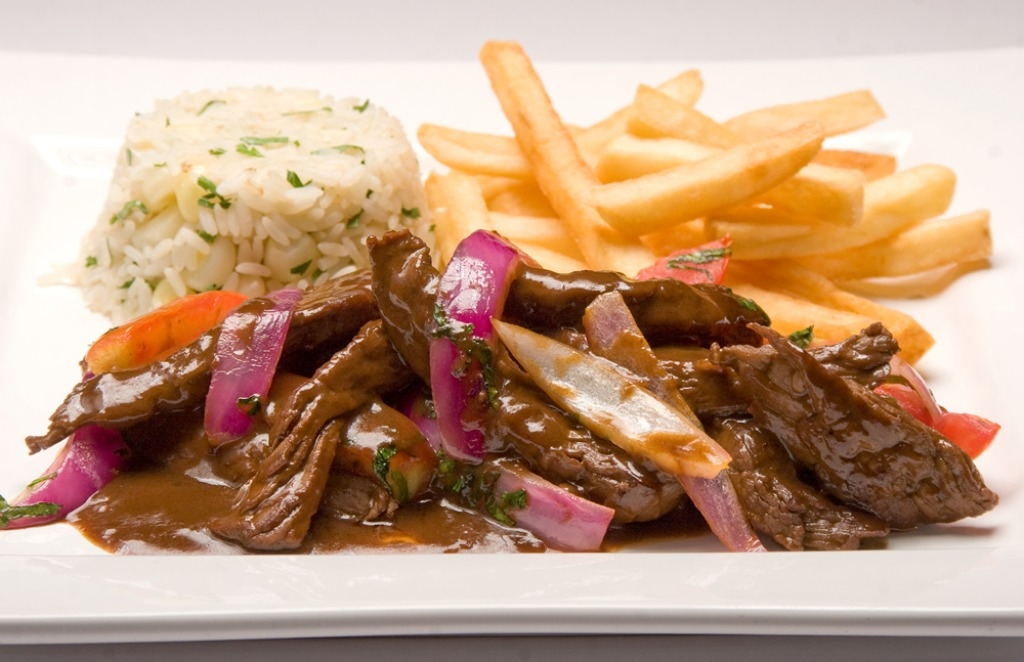
Lomo saltado with onions, tomatoes, french fries and white rice

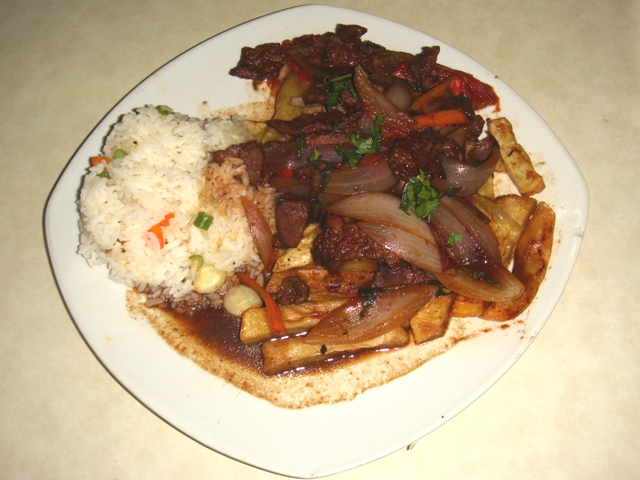
Lomo saltado which typically includes fries within its mixture

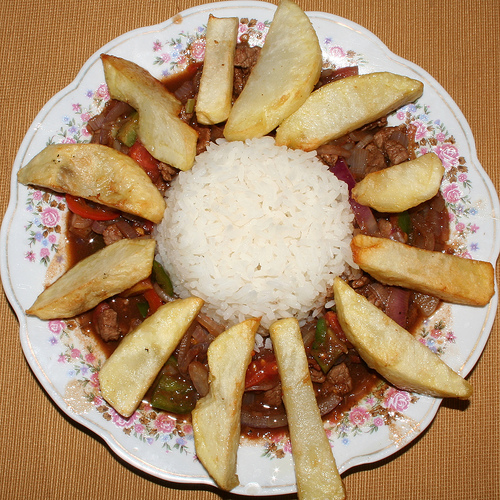
Lomo saltado with fries on top

== See also ==
- List of beef dishes
- Lomo a lo pobre, a Peruvian dish of grilled beef
- Shaking beef, a similar but unrelated dish with roots in French-inspired Vietnamese cuisine
