= Tokneneng =

Filipino street food

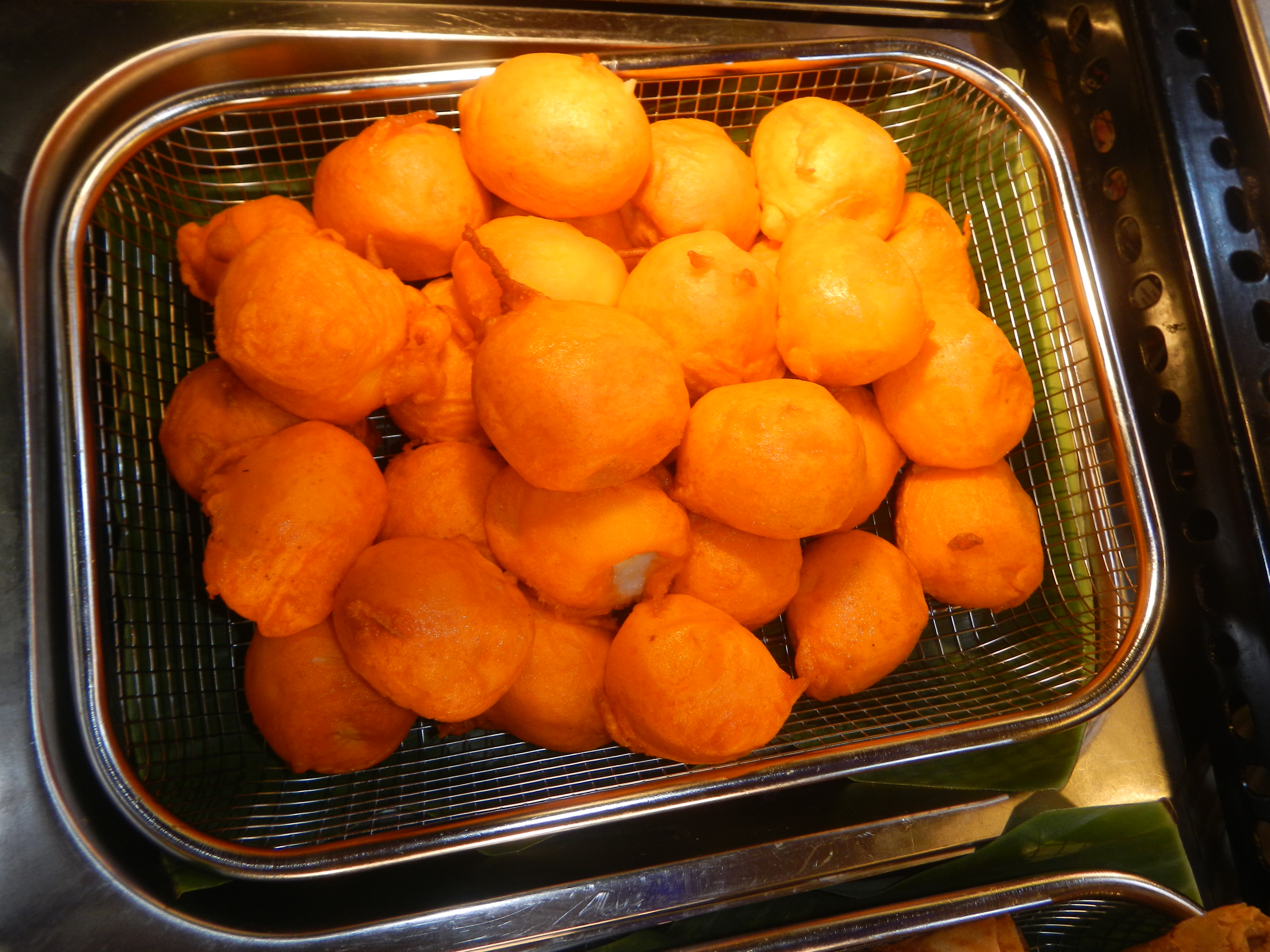
- Kwek kwek or tokneneng made with quail eggs
- Alternative names: Kwek kwek, toknanay, hepalog
- Course: Snack
- Place of origin: Philippines
- Main ingredients: Hard-boiled chicken, duck or quail egg, batter

Tokneneng (or tukneneng) and kwek kwek (or kwek-kwek) are terms for a tempura-like Filipino street food made by deep-frying hard-boiled chicken or duck or quail eggs covered in orange batter. The batter is colored with annatto, locally known as achuete, either in powder form or by annatto seeds that have been soaked in water. To cook the eggs, the cooking oil needs to be at least 160°F (71°C).

Kwek kwek is often used for quail eggs, which are smaller, while tokneneng is used for chicken eggs and duck eggs, but kwek kwek is also used as a generic term for deep fried eggs coated in orange batter, and meanings have somewhat shifted over time as kwek kwek and tokeneneng have been often used interchangeably.

Tokneneng and kwek kwek are commonly found at street food stalls, often with fish balls, squid balls, and kikiam. They are usually served with either a tangy vinegar-based dip (plain or spicy), or a thick sweet sauce made of flour, soy sauce, garlic, onions, and sugar.

== History ==
The word tokneneng originated from the 1978 Pinoy Komiks series Batute, illustrated by Vic Geronimo and created by Rene Villaroman. In the language of the protagonist, Batute, tokneneng means "egg".

The name kwek kwek is said to be in imitation of ducks' quacking, pointing to the term referring to duck eggs originally and not yet exclusively quail eggs.

The name tokneneng also led to the term toknanay, punning on Neneng, a Filipino pet name for a young girl, and nanay, Filipino for mother. Understood thus, toknanay was most likely coined for the larger duck or chicken eggs because tokneneng was being used for the smaller quail eggs.

In Taytay, it is called epalog or hepalog, a portmanteau of hepa (hepatitis) and itlog (egg), referring to the yellowish skin associated with hepatitis.

Battered eggs as Philippine street food is said to have started with a balut vendor in Cubao. Accidentally dropping the balut they were selling, they peeled off the shells and deep-fried it in batter instead of discarding it. (Since balut is made from duck eggs, this points to kwek kwek being used for such, named in imitation of ducks' quacking, before it was used for quail eggs.) Yet another possibility is that street eateries (karinderya) repurpose leftover balut and penoy by deep-frying them for the next day.

== See also ==
- Deep fried egg
- Fish ball
- Kikiam
- Isaw
