= Yam khai dao =

Thai dish made from fried chicken or duck eggs

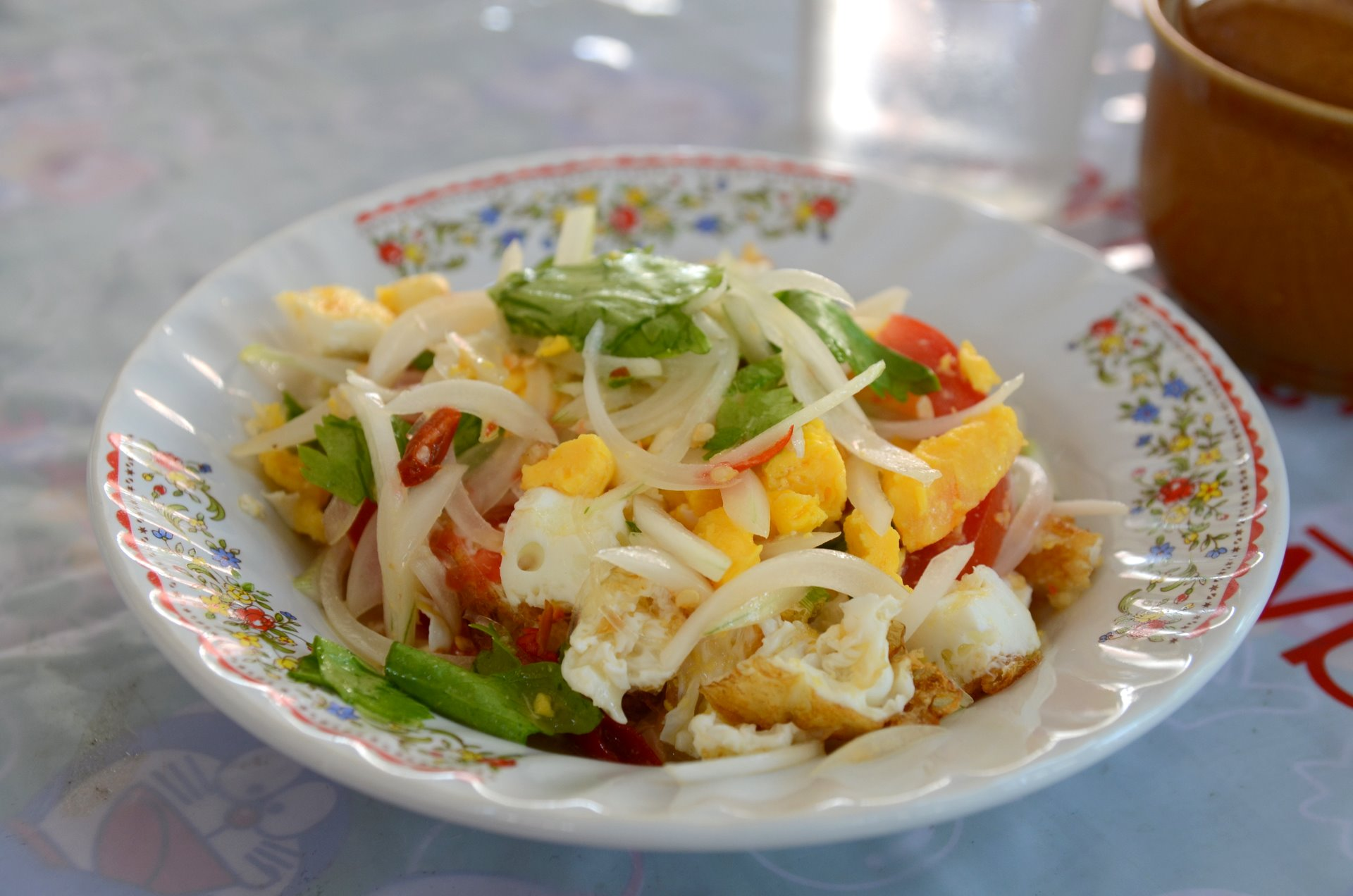
- Place of origin: Thailand
- Region or state: Southeast Asia
- Associated cuisine: Thailand
- Main ingredients: Fried chicken or duck eggs

Yam khai dao (Thai: ยำไข่ดาว, pronounced [jām kʰàj dāːw], "fried-egg spicy salad") is a Thai dish of fried chicken or duck eggs. It is easy to prepare and is usually not sold in restaurants.
