= Shaking beef =

French-inspired Vietnamese dish

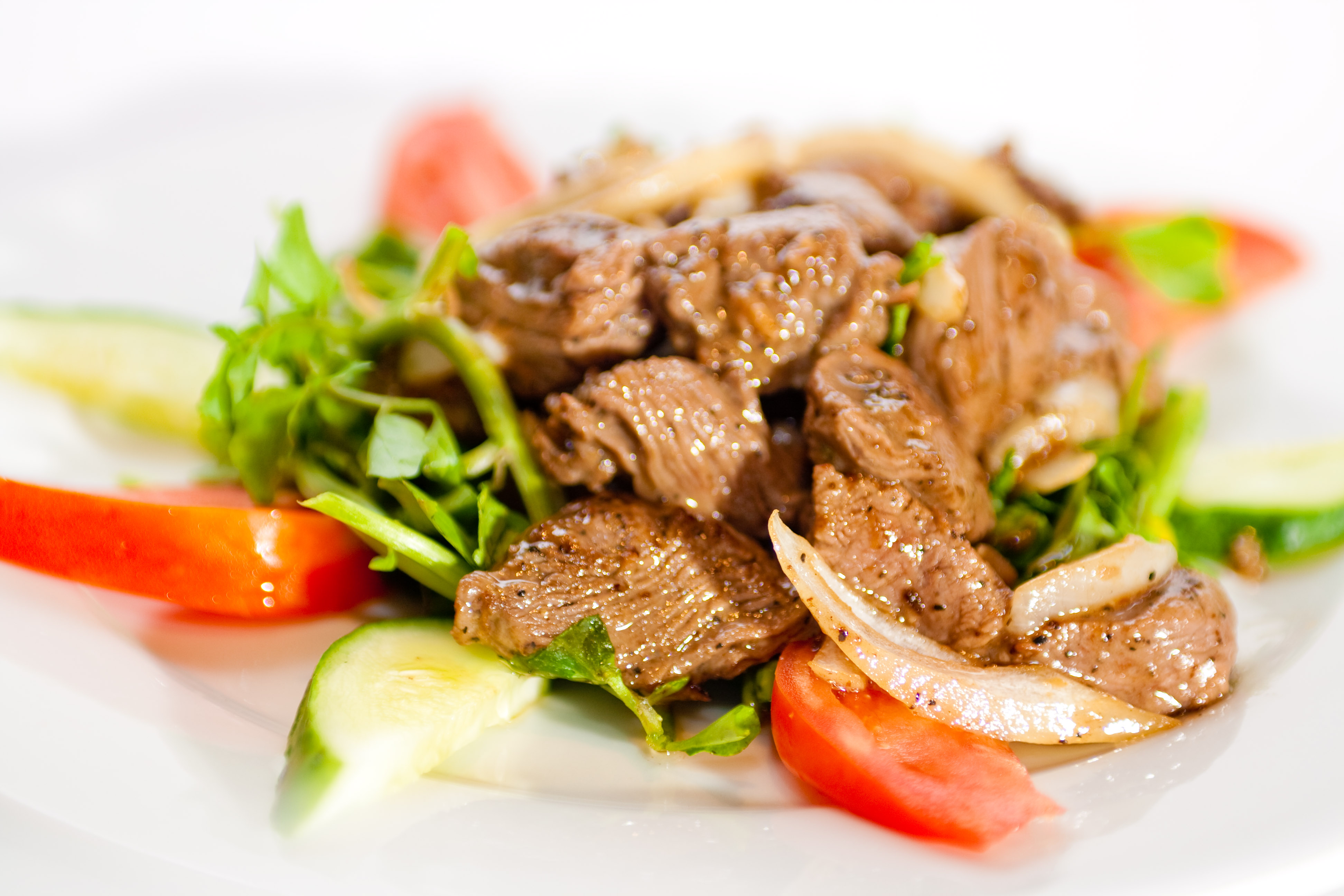
- Alternative names: Bo luc lac, lok lak, loc lac
- Course: Main course
- Place of origin: Vietnam
- Region or state: Southeast Asia
- Associated cuisine: Vietnamese and Cambodian
- Serving temperature: Hot
- Main ingredients: Beef, lettuce or watercress, cucumber, tomato, red onion, bell pepper, fish sauce, soy sauce, and oyster sauce
- Food energy (per serving): 654 kcal (2,740 kJ)
Nutritional value
(per serving)
- Protein: 48 g
- Fat: 46 g
- Carbohydrate: 13 g
- Similar dishes: Lomo saltado

Shaking beef or bo luc lac (Vietnamese: bò lúc lắc, French: bœuf lôc lac) is a Vietnamese dish that consists of beef that has been cut into small cubes, marinated with fish sauce, soy sauce and oyster sauce, then sauteed in a wok with red onion and bell pepper before being served on a bed of fresh lettuce or watercress with slices of tomato and cucumber. Prior to French colonization, beef was considered a luxury ingredient in Vietnam, as cows were rarely slaughtered for food and were kept as working animals to be used for labor instead. This dish was, therefore, mostly reserved for formal events, such as wedding banquets and anniversaries, although now it has become a common food.

== Origin and etymology ==
Shaking beef originated from the sidewalk eateries of Saigon. When the dish was developed, though it used ingredients brought over by the French, it also followed East and Southeast Asian culinary tradition, which calls for the meat to be cut into bite-sized cubes that can be easily handled with chopsticks and eaten without the use of cutlery. This detail gives rise to the first possible etymology for the dish. It was basically named bò lúc lắc because the small, cubed pieces of beef resemble playing dice, which are called hột lúc lắc in Vietnam.

Two other possible etymologies exist centered around the literal translation of bò lúc lắc and what lúc lắc is referring to. In the Vietnamese language, bò means “beef” and lúc lắc means “shaken” or “shaking”. Lúc lắc could describe the constant shaking of the wok that’s needed to get every individual steak cube evenly seared on all sides, while keeping them nice and juicy on the inside. Alternatively, it can be a reference to the motion of the beef cubes themselves. These diced pieces of meat are essentially “shaking” (moving back and forth) as they are tossed in the wok.

== Popularity ==
Shaking beef is now quite popular in the United States.

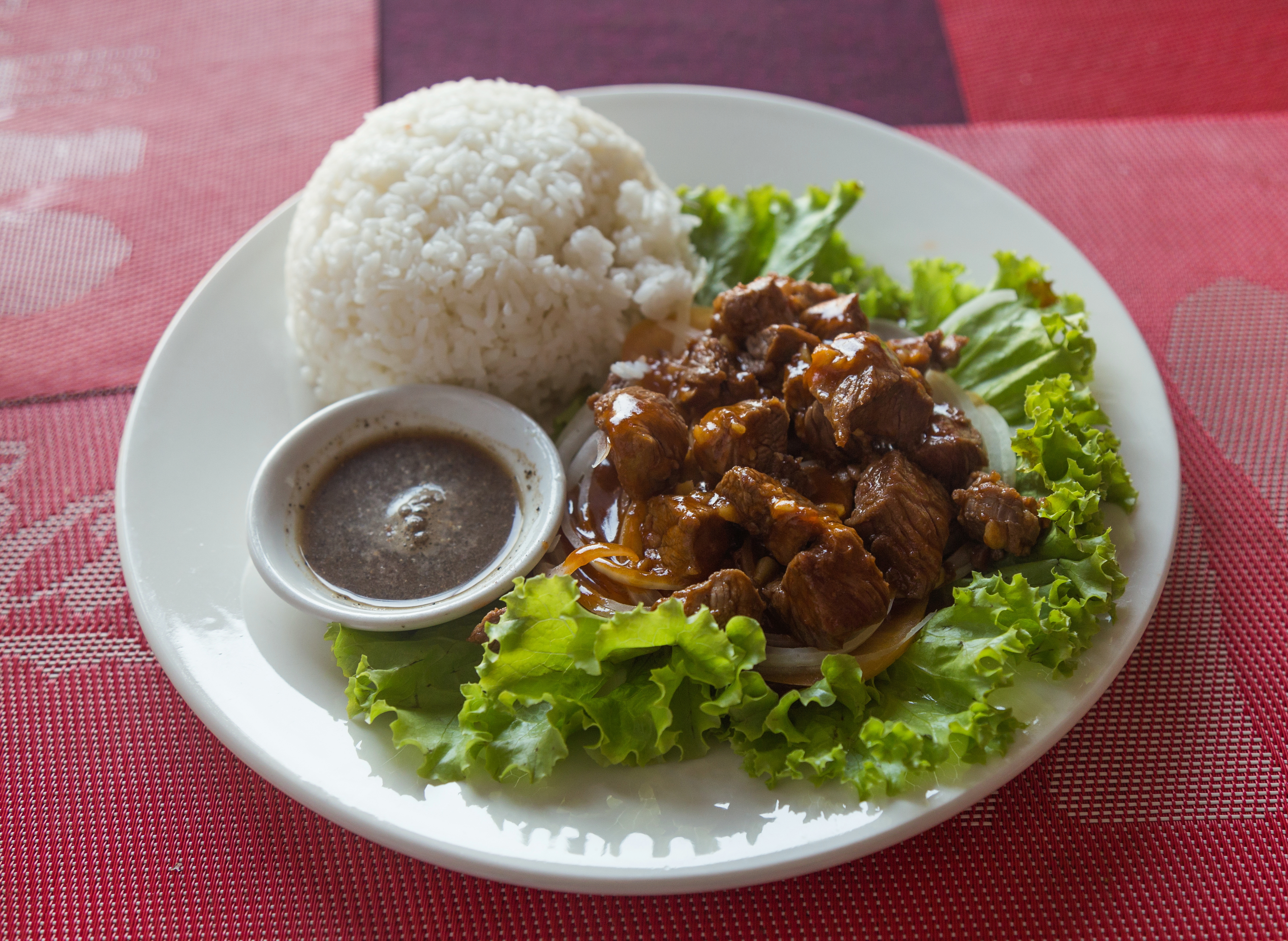
Cambodian lok lak

Over the years, shaking beef had also spread to neighboring Cambodia, where it is known as lok lak or loc lac (Khmer: ឡុកឡាក់), which are loanwords from Vietnamese lúc lắc. The dish is now so widely enjoyed in Cambodia that it has come to be considered one of the country’s national dishes. The initial Cambodian version of shaking beef consisted of high-quality steak cut into pieces and pan-seared in French butter, which stems from Indochina's French colonial past. Later, a simpler version influenced by Chinese culinary techniques emerged using cheaper cuts of beef and Chinese oyster sauce. The beef used in this version, which is the one generally eaten in Cambodia today, is cut into strips and not small cubes as is done in Vietnam.
