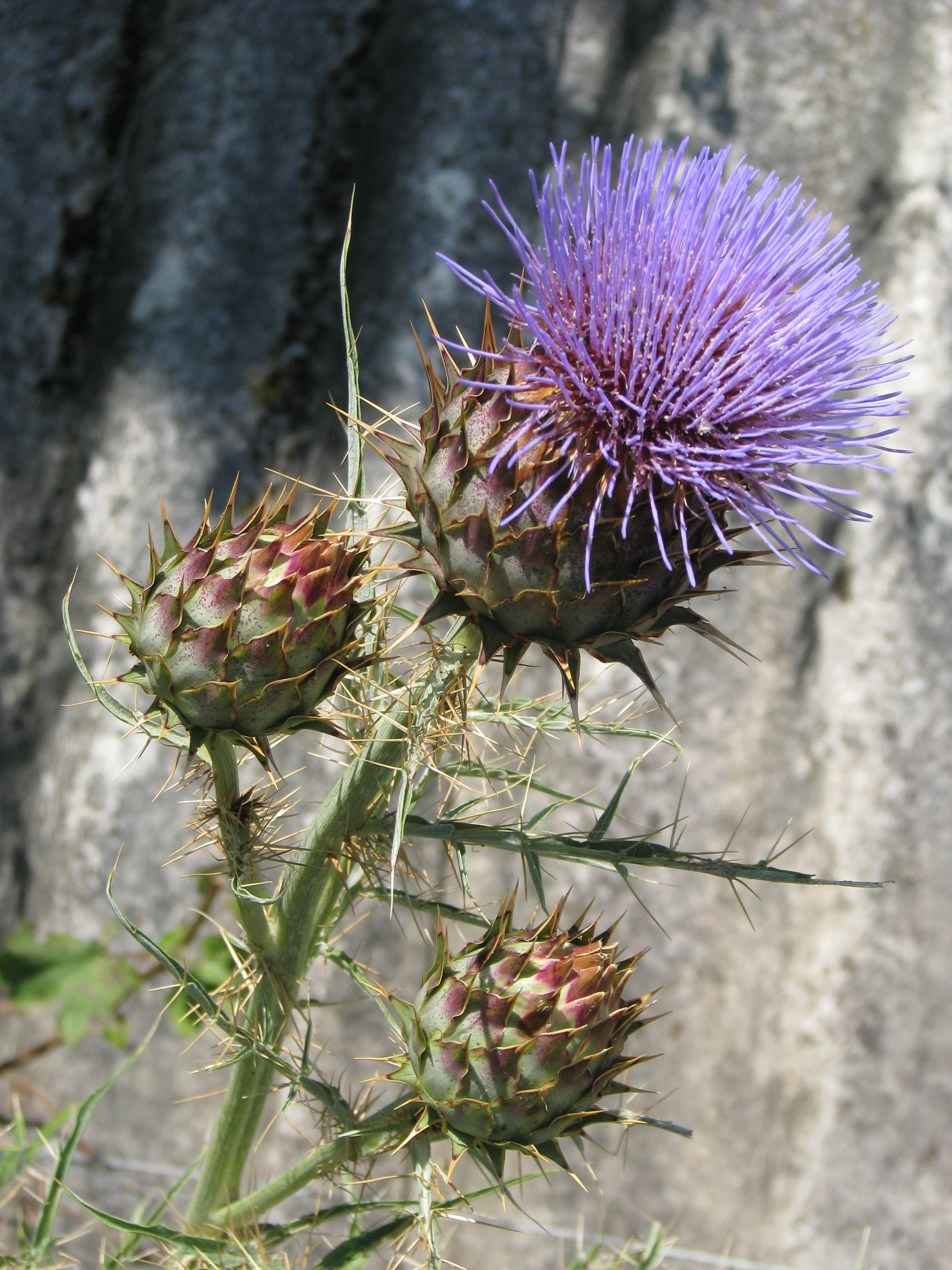
- Cynara cardunculus

Scientific classification
- Kingdom: Plantae
- Clade: Embryophytes
- Clade: Tracheophytes
- Clade: Spermatophytes
- Clade: Angiosperms
- Clade: Eudicots
- Clade: Asterids
- Order: Asterales
- Family: Asteraceae
- Genus: Cynara
- Species: C. cardunculus

Binomial name
- Cynara cardunculus L.

Synonyms
- Carduus cardunculus (L.) Baill.; Carduus cynara E.H.L.Krause; Carduus scolymus Baill.; Cnicus communis Lam.; Cynara communis Lam.; Cynara corsica Viv.; Cynara esculenta Salisb.; Cynara ferox Ten. ex Steud.; Cynara horrida Aiton; Cynara hortensis Mill.; Cynara spinosissima J.Presl & C.Presl; Cynara sylvestris Lam.

= Cardoon =

Species of flowering plant

The cardoon (Cynara cardunculus /ˈsɪnərə kɑːrˈdʌnkjʊləs/), also called the artichoke thistle, is a thistle in the family Asteraceae. It is a naturally occurring species that also has many cultivated forms, including the globe artichoke. It is native to the Mediterranean region, where it was domesticated in ancient times and still occurs as a wild plant.

== Description ==
The wild cardoon is a stout herbaceous perennial plant growing 0.8 to 1.5 m (31 to 59 in) tall, with deeply lobed and heavily spined green to grey-green tomentose (hairy or downy) leaves up to 50 cm (20 in) long, with yellow spines up to 3.5 cm long. The flowers are violet-purple, produced in a large, globose, massively spined capitulum up to 6 cm (2 in) in diameter.

It is adapted to dry climates, native across a circum-Mediterranea area from Morocco and Portugal east to Libya and Greece and north to Croatia and Southern France; it may also be native on Cyprus, the Canary Islands and Madeira. In France, the frost-tender cardoon only occurs wild in the Mediterranean south (Gard, Hérault, Aude, Pyrénées-Orientales, Corsica). It has become an invasive weed in the Pampas of Argentina, and is also considered a weed in Australia and California.

The "giant thistle of the Pampas" reported by Charles Darwin has been identified as cardoon.

== Cultivation ==
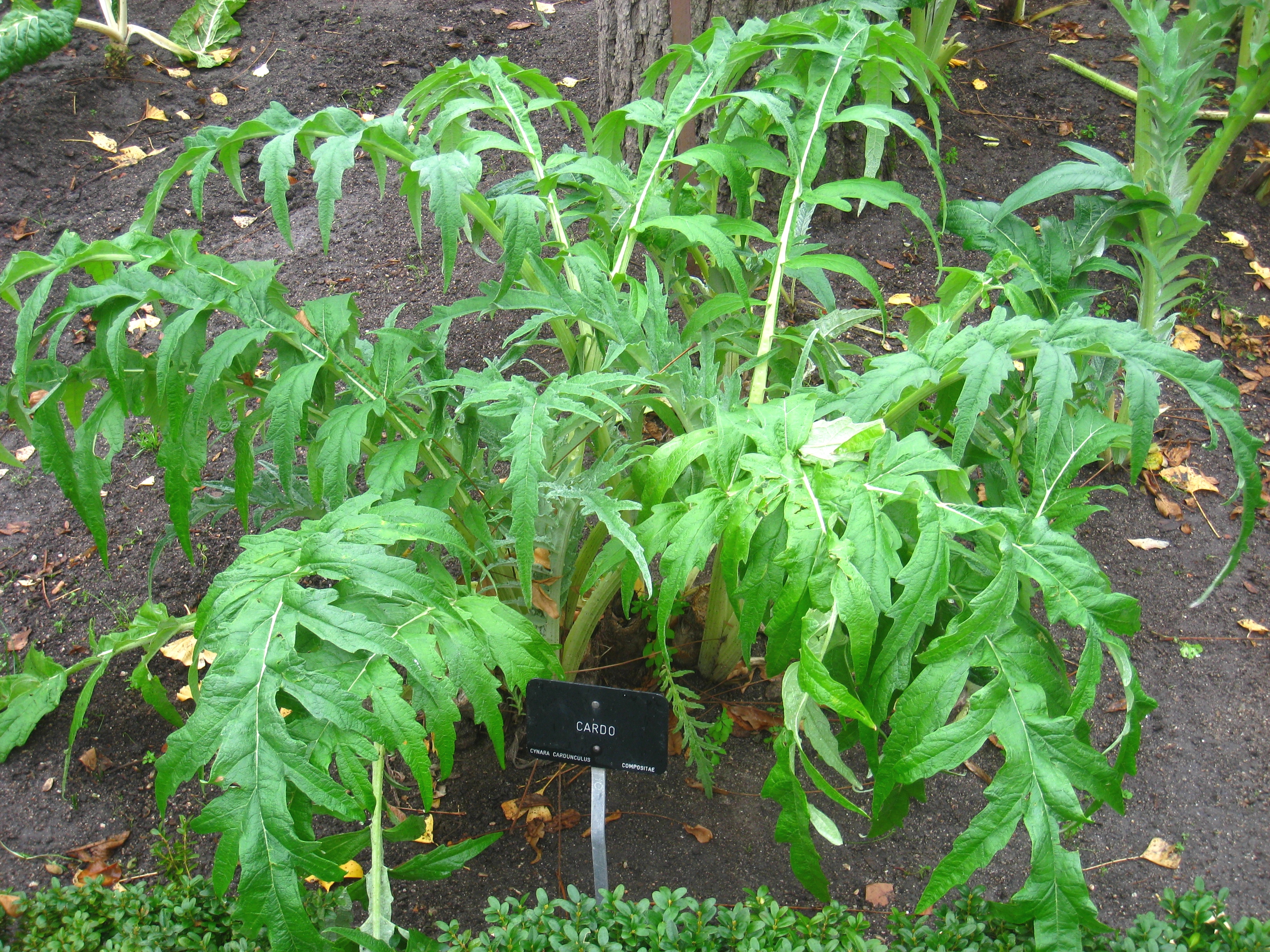
Cultivated cardoon foliage, Madrid Royal Botanical Garden, without leaf spines.

There are two main cultivar groups in the Cynara cardunculus complex, both derived from the wild cardoon (C. cardunculus var. sylvestris (Lam.) Fiori): the cultivated cardoon (Cynara cardunculus Cardoon Group, syn. C. cardunculus var. altilis DC), selected for edible leaf stems, and the artichoke (Cynara cardunculus Scolymus Group, sometimes distinguished as Cynara scolymus or C. cardunculus var. scolymus (L.) Fiori), selected for larger edible flower buds. They differ from the wild plant in being larger (up to 2 m tall), much less spiny, and with thicker leaf stems and larger flowers, all characteristics selected by humans for greater crop yield and easier harvest and processing. Wild and cultivated cardoons and artichokes are very similar genetically, and are fully interfertile, but have only very limited ability to form hybrids with other species in the genus Cynara.

The earliest description of the cardoon may come from the fourth-century BC Greek writer Theophrastus, under the name κάκτος (Latin: cactus), although the exact identity of this plant is uncertain. The cardoon was popular in Greek, Roman, and Persian cuisine, and remained popular in medieval and early modern Europe. It also became common in the vegetable gardens of colonial America, but fell from fashion in the late 19th century and is now very uncommon.

In Europe, cardoon is still cultivated in France (Provence, Savoie, Lyonnais), Spain, and Italy. In the Geneva region, where Huguenot refugees introduced it about 1685, the local cultivar Argenté de Genève ("Cardy") is considered a culinary specialty. "Before cardoons are sent to table, the stalks or ribs are blanched tying them together and wrapping them round with straw, which is also tied up with cord, and left so for about three weeks". Cardoons also are common vegetables in northern Africa, often used in Algerian or Tunisian couscous.

Cardoon, raw
Nutritional value per 100 g (3.5 oz)
- Energy: 71 kJ (17 kcal)
- Carbohydrates: 4.07 g
- Dietary fiber: 1.6 g
- Fat: 0.1 g
- Protein: 0.7 g
Vitamins and minerals
Vitamins	Quantity %DV^{†}
Thiamine (B1)	2% 0.02 mg
Riboflavin (B2)	2% 0.03 mg
Niacin (B3)	2% 0.3 mg
Pantothenic acid (B5)	7% 0.338 mg
Vitamin B6	7% 0.116 mg
Folate (B9)	17% 68 μg
Vitamin C	2% 2 mg
Minerals	Quantity %DV^{†}
Calcium	5% 70 mg
Iron	4% 0.7 mg
Magnesium	10% 42 mg
Manganese	11% 0.256 mg
Phosphorus	2% 23 mg
Potassium	13% 400 mg
Sodium	7% 170 mg
Zinc	2% 0.17 mg
- Other constituents: Quantity
- Water: 94 g
- Link to USDA Database entry
- ^{†}Percentages estimated using US recommendations for adults, except for potassium, which is estimated based on expert recommendation from the National Academies.

Cardoon stalks can be covered with small, nearly invisible spines that can cause substantial pain if they become lodged in the skin. Several spineless cultivars have been developed to overcome this.

Cardoon requires a long, cool growing season (about five months), and while it is not particularly frost-sensitive, in heavier freezes it may lose its leaves and resprout, or in extended hard freezes, die. It also typically requires substantial growing space per plant, so is not much grown except where it is regionally popular.

In cultivation in the United Kingdom, this plant has gained the Royal Horticultural Society's Award of Garden Merit.

== As food ==
=== Nutrition ===
Raw cardoon is 94% water, 4% carbohydrates, 1% protein, and has negligible fat. A 100-gram reference amount provides 71 kilojoules (17 kilocalories) of food energy and moderate amounts (10–19% of the Daily Value) of folate, magnesium, manganese, and sodium.

=== Culinary ===
While the flower buds can be eaten much like small (and spiny) artichokes, more often the stems are eaten after being braised in cooking liquid. Cardoon stems are part of Lyonnaise cuisine (e.g. gratin de cardons). Only the innermost, white stalks are considered edible, and cardoons are therefore usually prepared for sale by protecting the leaf stalks from the sunlight for several weeks. This was traditionally done by burying the plant underground, thus, cardoon plantations in Spain are often formed by characteristic earth mounds surrounding each plant, the earth covering the stalks. In modern cultivation, the plant is usually instead wrapped in black plastic film or other opaque material.

The flower buds of wild cardoons are still widely collected and used in southern Italy and Sicily. In Spain and Portugal, the flower buds are also employed in cheesemaking: the pistils of the cardoon flower are used as a vegetable rennet in the making of some cheeses such as the Torta del Casar and the Torta de la Serena cheeses in Spain, or the Queijo de Nisa and Serra da Estrela cheeses in Portugal. Cardoons were also said to have been used by the Romani or "gypsies" and this would make sense as their encampments would often be situated near sources of water. The vegetable was free for the picking, and could account for the widespread use of the plant. That part is speculative.

Cardoon leaf stalks, which look like giant celery stalks, can be served steamed or braised, and have an artichoke-like flavor with a hint of bitterness. They are harvested in winter and spring, being best just before the plant flowers. In the Abruzzo region of Italy, Christmas lunch is traditionally started with a soup of cardoon cooked in chicken broth with little meatballs (lamb or, more rarely, beef), sometimes with the further addition of egg (which scrambles in the hot soup – called stracciatella) or fried chopped liver and heart.

The cardoon stalks are considered a delicacy in Spain, particularly in the northerns regions of Navarre and Aragon, where they are grown in large quantities. In Spain, cardoons are typically cooked by first boiling the stalks to soften them, and then adding simple sauces such as almond sauce or small amounts of jamón; they are sometimes combined with clams, artichokes, or beans as well.

Because of their seasonality (from November to February), cardoons are a staple of the Christmas dinner in Navarre and the surrounding regions; for the same reason, cardoons are often sold as vegetable preserves, usually in water or brine, so that they can be eaten all year round. Cardoons are an ingredient in one of the national dishes of Spain, the cocido madrileño, a slow-cooking, one-pot, meat and vegetable dish simmered in broth.

In Crete, cardoons are eaten raw, with a drizzle of lemon juice, as a meze, and are considered an excellent accompaniment for raki.

In the US, it is rarely found in conventional grocery stores but is available in supermarkets that cater to largely Italian and European neighborhoods in the mid Atlantic states, as well as some farmers' markets in the months of May, June, and July. As suggested above, they become available in the late autumn near Thanksgiving and Christmas. The main root can also be boiled and served cold. The stems are also traditionally served battered and fried at St. Joseph's altars in New Orleans.

Cardoons can also be found in their "wild" state, on the banks of streams and rivers, and even drainage ditches on the sides of roads in rural areas. These plants look little like the cultivated variety found in stores. They have many thin stems with broad leaves at their ends. There is a reddish color on the stems, which grow tough, hollow and inedible as they age. The wild ones are picked in the spring and early summer. To use them, the leafy part should be removed, and the stems cleaned of "stringy" fibers.

Cardoon is one of the herbs used to flavour Amaro liqueur, which may be called Cardamaro.

== Other uses ==
Cardoons are used as a vegetarian source of enzymes for cheese production. In Portugal, traditional coagulation of the curd relies entirely on this vegetable rennet. This results in cheeses such as the Serra da Estrela and Nisa.

The cardoon is also grown as an ornamental plant for its imposing architectural appearance, with very bright silvery-grey foliage and large flowers in selected cultivars.

Cardoon has attracted recent attention as a possible source of biodiesel fuel. The oil, extracted from the seeds of the cardoon, and called artichoke oil, is similar to safflower and sunflower oil in composition and use. Cardoon is the feedstock for the first biorefinery in the world converting the installations of a petrochemical plant in Porto Torres, Sardinia, providing biomass and oils for the building blocks of bioplastics.

== Gallery ==
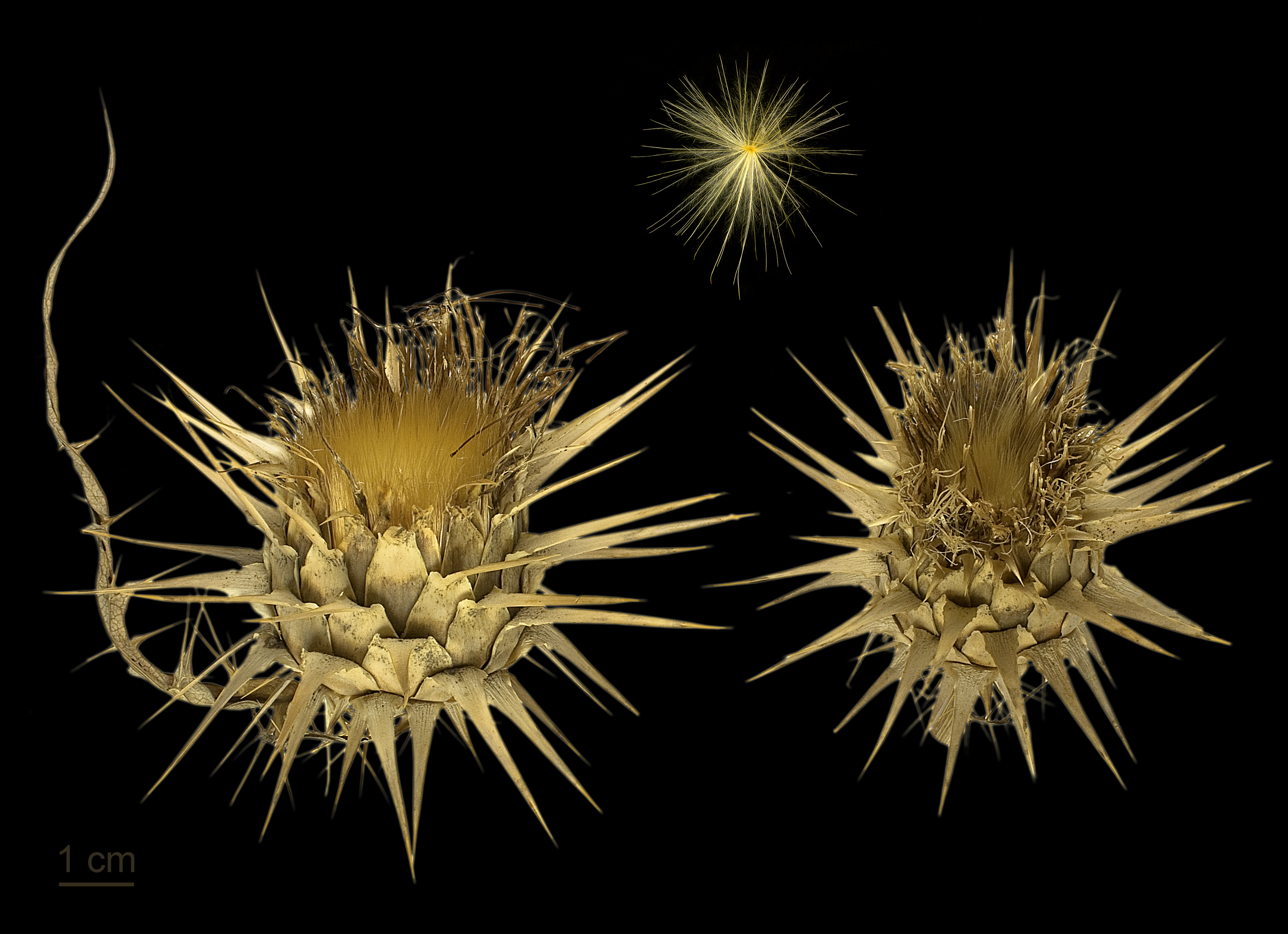
Cynara cardunculus - MHNT

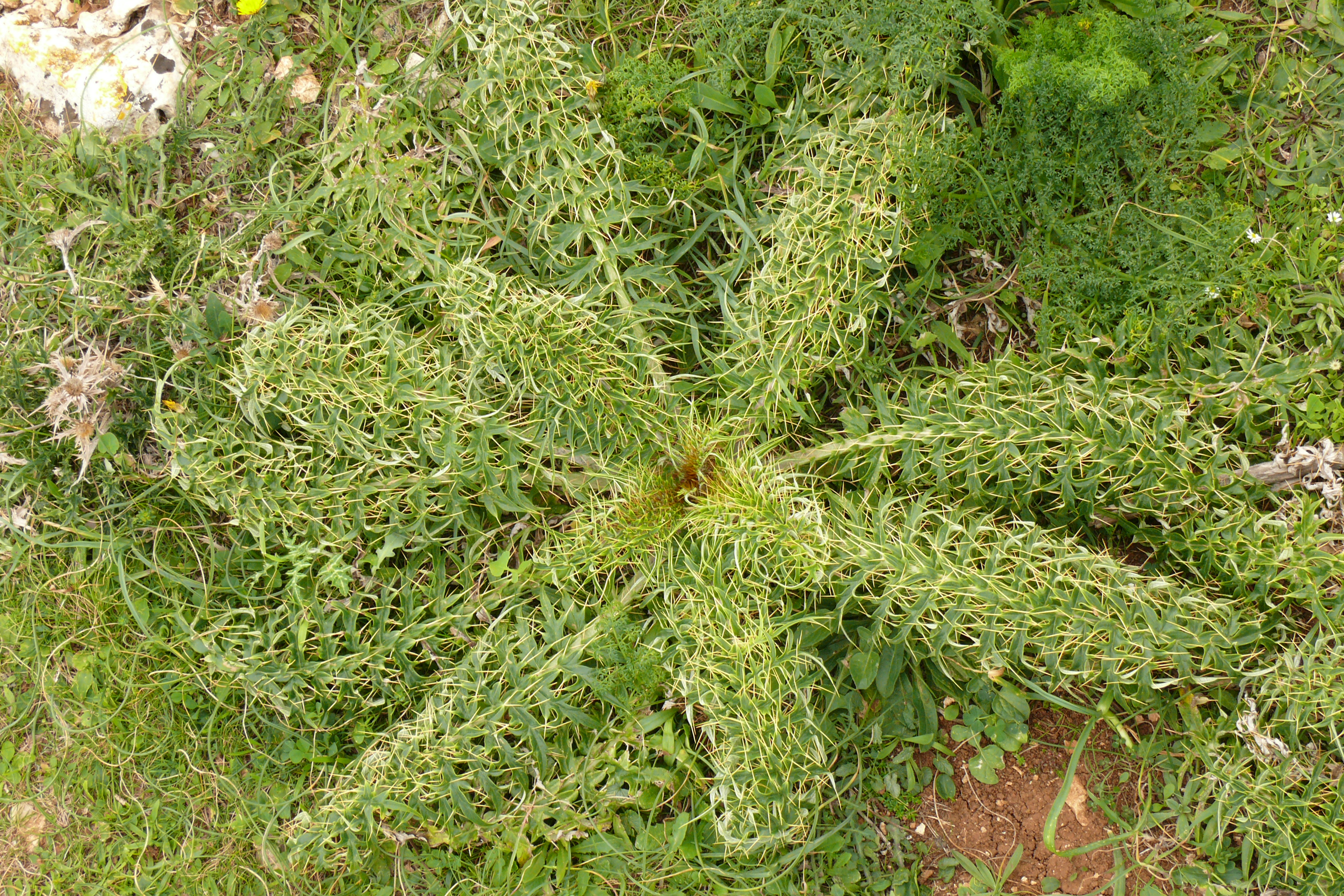
Young leaves of a spiny wild plant

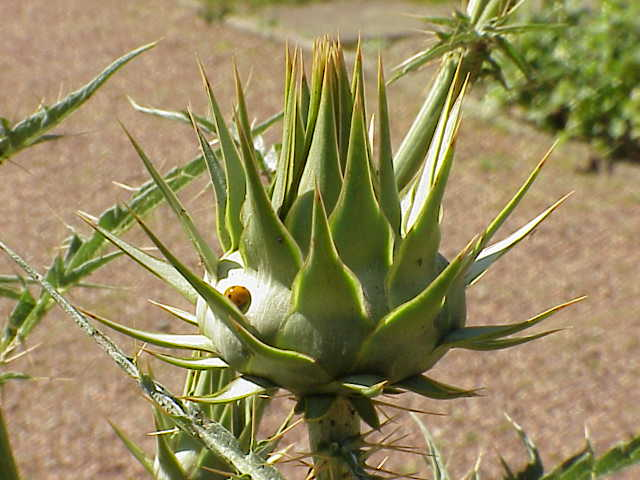
Inflorescence bud

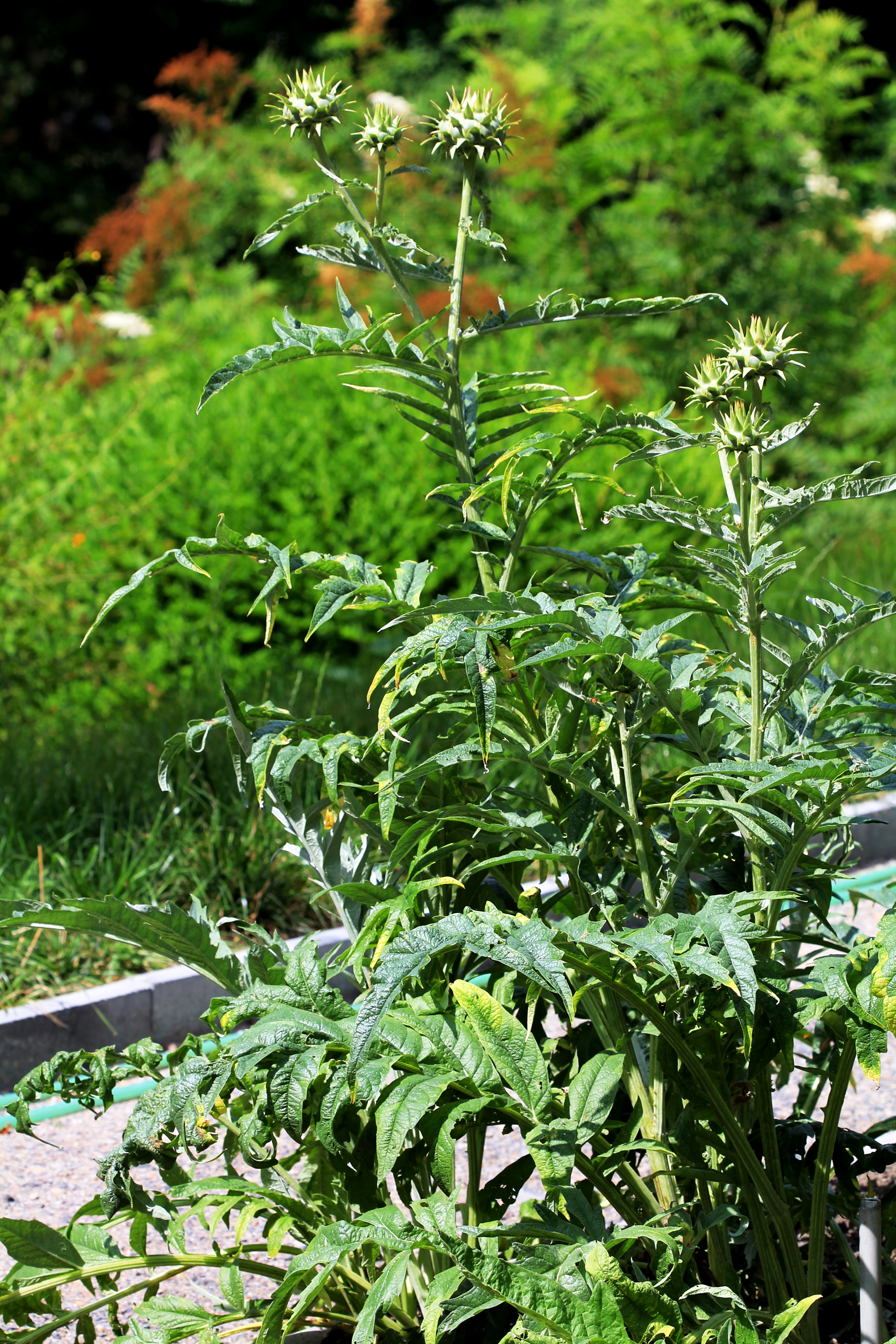
Plants

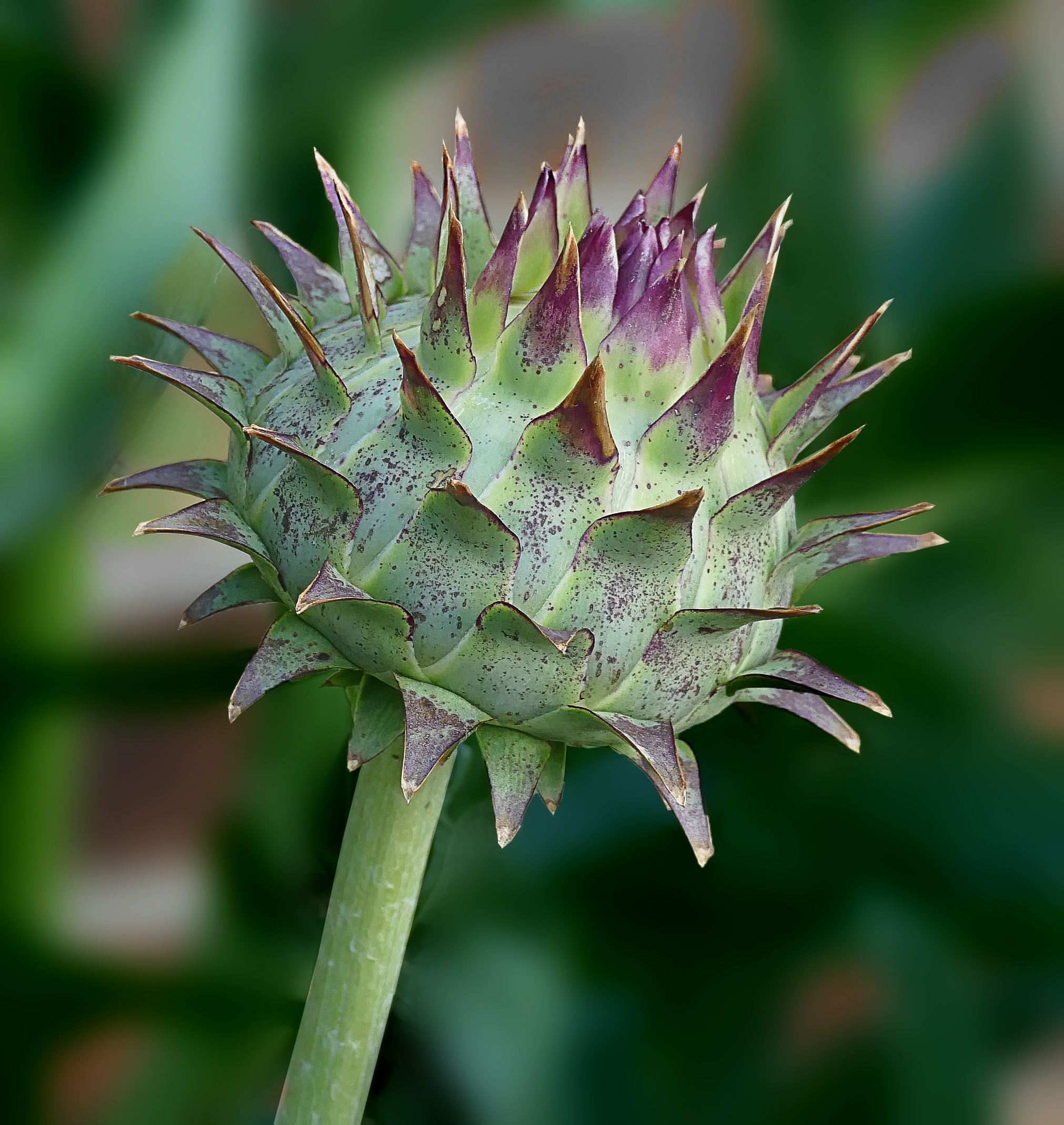

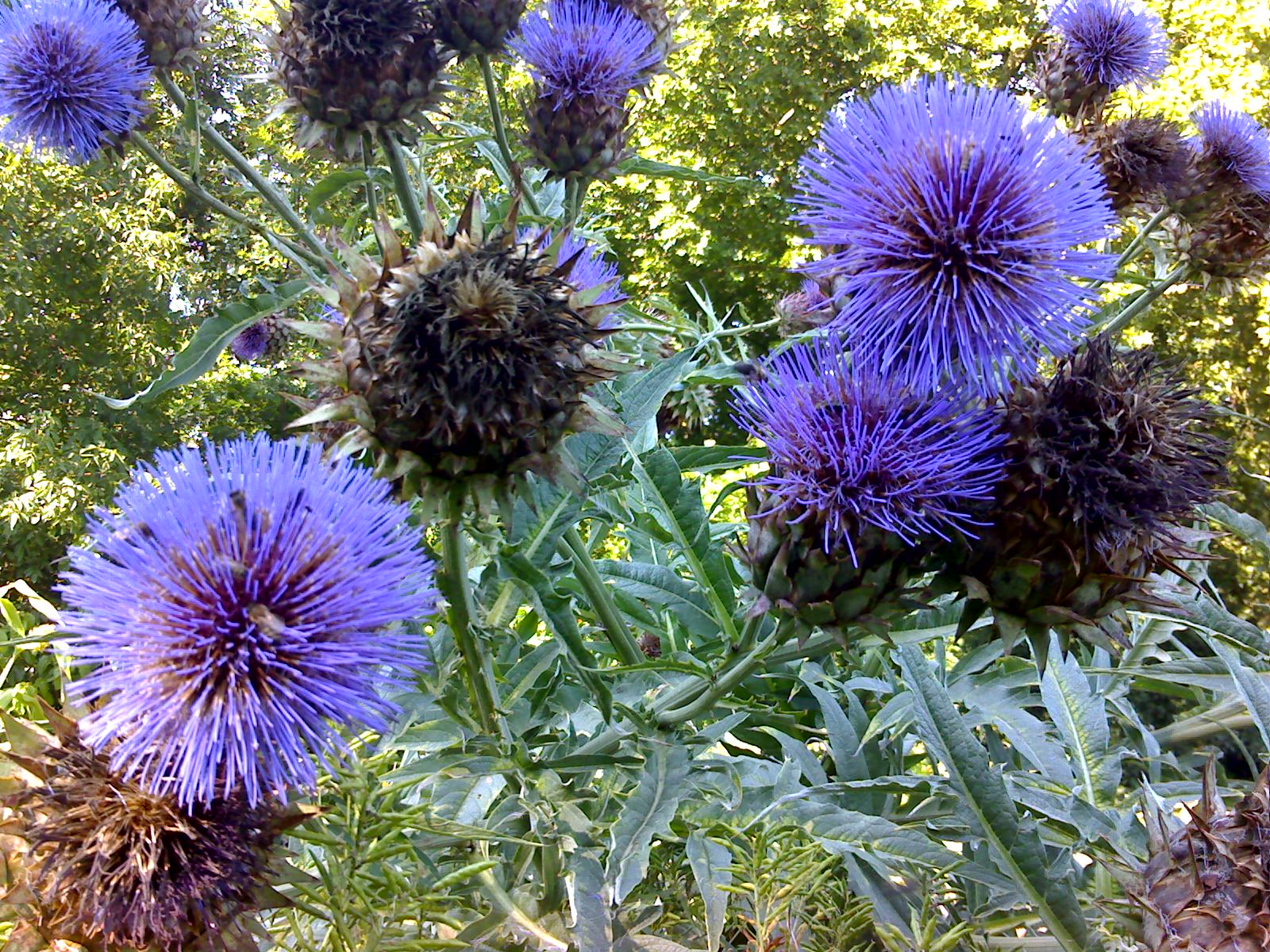
Garden plant in bloom

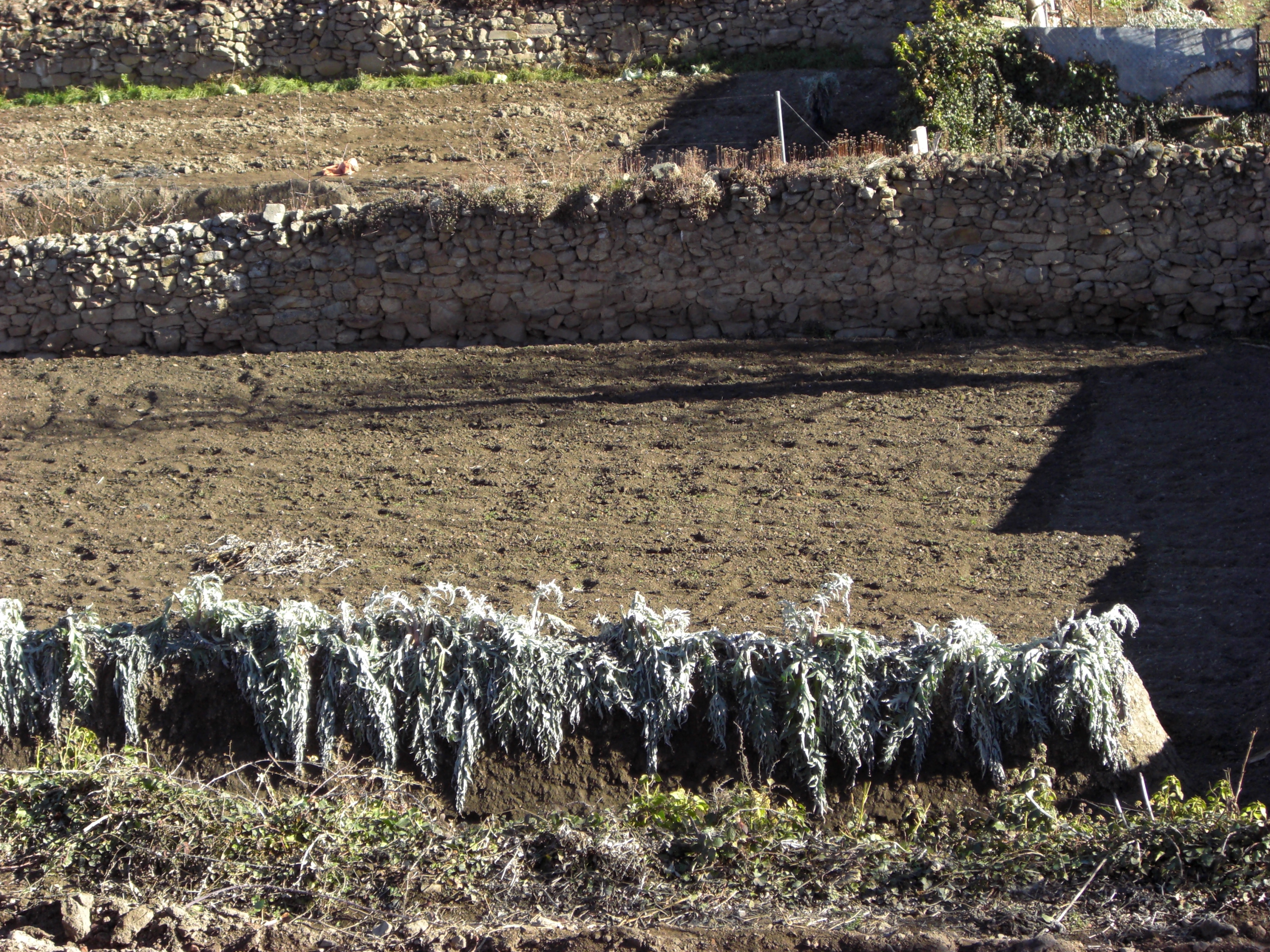
Cultivated cardoons in Ágreda, Spain

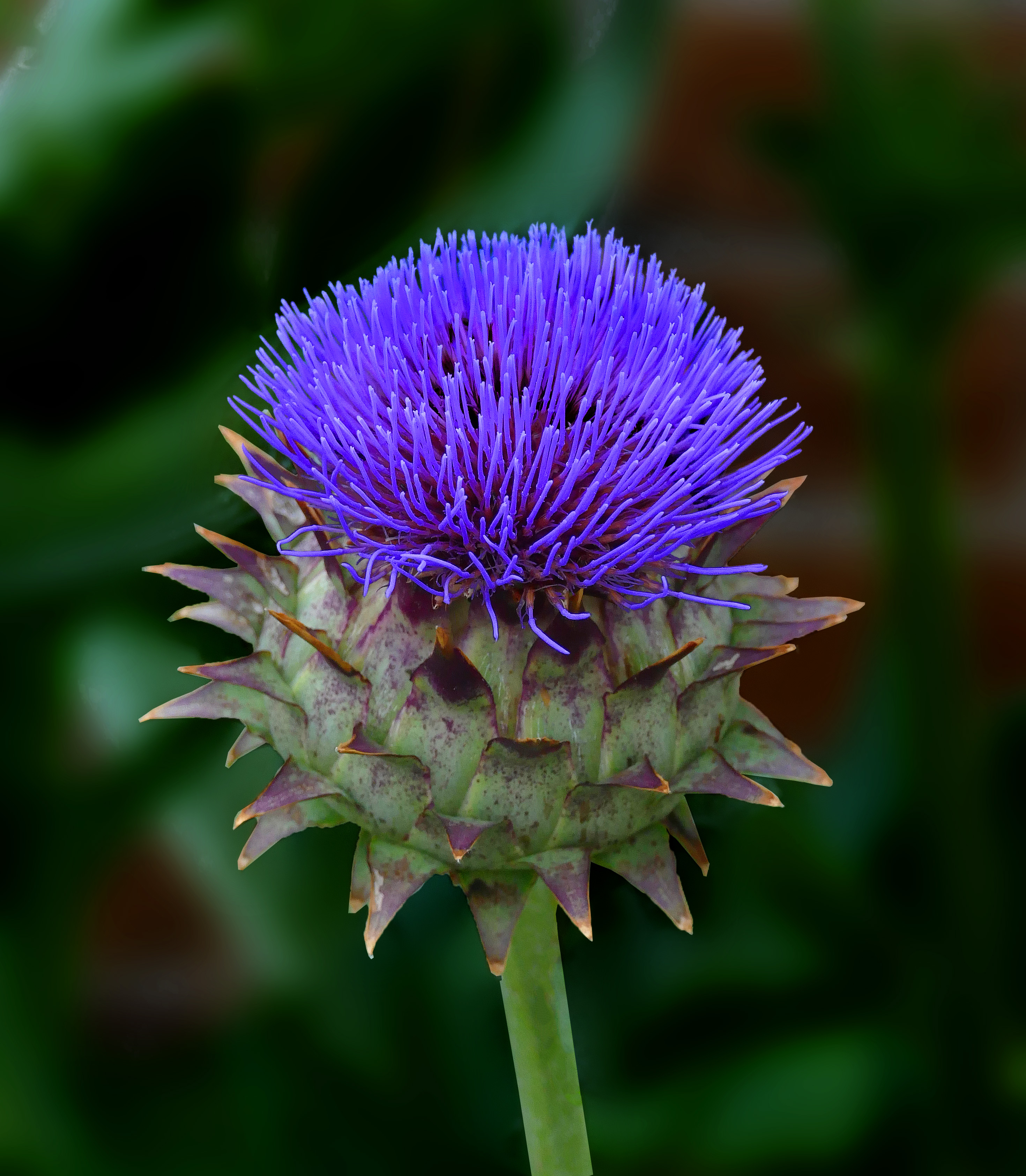
In bloom in a garden near Galveston

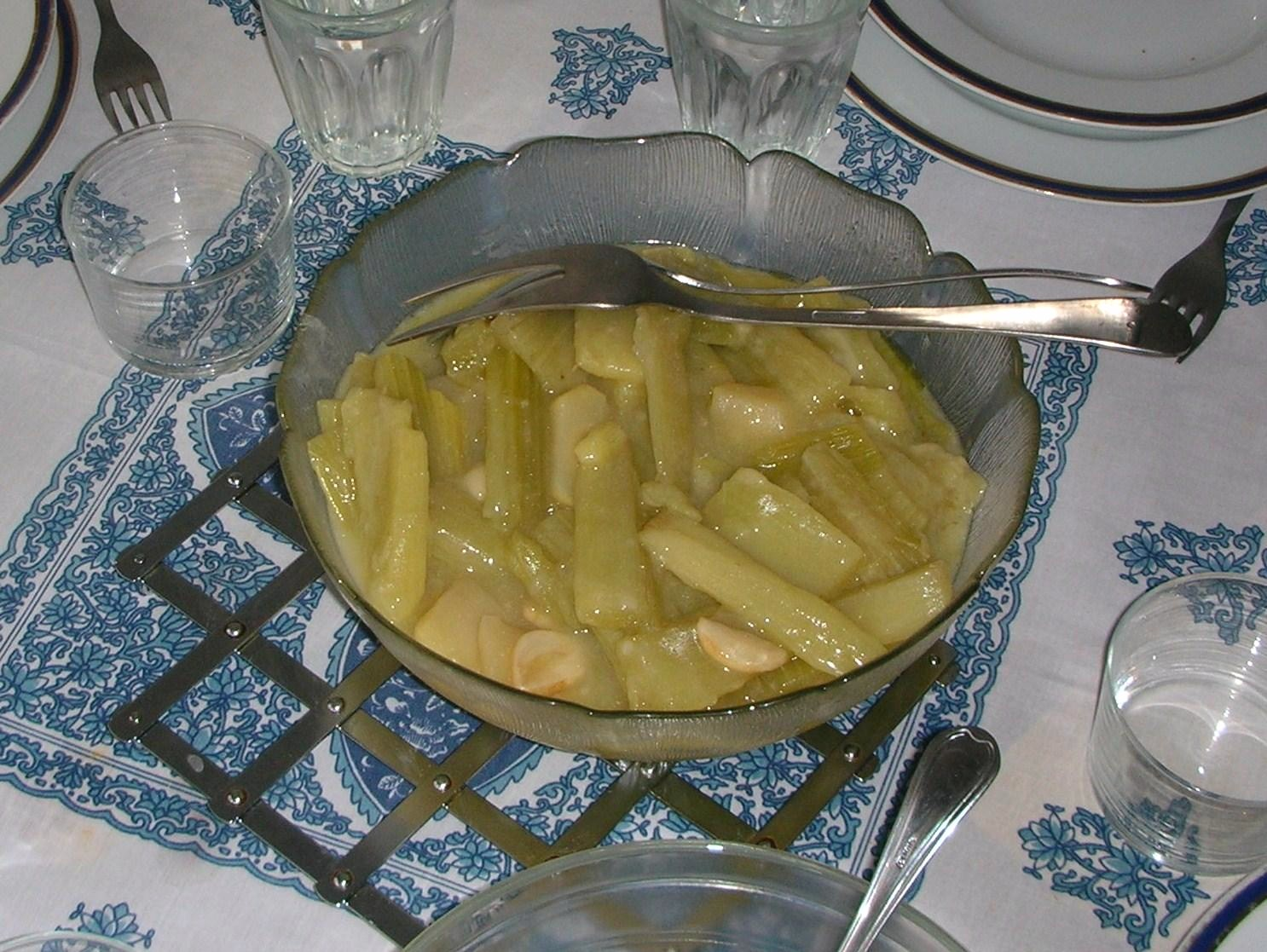
Cardoon prepared in the Navarrese way

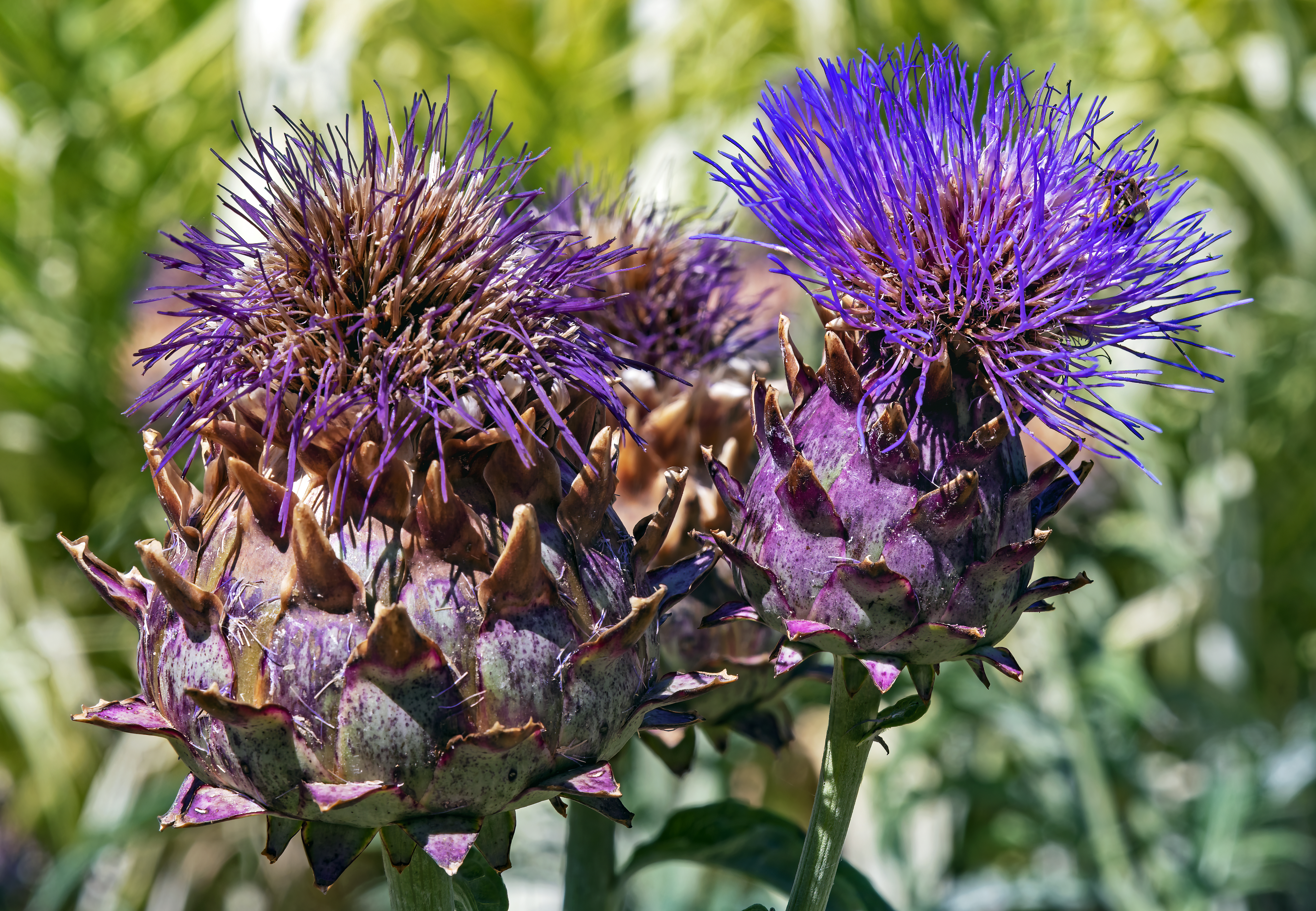
Cardoon plant in early August, Botanical Garden, Gaillac

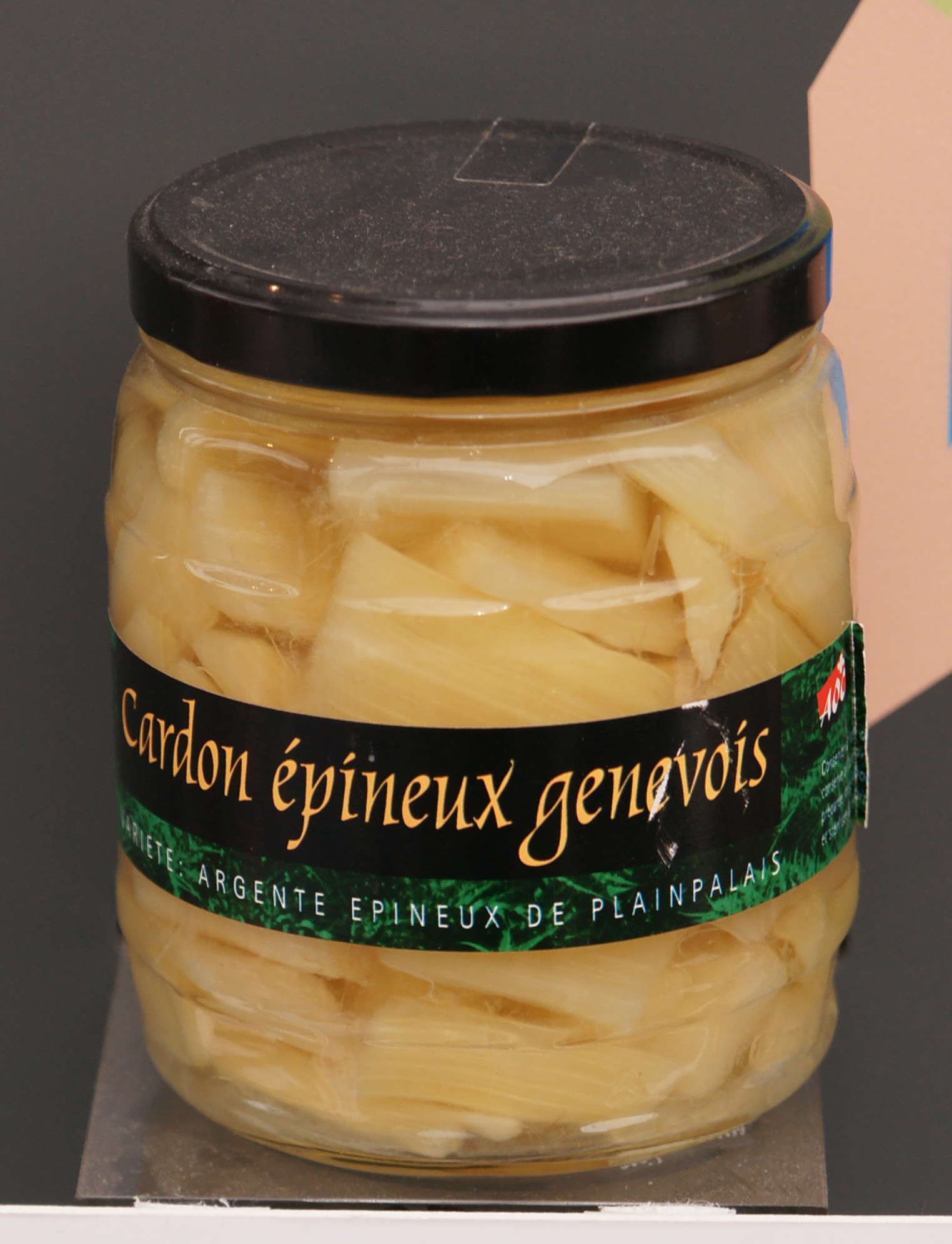
A jar of cooked cardoon stalks.

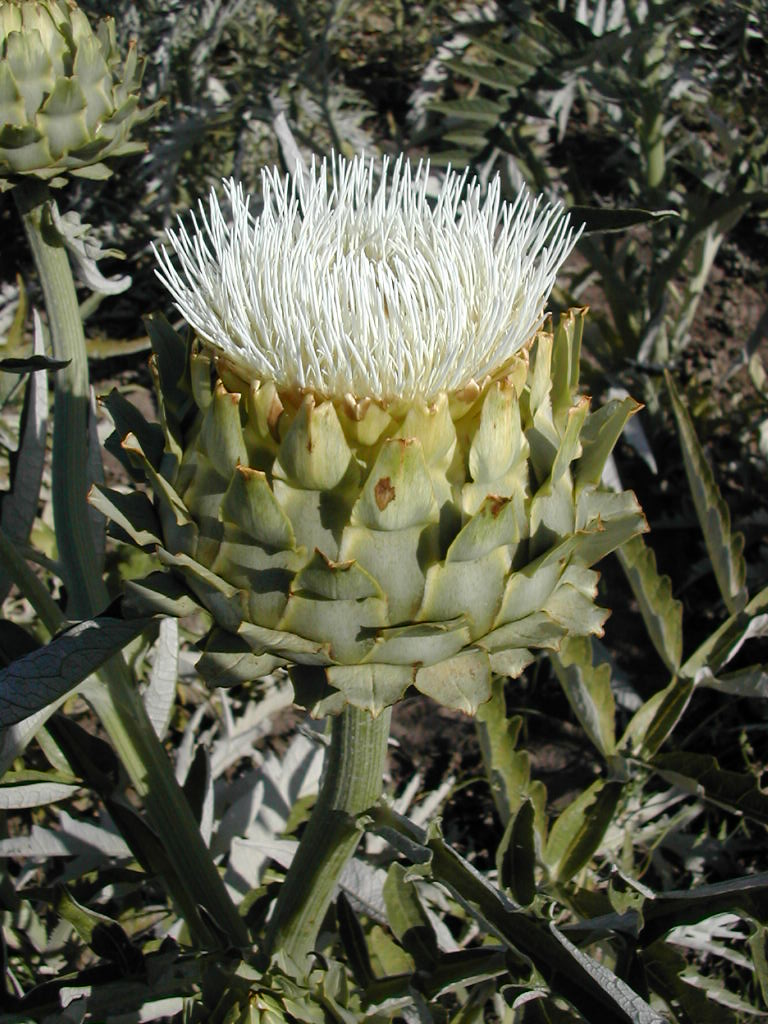
A Cynara cardunculus plant at anthesis bearing white flowers

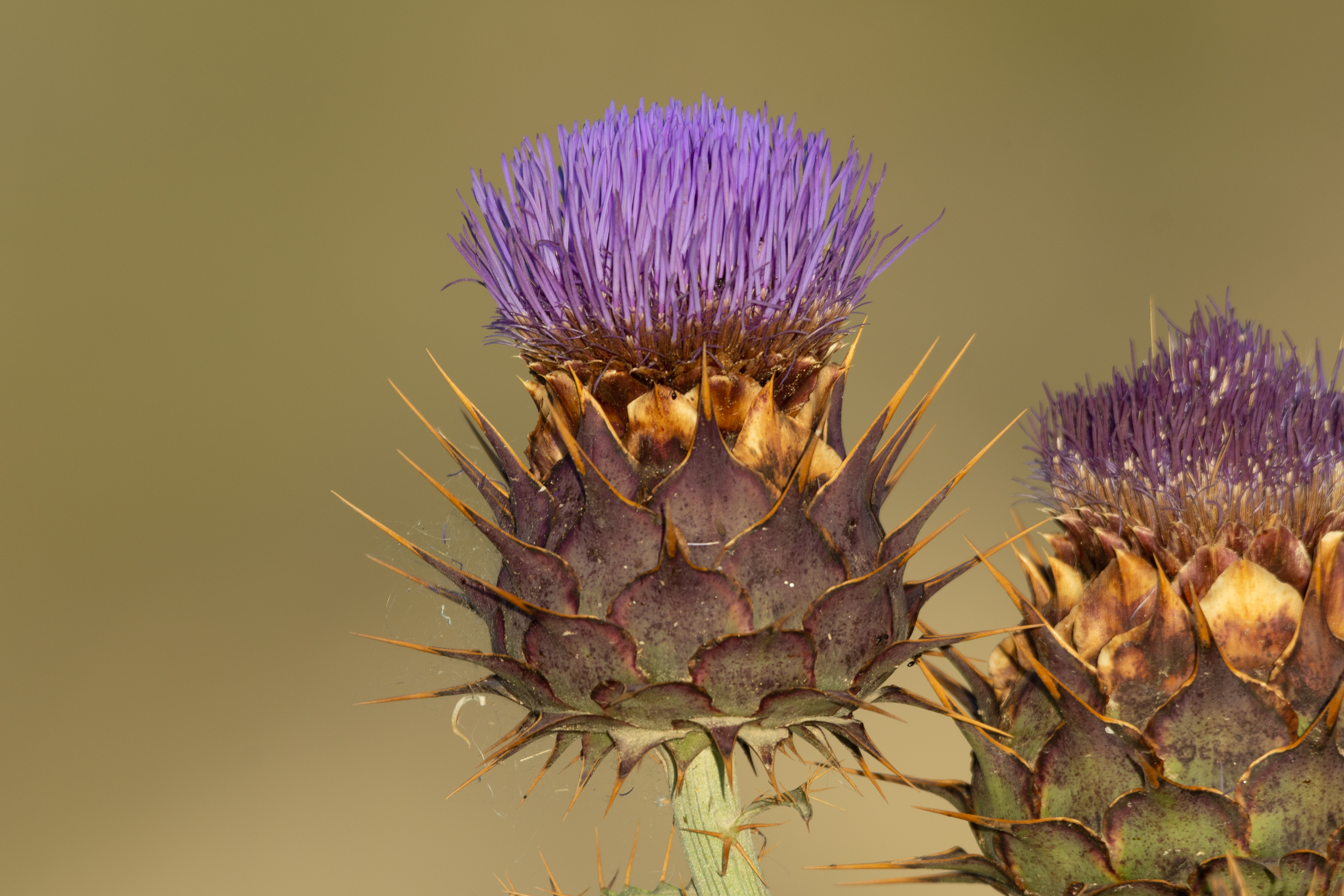
Cardoon (Cynara cardunculus) Zaghouan,Tunisia
