= Casa da Ínsua =

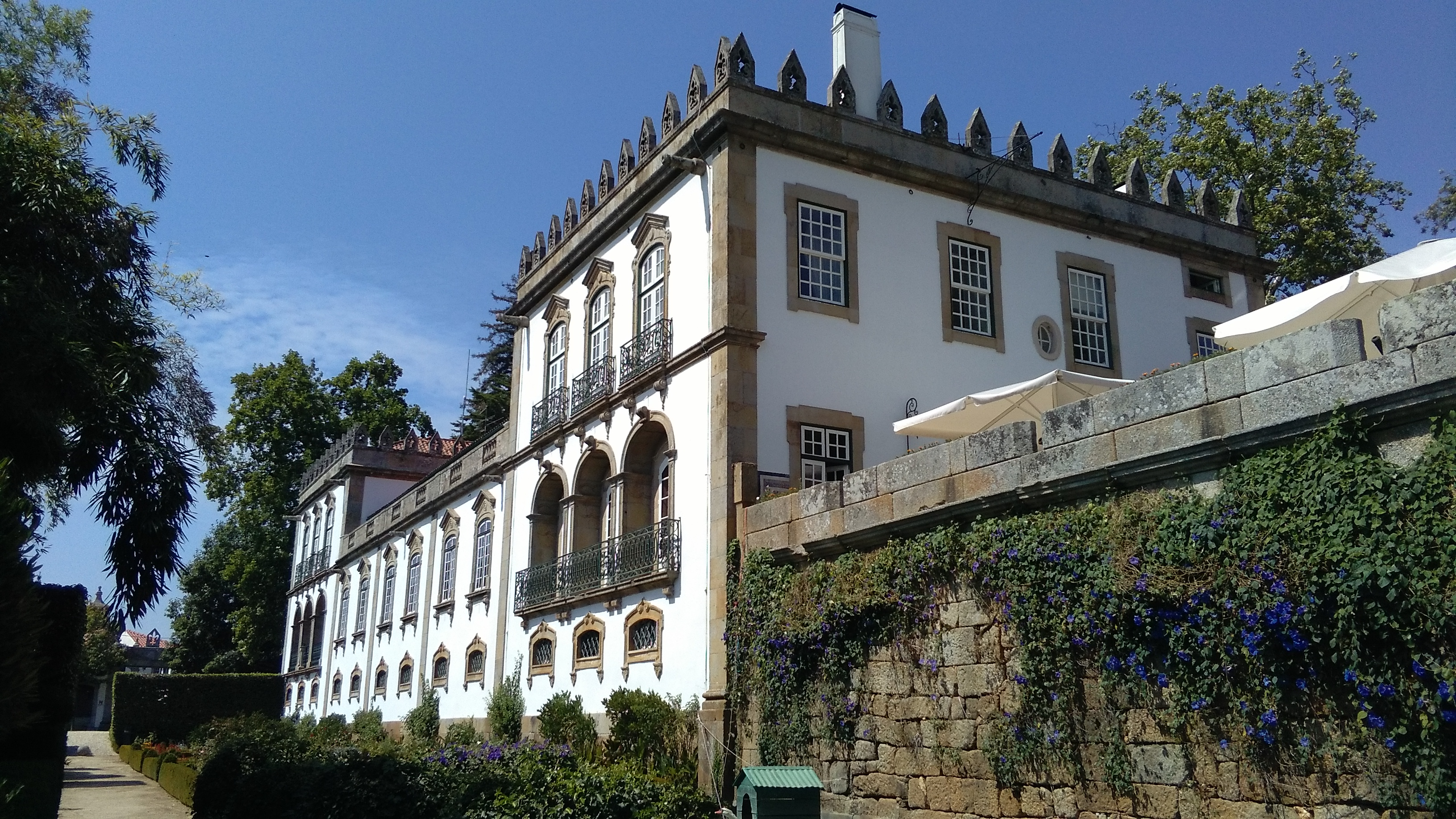
- Interactive map of Casa da Ínsua
- 40.67639°N 7.70639°W
- Location: Penalva do Castelo, Viseu, Portugal

History
- Built: 18th century

Site notes
- Architect: Nicola Bigaglia
- Architectural style: Baroque

Casa da Ínsua (also known as the Solar dos Albuquerques) is a Portuguese baroque palace located in the parish of Ínsua, municipality of Penalva do Castelo, in the district of Viseu.

The estate comprises the main palace, originally used as the residence of its owners (now operated as a hotel), a chapel, and several ancillary buildings required for the running of the property, including accommodation for staff and service quarters. The gardens are divided into formal gardens and English-style gardens, and also feature a large tank and a terrace that connects the house with the gardens.

The Casa da Ínsua, together with the ensemble formed by the gardens, forecourt, lakes, gates, and the northern section of the estate, has been classified as a Property of Public Interest since 1984.

== History ==
An earlier Casa da Ínsua once stood on this site, commissioned by João de Albuquerque e Castro, Alcaide-Mo of Sabugal, from which the chapel and the terrace have survived, albeit with later alterations.

The present house was built in the second half of the eighteenth century at the behest of Luís de Albuquerque de Melo Pereira e Cáceres, Captain-General of Mato Grosso and Cuiabá (Brazil). The project is believed to have been entrusted to the architect José Francisco de Paiva, to whom it is attributed by analogy with other known works of his.

The estate was transmitted through successive generations under the system of morgadio, that is, an entail ensuring inheritance by the family's firstborn, without the possibility of sale. The Casa da Ínsua, however, constituted a particular case, as the inheritance was passed from uncles to nephews, provided the latter remained unmarried.

At the entrance to the house there remain two cannons, dated 1776 and 1793, which were used in the Battle of Bussaco during the Peninsular War.

In the nineteenth century, the palace underwent improvements directed by the Italian architect Nicola Bigaglia, who, in addition to designing the courtyard fountain and the estate gates, also adapted the house to the comforts and modern amenities demanded by the “century of progress.”

The estate housed the only ice factory in the region, a hydroelectric generator, and agricultural units which are still in operation today, such as wine cellars and presses.

The house was still owned in 1969 by the engineer João de Albuquerque de Melo Pereira e Cáceres. In 1970, however, a fire destroyed the extensive library amassed by Luís de Albuquerque de Melo Pereira e Cáceres, resulting in the loss of a vast collection of documentation relating to eighteenth-century Brazil.

João de Albuquerque's great-nephew, Vicente de Olazábal y Brito e Cunha, son of the Counts of Arbelaiz in Spain, inherited the property.

Although still family-owned, the Casa da Ínsua is today operated as a luxury hotel by the Paradores of Spain.

== Architecture and fittings ==
The architectural layout of the Casa da Ínsua is traditionally Portuguese, consisting of a main block set between two towers, which together form the principal façade. To the east lies a courtyard, where the residence joins with the chapel and the service and staff quarters, centred on a granite fountain designed by Bigaglia in 1849.

The exterior is in the baroque style and resembles other Portuguese manor houses of the same period, but is distinguished by decorative pentagonal battlements pierced with fleurs-de-lis and by cannon-shaped gargoyles. These elements were intended to allude to the antiquity of the house and of the family that built it, evoking associations with the Middle Ages.

The piano nobile (particularly on the garden-facing façade) features windows framed in baroque and rococo stonework. The upper floor of the towers is fitted with similar windows but with iron grilles, ironwork that is also repeated in the balconies overlooking the garden, the balcony of the south tower being enclosed at a later date.

On the western façade, the Albuquerque and Pereira coat of arms is displayed, a Rocaille-style escutcheon with a vertically divided shield, positioned at the centre of the upper floor of the tower.

=== Interiors ===
Inside, notable features include the vestibule, with its granite staircase decorated with carved volutes, ceilings painted with the arms of the Albuquerque, Pereira, Melo, and Cáceres families, and a collection of indigenous and hunting weapons, thought to have been brought by Luís de Albuquerque de Melo Pereira e Cáceres during his time in Brazil.

The reception room (to the left of the vestibule) contains painted wallpaper, attributed to Z. Zuber (1827) and decorated by J. M. Gué.

The Portrait Room houses paintings of members of the family of the Casa da Ínsua, including the equestrian portrait of Francisco de Albuquerque e Castro (c.1620–c.1690) by Félix da Costa Meesen (1639?–1712), and that of Luís de Albuquerque de Melo Pereira e Cáceres.

The rooms are decorated in a style typical of Portuguese houses of the period, with coffered wooden ceilings, tiled dados, and hangings embroidered with the family coat of arms, a motif that appears both inside and outside the building. The collection also includes examples of Asian furniture and items made of exotic woods, acquired by the owners of the estate during their travels as indicators of social status.

== Grounds ==
=== Chapel ===
The Chapel of Our Lady of the Immaculate Conception displays the Albuquerque coat of arms above the entrance, as well as a belfry with five superimposed bells and a sixth at the top, an unusual arrangement believed to date back to the chapel's origins.

The interior, consisting of a single nave, contains tiled decoration, a painted dome, and a polychrome neoclassical altarpiece, executed by Luigi Bastitini in the twentieth century.

=== Gardens ===
The main façade of the house, including both towers and the windows of the main floor, overlooks the swan pond and the boxwood gardens, arranged across two terraces. The boxwoods, planted in 1856, form patterns ranging from the family coat of arms to fans and cornucopias, highlighted by camellias and rose bushes planted in the mid-nineteenth century.

The water pond contains swans and lotus flowers, and also contributes to the irrigation of the estate and the operation of the various fountains distributed throughout the grounds.

The English Garden comprises an area of large trees, including sequoias, Brazilwood trees (brought by Luís de Albuquerque), a eucalyptus exceeding fifty metres in height, and Lebanese cedars. The garden also contains the “Fountain of the Children,” designed by Nicola Bigaglia.

The Terrace, extending south at the level of the piano nobile and adjacent to the dining room, is one of the oldest elements of the baroque architectural ensemble, dating from the seventeenth century. It consists of a stone-slab terrace with a low wall interrupted by artillery pieces dated 1844 and inscribed “Casa da Ínsua,” possibly decorative. The opposite wall is tiled, featuring a fountain and a vertical sundial.
