= Penalva do Castelo =

- Municipality and town
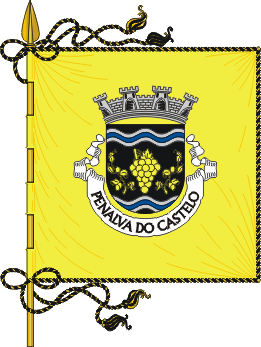
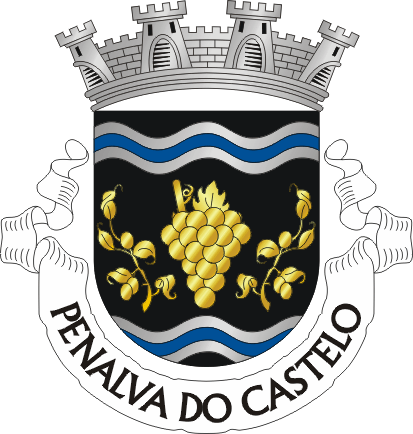
- Flag Seal
- Interactive map of Penalva do Castelo
- Coordinates: 40°40′26″N 7°41′53″W
- Country: Portugal
- Region: Centro (Beiras)
- Subregion: Viseu Dão-Lafões
- District: Viseu
- Founded: 1240
- Civil parishes: 11

Government
  - Mayor: Francisco Carvalho (PS)

Area
  - Total: 134.34 km^{2} (51.87 sq mi)

Population (2021)
  - Total: 7,333
- Demonym: Penalvense
- Time zone: WET (UTC ±0)
  - Summer (DST): WEST (UTC +1)
- Postal code: 3550-135
- Website: www.cm-penalvadocastelo.pt

Penalva do Castelo is a town in Portugal in the district of Viseu, situated in the province of Beira Alta Province, the Centro (Beiras Region) and the Viseu Dão-Lafões subregion, with around 2000 inhabitants.

It is the seat of the Municipality of Penalva do Castelo, covering 134.34 km^{2} and 7333 inhabitants (2021), divided into 11 civil parishes. The municipality borders Sátão to the north, Aguiar da Beira to the northeast, Fornos de Algodres to the east, Mangualde to the south and Viseu to the west.

== Etymology ==
The toponym Penalva do Castelo originates from the Latin expression penna alba, meaning “white rock,” referring to a light-colored rocky elevation where, according to tradition, an ancient medieval fortress once stood. This fortification was located on the left bank of the Dão River, although no physical remains survive today. The mention of a "castle" in the modern name reinforces that connection to defensive structures which played an important role in the region's surveillance and defense during the Middle Ages.

Until the mid-20th century, the town was known as Castendo, a toponym thought to derive from Castanetum, meaning a place abounding in chestnut trees. The name "Penalva do Castelo" was officially adopted in 1957 by Decree-Law No. 41.222 of 7 August, as a way to recover the historical designation linked to local heritage and identity.

== Administrative division ==
The municipality of Penalva do Castelo is divided into 11 civil parishes:

Antas e Matela; Castelo de Penalva; Esmolfe; Germil; Ínsua; Lusinde	Pindo; Real; Sezures; Trancozelos; Vila Cova do Covelo e Mareco

== Heritage ==
- Casa da Ínsua – 18th-century baroque manor, now operating as a hotel and museum complex.
- Igreja da Misericórdia de Penalva do Castelo – Religious temple in the town centre, of architectural and historical value.
- Mosteiro do Santo Sepulcro (Trancozelos) – Founded in the 12th century, the first Order of the Holy Sepulchre monastery in Portugal.
- Ponte Romana de Castelo de Penalva – Roman-origin bridge over the Dão River.
- Anta do Penedo do Com (Esmolfe) – Prehistoric megalithic monument.
- Sepulturas Antropomórficas de Esmolfe – Group of medieval rock-cut graves.
- Igreja Matriz de Castelo de Penalva – Parish church with notable heritage elements.
- Pelourinho de Penalva do Castelo – Municipal pillory dating from the 16th century.
- Escola Básica e Secundária de Penalva do Castelo – Headquarters of the Penalva do Castelo School Group, offering education from pre-school to secondary level.

== Population evolution ==
Penalva do Castelo
Year	Pop.	±%
1864	11,710	—
1878	12,810	+9.4%
1890	13,252	+3.5%
1900	13,742	+3.7%
1911	14,042	+2.2%
1920	13,185	−6.1%
1930	13,404	+1.7%
1940	14,267	+6.4%
1950	15,028	+5.3%
1960	13,686	−8.9%
1970	11,283	−17.6%
1981	10,172	−9.8%
1991	9,166	−9.9%
2001	9,019	−1.6%
2011	7,956	−11.8%
2021	7,333	−7.8%

Number of inhabitants by age group
	1900	1911	1920	1930	1940	1950	1960	1970	1981	1991	2001	2011	2021
0–14 years	4 698	5 057	4 546	4 562	4 945	4 951	4 493	3 265	2 609	1 993	1 372	979	750
15–24 years	2 510	2 350	2 285	2 562	2 404	2 334	2 130	1 565	1 598	1 309	1 307	786	680
25–64 years	5 693	5 515	5 246	5 273	5 577	5 953	5 646	4 780	4 168	4 041	4 215	3 890	3 340
65+ years	840	1 064	959	1 080	1 178	1 380	1 417	1 435	1 797	1 823	2 125	2 301	2 563

== Local products ==
- Maçã Bravo de Esmolfe – Apple variety originating from Esmolfe, medium-to-small size, juicy flesh and intense aroma.
- Queijo Serra da Estrela – Sheep's-milk cheese using thistle as coagulant.
- Vinho do Dão – Signature wine of the region, from the Dão demarcated area.

== Festivities ==
The Feira do Pastor e do Queijo, held since 1991, highlights local products such as Serra da Estrela cheese, Dão wine and the Bravo de Esmolfe apple.

There is also the Bravo de Esmolfe Apple Fair, held annually in October since 1996, promoting the autochthonous Bravo de Esmolfe apple and showcasing regional products such as Dão wine, Serra da Estrela cheese and local crafts.

== Notable people ==
- João Aurélio – Professional footballer who began his youth career at Sport Clube Penalva do Castelo, later played for Nacional da Madeira, Vitória de Guimarães and Moreirense in the Portuguese Primeira Liga.
- Bruno Loureiro – Midfielder from Viseu who made his senior debut at Sport Clube Penalva do Castelo (2008–2012), later played for Académico de Viseu, Farense and Polish side Pogoń Szczecin.
