= Presunto =

Portuguese dry-cured ham

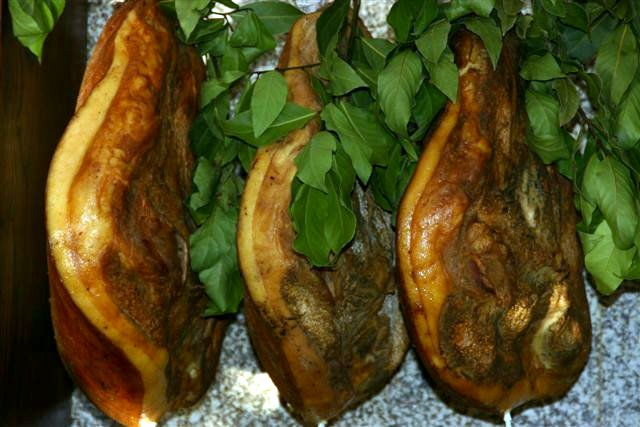
Traditional ham of Chaves, Portugal

Presunto (Portuguese: [pɾɨˈzũtu]) is dry-cured ham from Portugal, similar to Italian prosciutto or Spanish jamón. Among the wide variety of presuntos in Portugal, the best known are presunto from Chaves, produced in the north of Portugal, and from the Alentejo, in the south, made from local Alentejano pigs.

Several varieties of presunto are protected by European law with geographical indications.

== Etymology ==
The word is from Vulgar Latin past participle persunctus, ultimately from the verb sugo, 'to suck'.

== Presunto PDO and IGP ==
In March 2014, six varieties of presunto were protected by European law registered with protected designation of origin:

- Presunto de Barrancos (PGO)
- Presunto do Alentejo and Paleta do Alentejo (PDO)
- Presunto de Barroso (PGI)
- Presunto de Campo Maior e Elvas and Paleta de Campo Maior e Elvas (PGI)
- Presunto de Santana da Serra and Paleta de Santana da Serra (PGI)
- Presunto de Vinhais or Presunto Bísaro de Vinhais (PGI)

== See also ==
Media related to Presunto at Wikimedia Commons

- List of Portuguese food and drink products with protected status
- List of hams
- List of dried foods
