= Anta do Penedo do Com =

Prehistoric dolmen in Viseu District, Portugal

- Orca do Penedo do Com
- Interactive map of Anta do Penedo do Com
- 40°41′38.12″N 7°40′12.22″W
- Type: Dolmen
- Periods: Late Neolithic
- Location: Penalva do Castelo, Viseu District, Portugal

Site notes
- Material: Granite
- Height: 2.55 m (8.4 ft)
- Length: 3.30 m (10.8 ft)
- Width: 3.10 m (10.2 ft)
- Diameter: 15 m (49 ft)
- Excavation dates: 1911; 1998–
- Discovered: c. 1911
- Condition: Restored
- Public access: Yes

The Anta do Penedo do Com is a dolmen located in a granite area known as the Penedo do Com in Pontão in the parish of Esmolfe in the municipality of Penalva do Castelo, Viseu District, Portugal. It has been listed as a Property of Public Interest since 1992. This dolmen has been well restored, providing a clear illustration of how such burial tombs were originally constructed, although only a few of the original stones are now in place.

== History and description ==
The site is in a valley at an altitude of 502 metres on the banks of the Sezures and Oronho streams, in an area where granite outcrops were abundant but have now been largely destroyed by mining. It is surrounded by a forest area of maritime pine. This megalithic monument dates back to the end of the fourth millennium or beginning of the third millennium in the Late Neolithic period. It is believed that it was reused in the Late Chalcolithic or early Bronze Age. It has a polygonal chamber measuring 3.30m × 3.10m, with a height of 2.55 metres, consisting of nine orthostats covered by the original capstone weighing 7.8 tons. The covered entrance passage, which is four metres long, one metre wide, and 1.40 metres high, has four monoliths on each side, two of which on the north side are original, and is covered by four other monoliths, none of which are original. The tumulus, which would have covered the dolmen, is no longer visible although it is possible to observe vestiges of the stones that marked its exterior. It had a diameter of between 13 and 15 metres.

This monument was first mentioned in 1911 in the newspaper O Século and later documented by the noted ethnographer and archaeologist, José Leite de Vasconcelos. The first excavation was in 1911 by José António Domingos dos Santos, who found 12 mushroom-shaped flint and quartz points, 10 flint points, and 2 rock crystal points, a polished stone axe, fragments of clay vessels, bones, and charcoal. In 1956, Georg and Vera Leisner visited the dolmen and initiated its classification, but only in June 1992 was it classified as a Property of Public Interest. By 1997, its condition was very poor, with only three granite slabs remaining in their original position, and the capstone lying flat over the orthostats.

From 1998, further archaeological excavations uncovered a total of 1,075 additional objects, including 84 mushroom-shaped points of flint and milky quartz, 19 microliths, 12 blades, 15 bladelets, two scrapers, four hand mills, a polished axe, a triangular pendant, various types of bead, spherical ceramic vessels, eight truncated conical carinated vessels, and five bell-shaped beakers. These excavations were part of works commissioned by the Penalva do Castelo municipality to excavate, restore and enhance the dolmen. Almost the entire monument was reconstructed, as all the monoliths on the south side had been knocked down, and only two of those on the north side remained, and these were also lying on their sides. Rocks found nearby were used to replace the missing ones.

== Access ==
The dolmen is included in the Megalithic Route of the Viseu Dão Lafões and Sever do Vouga region of Portugal. It can be reached by road.
