= List of Portuguese food and drink products with protected status =

A number of food and drink products from Portugal have been granted Protected Geographical Status under European Union law and UK law through the Protected Designation of Origin (PDO), Protected Geographical Indication (PGI) or Traditional Speciality Guaranteed (TSG) regimes. The legislation is designed to protect regional foods and came into force in 1992.

In 2021, the following indications were registed:

- 94 Portuguese PDOs or DOP (Denominação de Origem Protegida)
- 85 Portuguese PGIs or IGP (Indicação Geográfica Protegida)
- 1 Portuguese TSGs (Traditional Speciality Guaranteed) or ETG (Especialidade Tradicional Garantida)

Do not confuse with DOC (Denominação de Origem Controlada), which is a Portuguese national classification scheme.

This list is sourced from the official index published by the European Commission and is not complete.

== Olive oil and olives ==
=== Olive oil ===
- Azeite de Moura (PDO)
- Azeite de Trás-os-Montes (PDO)
- Azeite do Alentejo Interior (PDO)
- Azeites da Beira Interior (PDO)
  - Azeite da Beira Alta (PDO)
  - Azeite da Beira Baixa (PDO)
- Azeites do Norte Alentejano (PDO)
- Azeites do Ribatejo (PDO)

=== Olives ===
- Azeitona de Conserva Negrinha de Freixo (PDO)
- Azeitonas de conserva de Elvas e Campo Maior (PDO)

== Meat ==
=== Beef ===
- Carne alentejana (PDO)
- Carne Arouquesa (PDO)
- Carne Barrosã (PDO)
- Carne Cachena da Peneda (PDO)
- Carne de Bravo do Ribatejo (PDO)
- Carne da Charneca (PDO)
- Carne Marinhoa (PDO)
- Carne Maronesa (PDO)
- Carne Mertolenga (PDO)
- Carne Mirandesa (PDO)
- Carne dos Açores (PGI)
- Carne de Bovino Cruzado dos Lameiros do Barroso (PGI)
- Vitela de Lafões (PGI)

=== Goat meat ===
- Cabrito Transmontano (PDO)
- Cabrito do Alentejo (PGI)
- Cabrito de Barroso (PGI)
- Cabrito da Beira (PGI)
- Cabrito da Gralheira (PGI)
- Cabrito das Terras Altas do Minho (PGI)

=== Lamb and mutton ===
- Borrego Serra da Estrela (PDO)
- Borrego Terrincho (PDO)
- Cordeiro Bragançano (PDO)
- Cordeiro Mirandês or Canhono Mirandês (PDO)
- Borrego do Baixo Alentejo (PGI)
- Borrego da Beira (PGI)
- Borrego do Nordeste Alentejano (PGI)
- Borrego de Montemor-o-Novo (PGI)
- Cordeiro de Barroso, Anho de Barroso or Cordeiro de leite de Barroso (PGI)

=== Pork ===
- Carne de porco Alentejano (PDO)
- Carne de Bísaro Transmontano or Carne de Porco Transmontano (PDO)

== Meat products ==
=== Alheira ===
- Alheira de Barroso-Montalegre (PGI)
- Alheira de Vinhais (PGI)

=== Farinheira ===
- Farinheira de Estremoz e Borba (PGI)
- Farinheira de Portalegre (PGI)

=== Presunto (dry-cured ham) ===
- Presunto de Barrancos (PDO)
- Presunto do Alentejo and Paleta do Alentejo (PDO)
- Presunto de Barroso (PGI)
- Presunto de Campo Maior e Elvas e Paleta de Campo Maior e Elvas (PGI)
- Presunto de Santana da Serra e Paleta de Santana da Serra (PGI)
- Presunto de Vinhais or Presunto Bísaro de Vinhais (PGI)

=== Others ===
- Butelo de Vinhais, Bucho de Vinhais or Chouriço de Ossos de Vinhais (PGI)
- Cacholeira Branca de Portalegre (PGI)
- Chouriça Doce de Vinhais (PGI)
- Chouriça de Carne de Barroso-Montalegre (PGI)
- Chouriça de Carne de Vinhais or Linguiça de Vinhais (PGI)
- Chouriço de Abóbora de Barroso-Montalegre (PGI)
- Chouriço Azedo de Vinhais, Azedo de Vinhais and Chouriço de Pão de Vinhais (PGI)
- Chouriço de Carne de Estremoz e Borba (PGI)
- Chouriço grosso de Estremoz e Borba (PGI)
- Chouriço Mouro de Portalegre (PGI)
- Chouriço de Portalegre (PGI)
- Linguíça do Baixo Alentejo or Chouriço de carne do Baixo Alentejo (PGI)
- Linguiça de Portalegre (PGI)
- Lombo Branco de Portalegre (PGI)
- Lombo Enguitado de Portalegre (PGI)
- Morcela de Assar de Portalegre (PGI)
- Morcela de Cozer de Portalegre (PGI)
- Morcela de Estremoz e Borba (PGI)
- Paia de Estremoz e Borba (PGI)
- Paia de Lombo de Estremoz e Borba (PGI)
- Paia de Toucinho de Estremoz e Borba (PGI)
- Painho de Portalegre (PGI)
- Paio de Beja (PGI)
- Salpicão de Barroso-Montalegre (PGI)
- Salpicão de Vinhais (PGI)
- Sangueira de Barroso-Montalegre (PGI)

== Fish and fish products ==
- Bacalhau de Cura Tradicional Portuguesa (TSG)

== Vegetables and cereals ==
=== Rice ===
- Arroz Carolino das Lezírias Ribatejanas (PGI)

=== Sweet potato ===
- Batata doce de Aljezur (PGI)

=== Potato ===
- Batata de Trás-os-Montes (PGI)

== Fresh fruits ==
=== Prune ===
- Ameixa d´Elvas (PDO)

=== Pineapple ===
- Ananás dos Açores/São Miguel (PDO)

=== Custard apple ===
- Anona da Madeira (PDO)

=== Cherry ===
- Cereja de São Julião-Portalegre (PDO)
- Cereja da Cova da Beira (PGI)

=== Citrus ===
- Citrinos do Algarve (PGI)

=== Apple ===
- Maçã Bravo de Esmolfe (PDO)
- Maçã Riscadinha de Palmela (PDO)
- Maçã de Alcobaça (PGI)
- Maçã da Beira Alta (PGI)
- Maçã da Cova da Beira (PGI)
- Maçã de Portalegre (PGI)

=== Passion fruit ===
- Maracujá dos Açores/S. Miguel (PDO)

=== Pear ===
- Pêra Rocha do Oeste (PDO)

=== Peach ===
- Pêssego da Cova da Beira (PGI)

== Dried fruits ==
=== Almond ===
- Amêndoa Douro (PDO)

=== Chestnut ===
- Castanha da Padrela (PDO)
- Castanha da Terra Fria (PDO)
- Castanha do Marvão-Portalegre (PDO)
- Castanha dos Soutos da Lapa (PDO)

== Honey ==
- Mel da Serra da Lousã (PDO)
- Mel da Serra de Monchique (PDO)
- Mel da Terra Quente (PDO)
- Mel das Terras Altas do Minho (PDO)
- Mel de Barroso (PDO)
- Mel do Alentejo (PDO)
- Mel do Parque de Montezinho (PDO)
- Mel do Ribatejo Norte (PDO)
- Mel dos Açores (PDO)

== Cheese and other dairy products ==
=== Cheese ===
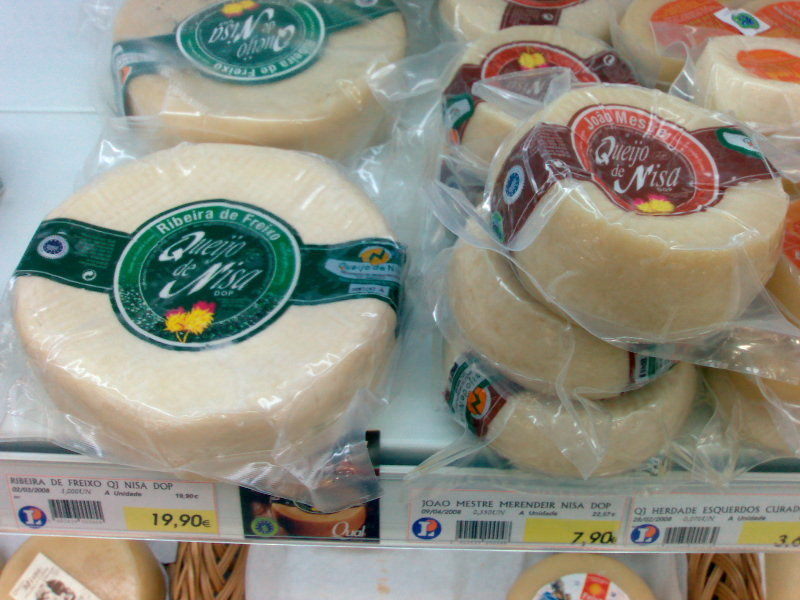
Queijo de Nisa

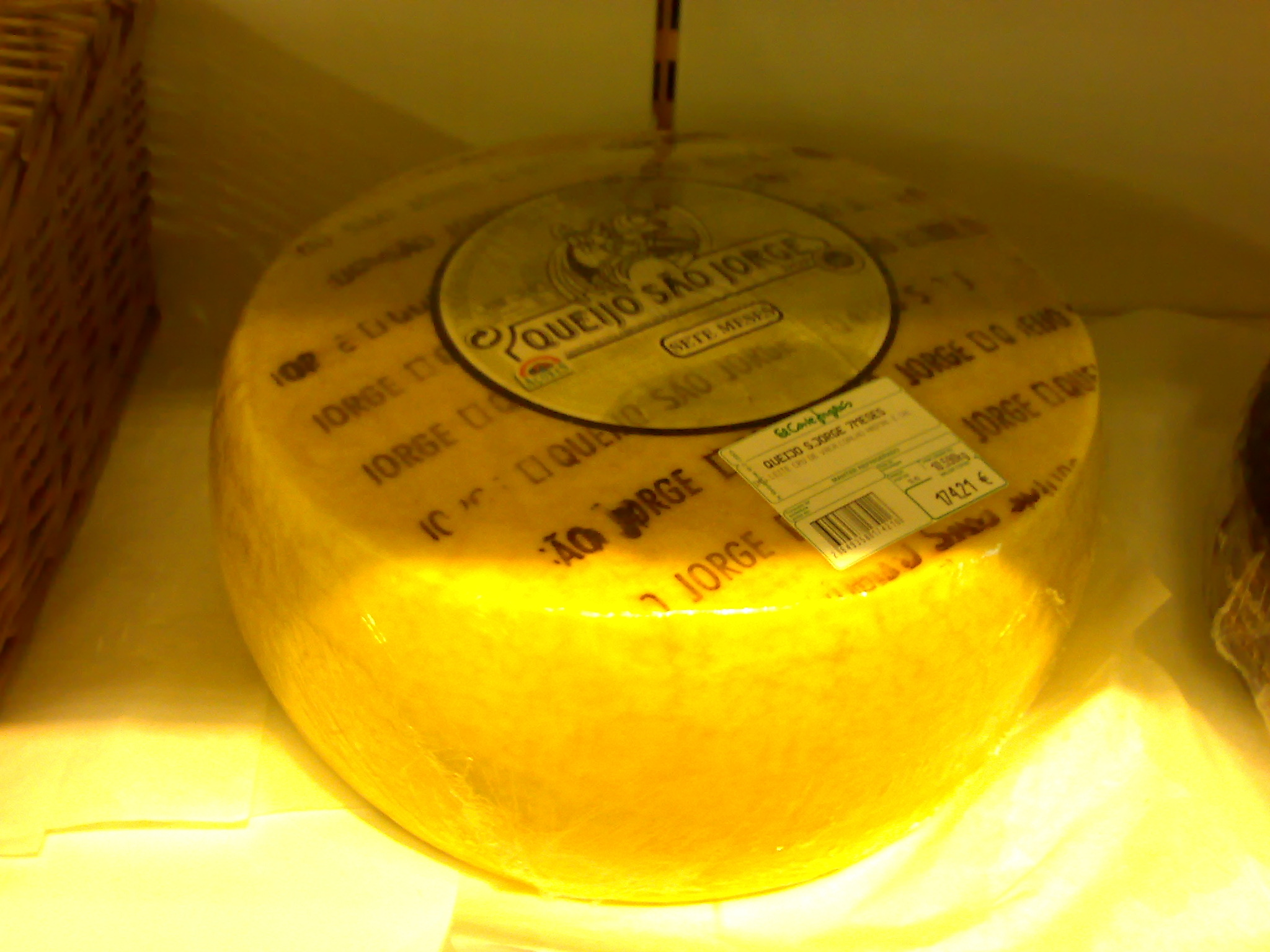
Queijo São Jorge

- Queijo de Azeitão (PDO)
- Queijos da Beira Baixa (PDO)
  - Queijo Amarelo da Beira Baixa (PDO)
  - Queijo de Castelo Branco (PDO)
  - Queijo Picante da Beira Baixa (PDO)
- Queijo de Cabra Transmontano (PDO)
- Queijo de Évora (PDO)
- Queijo de Nisa (PDO)
- Queijo do Pico (PDO)
- Queijo Rabaçal (PDO)
- Queijo São Jorge (PDO)
- Queijo Serpa (PDO)
- Queijo Serra da Estrela (PDO)
- Queijo Terrincho (PDO)
- Queijo mestiço de Tolosa (PGI)

=== Other dairy products ===
- Requeijão da Beira Baixa (PDO)
- Requeijão da Serra da Estrela (PDO)
- Travia da Beira Baixa (PDO)

== Confectionery ==
=== Pastry ===
- Ovos Moles de Aveiro (PGI)
- Pastel de Tentúgal (PGI)

== Others ==
=== Salt ===
- Sal de Tavira or Flor de Sal de Tavira (PDO)

== See also ==
- Portuguese cuisine
- Denominação de Origem Controlada
