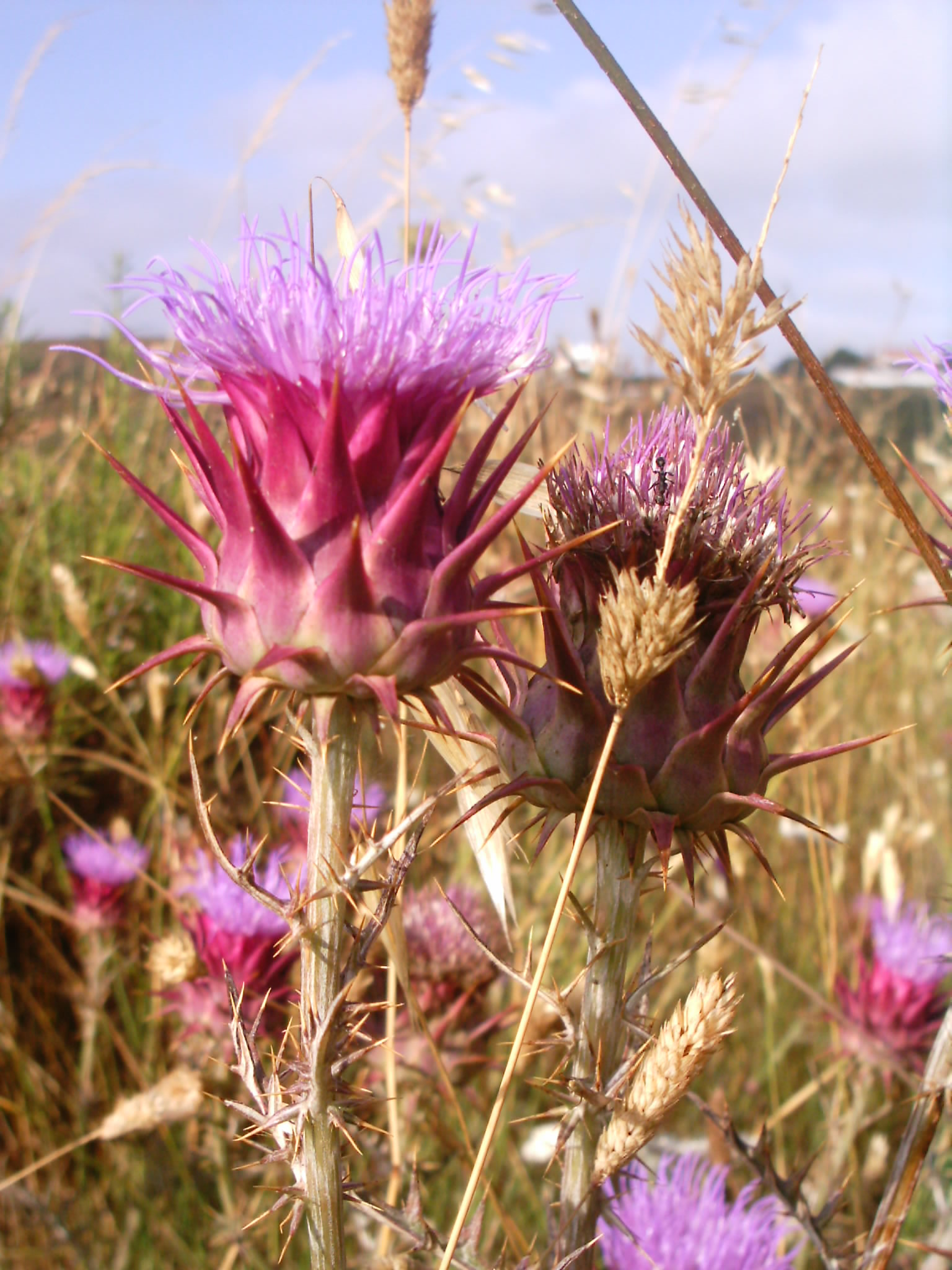
- Cynara algarbiensis on the Southwest Alentejo and Vicentine Coast Natural Park

Scientific classification
- Kingdom: Plantae
- Clade: Embryophytes
- Clade: Tracheophytes
- Clade: Spermatophytes
- Clade: Angiosperms
- Clade: Eudicots
- Clade: Asterids
- Order: Asterales
- Family: Asteraceae
- Genus: Cynara
- Species: C. algarbiensis

Binomial name
- Cynara algarbiensis Coss. ex Mariz

= Cynara algarbiensis =

Species of flowering plant

Cynara algarbiensis is a species of flowering plant in the artichoke genus Cynara. It is endemic to the Iberian Peninsula and can be found in Southern Portugal and Southwest Spain.
