= Serra da Estrela cheese =

Portuguese cheese

Serra da Estrela
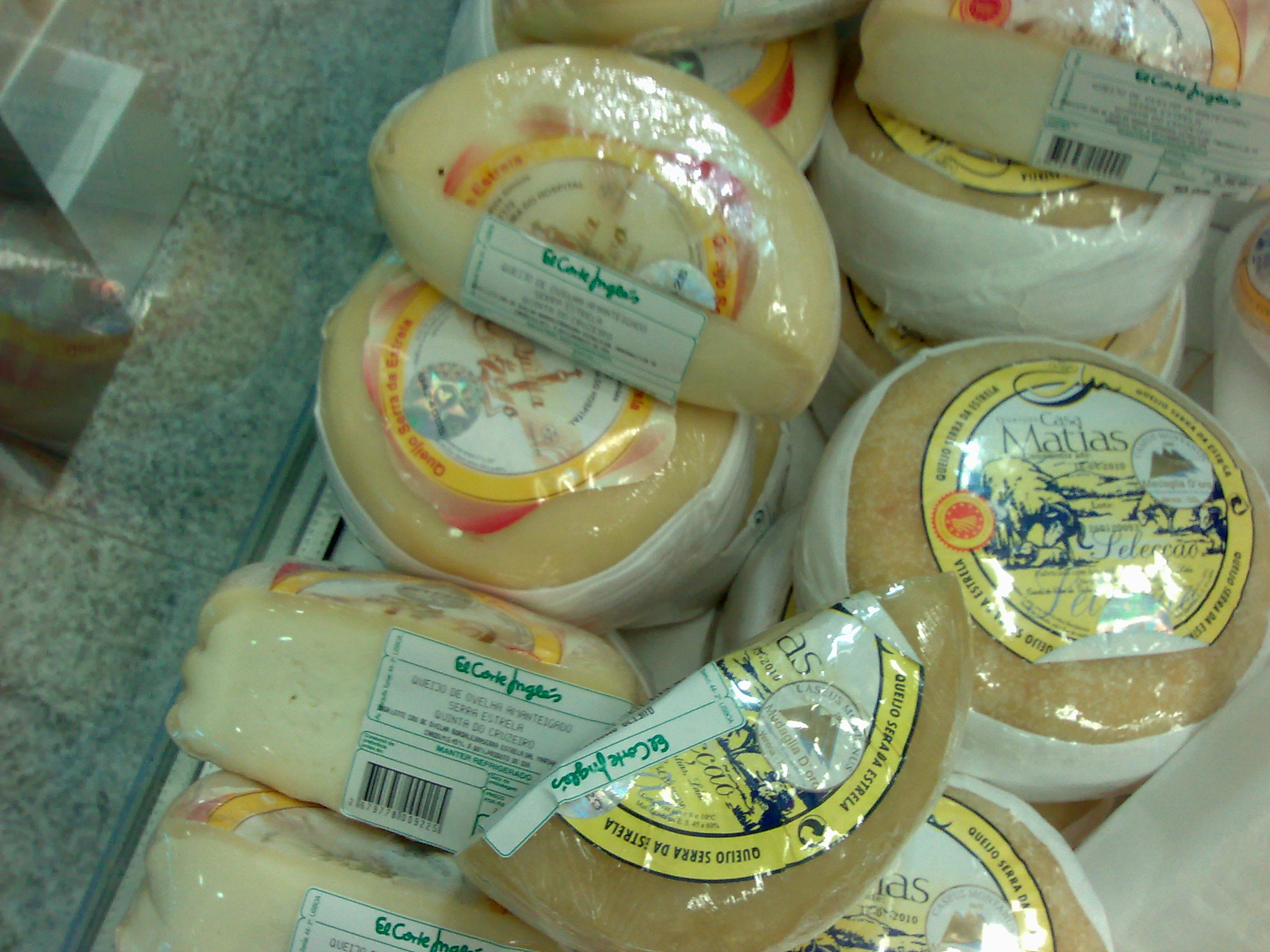
- Other names: Queijo da Serra
- Country of origin: Portugal
- Region: Serra da Estrela
- Source of milk: Ewes
- Texture: Soft to Semi-hard
- Certification: PDO 1996

Serra da Estrela cheese (Queijo Serra da Estrela) is a cheese made in the mountainous region of Serra da Estrela in Portugal. Under the name "Queijo Serra da Estrela" it is a Protected designation of origin (PDO) in the European Union as well as the UK.

The region where the Serra da Estrela cheese can be manufactured is limited to an area of 3,143.16 km^{2} (1,213.58 sq mi), which comprises the municipalities of Celorico da Beira, Fornos de Algodres, Gouveia, Mangualde, Manteigas, Nelas, Oliveira do Hospital, Penalva do Castelo, Carregal do Sal and Seia.

== Manufacturing ==
The production of the cheese has to follow very rigorous rules. It is made from sheep's milk, mostly during the months of November to March. Its maturation period has specific norms and must last a minimum of thirty days. The texture of the paste varies depending on its age, from a very soft semi-liquid when young, to a soft but sliceable solid when older. It is a cured cheese created by artisanal producers with a white or slightly yellow color and a uniform creamy consistency with at most a few small holes in it. Its particular qualities result from slow draining of curdled raw sheep's milk which has been coagulated by using local Cynara cadunculus thistle rather than rennet.

The cheese is formed into a somewhat irregular wheel with slightly bulging sides and upper surface. It typically has a soft well-formed rind, smooth and thin with a uniform straw-yellow colour and is traditionally bound in cloth.

== Ark of Taste ==
In 2014, Serra da Estrela cheese was boarded in the international catalogue of endangered heritage foods, Ark of Taste, which is maintained by the global Slow Food movement.

== See also ==
- List of Portuguese cheeses with protected status
