= São Jorge cheese =

Portuguese cheese

Queijo São Jorge
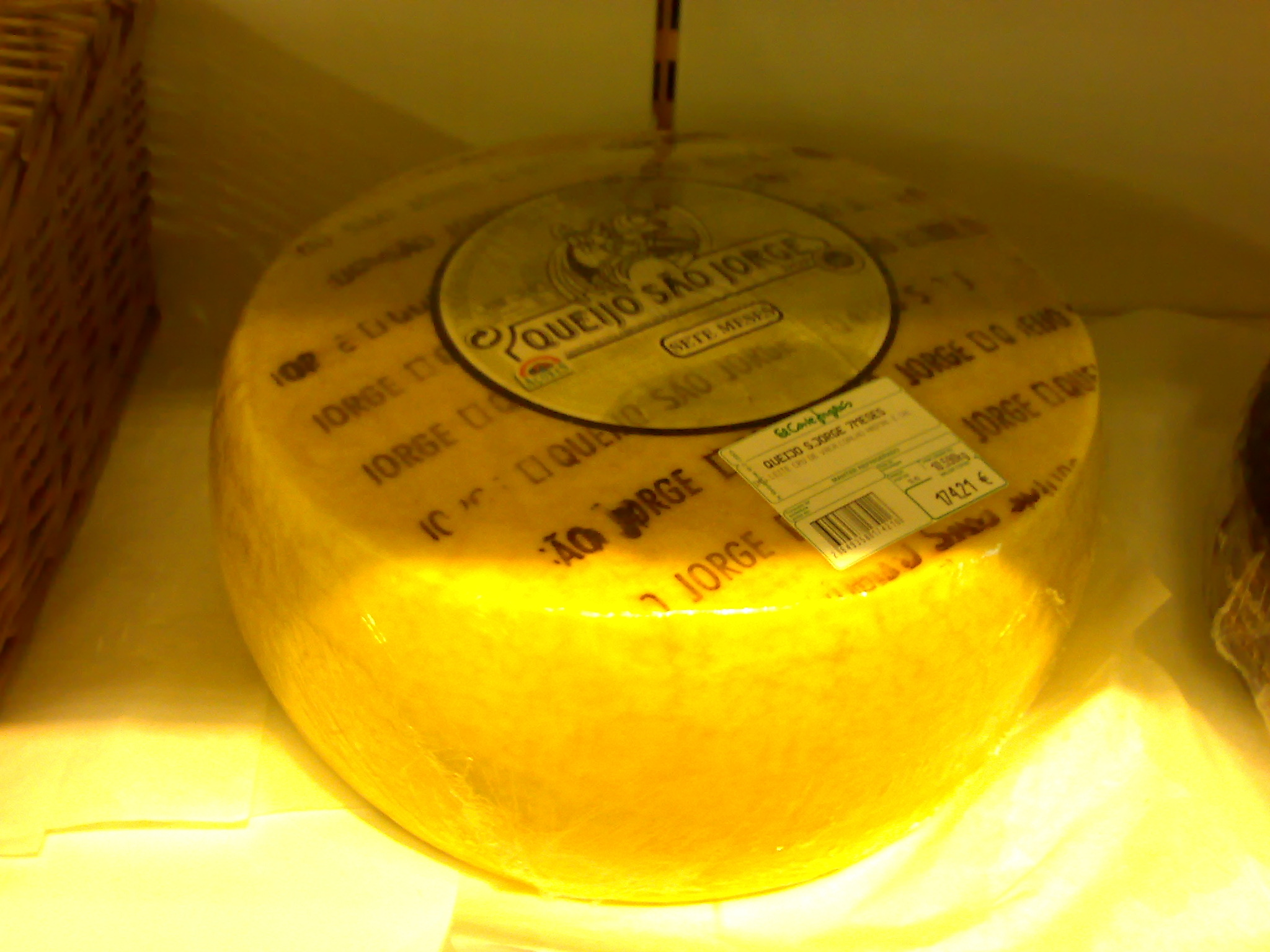
- Other names: São Jorge Cheese
- Country of origin: Portugal
- Region: São Jorge (Azores)
- Source of milk: Dairy cattle
- Pasteurised: No
- Texture: Hard; Semi-Hard
- Fat content: Minimum fat content of 45%
- Dimensions: 25–35 centimetres (9.8–13.8 in) diameter and 10–15 centimetres (3.9–5.9 in) height
- Weight: 8–12 kilograms (18–26 lb)
- Aging time: Minimum 3 months
- Certification: Denominação de Origem Protegida (DOP), attributed to Queijo São Jorge.

São Jorge Cheese (Portuguese: Queijo São Jorge) is a semi-hard to hard cheese, produced on the island of São Jorge, in the Portuguese archipelago of the Azores, certified as a Região Demarcada do Queijo de São Jorge (Demarcated Region of the Cheese of São Jorge) and regulated as a registered Denominação de Origem Protegida (Denomination of Protected Origin).

== History ==
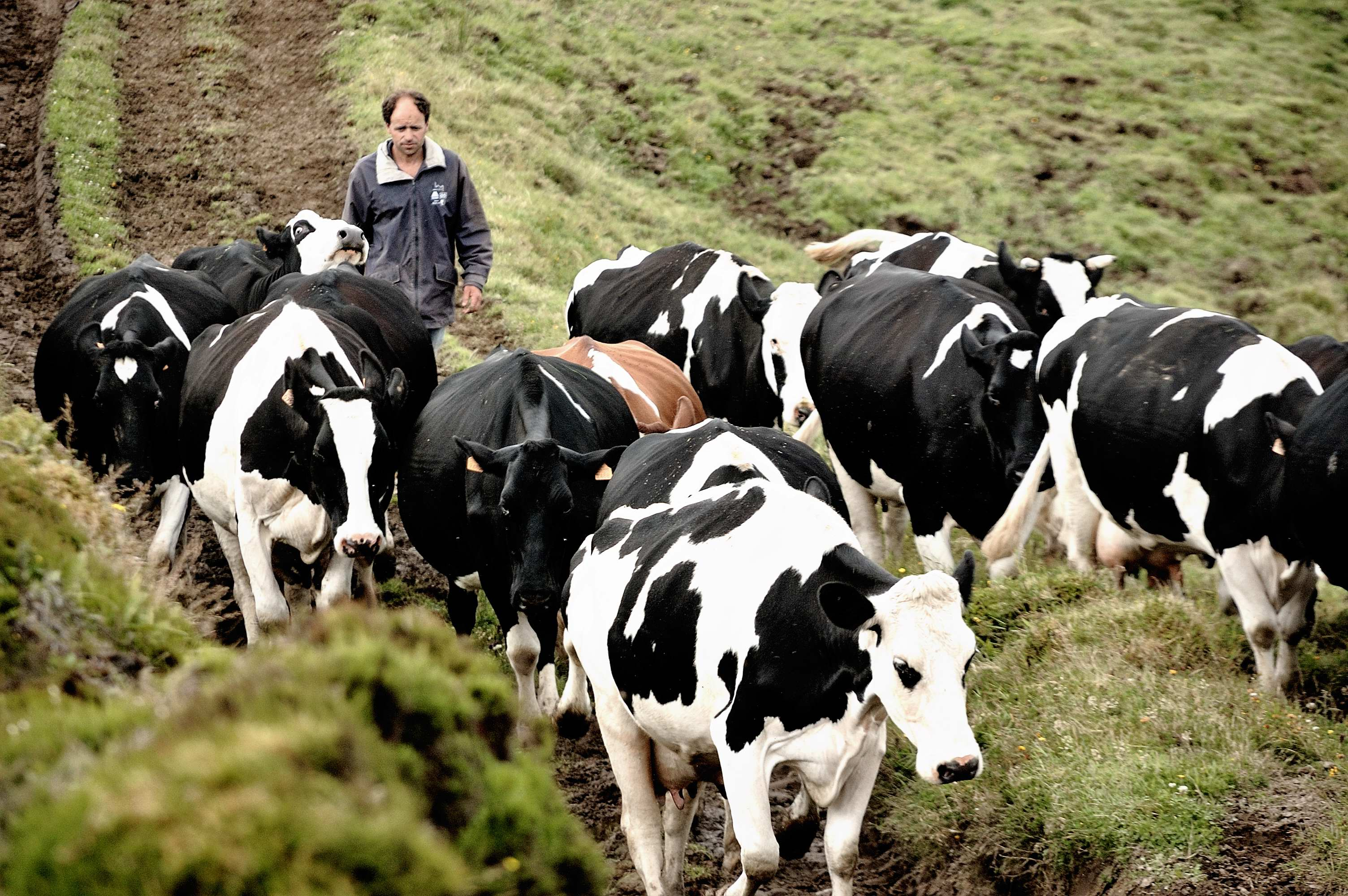
Some Holstein-Friese cattle commonly used in milk production in the Azores

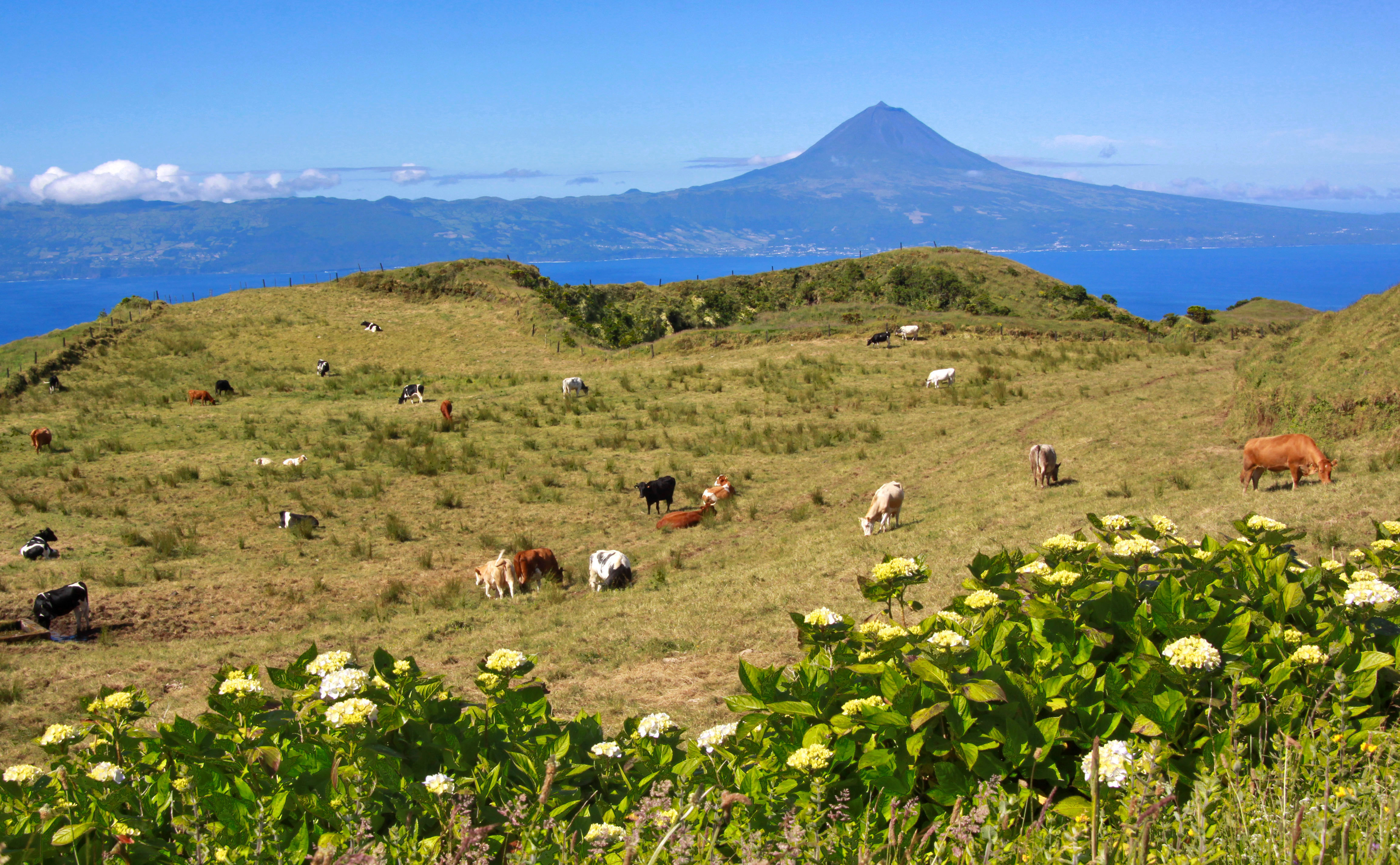
Dairy cattle in the high-altitude central plateau of São Jorge used in dairy production

The beginning of the cheese sector began at the time of the islands' settlement, with transport of domesticated cattle. The historian Gaspar Frutuoso noted that after colonization on São Jorge, "On it were dairy cattle, sheep and goats, from which they make many cheeses all year, which is the best of all the islands of the Azores, because of the pastures..." The connection between the quality of the cheese and the pasture-lands was confirmed over history, by studies by agronomists.

The climatic conditions and their effect on pasture-lands meant that there was more milk production then was needed for a subsistence economy. The inhabitants, therefore, resorted to the manufacture of cheese as a food reserve and manner of using excess milk production. Moreover, the cheeses of São Jorge (beyond the skill and knowledge of Jorgense cheese-makers) was attributed to the natural intercropping of grasses and legumes, that characterized the middle altitude areas.

Over the course of settlement, though, the presence of Flemish settlers (among the first settlers, captained by Willem van der Haegen) influenced the direction that cheese production advanced. These colonists found the higher altitude similar to their former lands, which were used for cattle-raising and dairy grazing.

José Pereira da Cunha da Silveira e Sousa Júnior, an agronomer and one of the largest producers of cheeses in the 19th century, wrote (1887) that:

In São Jorge, nicknamed the land of cheese, is where, for more than a century, they have handily manufactured milk, has in fact, well multiplied the number of manufacturers.

This implied, witnessed by the municipal records and the island's monasteries, that by the middle of the 18th century, the production of cheese had expanded significantly, exporting to the rest of the islands in the archipelago and abroad, that included the queijo da terra (the embryonic Queijo São Jorge), that was similar to the Flemish cheese at the time.

This distinction evolved, under the influence of the Cunha da Silveira family, great property-owners and producers of cheese, introduced a few improvement in technology, with the introduction of new techniques from abroad. It was this way that: "São Jorge received in this epoch a visit from a Habsburg profession...Fernand Ranchel, who established in the fields of Loural, alongside the settlement of Toledo, where he dedicated a factory to the production of a hard cheese, certainly the model for the Queijo de São Jorge, known as the Queijo da Terra, that substituted the first types of soft and semi-hard hitherto used by the cottage industry. This fact dated to the beginning of the last century."

The cheese acquired its current shape by the end of the 18th century; it was a cylindrical, voluminous, "wheel"-shaped cheese, with some produced in special formats (at the sizes and weights that were necessary for transport). Ernesto Rebelo, referred to a cheese for a gift, of enormous proportions, that the nobleman Jorge da Cunha had ordered in São Jorge for his friend D. José Pegado de Azevedo, Bishop of Angra, when he visited the island of Faial.

The Queijo são Jorge was, because of its historical importance, protected in 1986 with the creation of the Região Demarcada do Queijo de São Jorge (Demarcated Region of the Cheese of São Jorge) and regulated as a registered Denominação de Origem Protegida (DOP), attributed to the brand Queijo São Jorge. About 1800 tonnes of cheese are produced annually, from 800 producers among nine milk processing cooperatives. This means that the cheese of São Jorge is one of the pillars of the island economy, despite the constant management problems that have affected the industry. In 1991, a confraternity, named the Confraria do Queijo de São Jorge, whose role was sampling of cheeses for certification, by the Uniqueijo Cooperative.

== Production ==
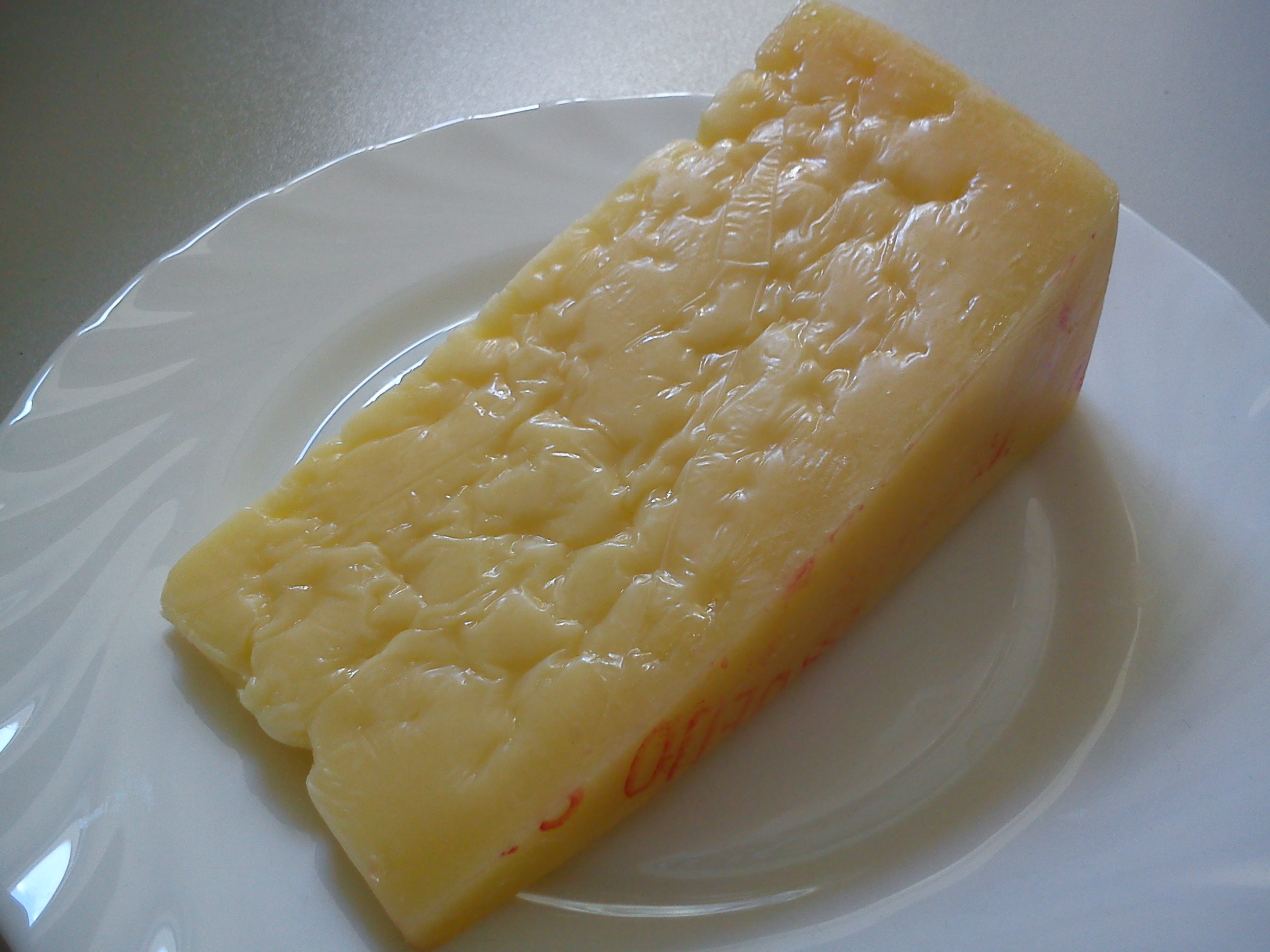
A slice of São Jorge cheese, showing the consistency and appearance after curing

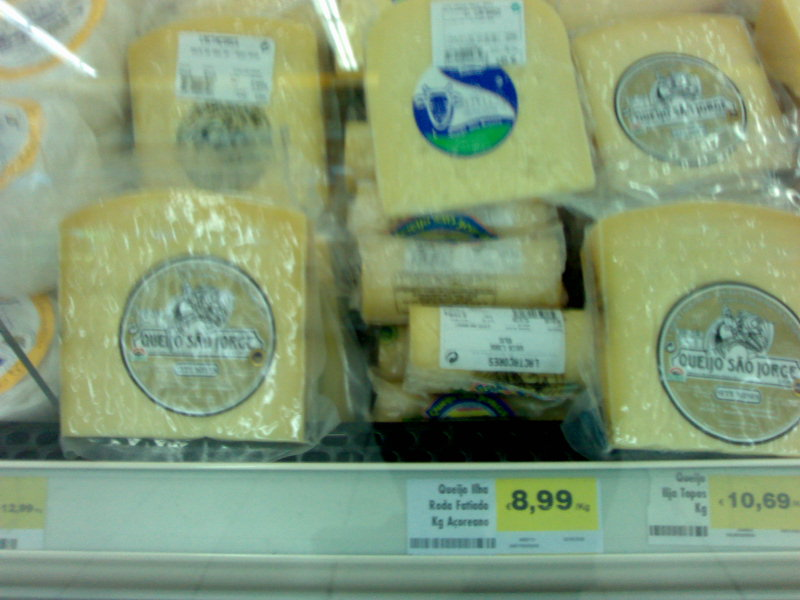
Various brands of "São Jorge"-type cheese, including one of the many brands endemic to the DOP

Queijo São Jorge is produced exclusively with raw dairy milk, produced on the island of São Jorge. The milk is coagulated into curd, after catalysing by acidification, from a lacto-serum obtained from previous manufacturing.

The curd thus achieved is left to stand until the mass has reached the desired consistency, then extract lacto-serum, focusing on the dry mass, to which is added refined good quality salt, at the ratio of 2.8% by weight. The curd is formed into circular wheels, numbered consecutively and a code assigned to each producer, which allows you to determine the age, manufacturer and other elements required for final quality control of the cheese.

The cheese is then dried in chambers to cure at ambient temperature over the following months, then on to acclimatized chambers, where they remain for the 90 days. Special editions of the cheese have been produced with cures of up to 36 months.

The cheeses after this process are selected for their quality and respect for the certification requirements, passing through a chamber of tasters, and then warehoused at low temperatures until sold to the market.

== Characteristics ==
In terms of the regional regulation certifying the demarcation of the cheese, the Queijo São Jorge must satisfy the following specifications:

- The cheese must be exclusively produced on the island of São Jorge and must be a cured, firm consistency, yellowish, hard or semi-hard cheese, with small and irregular holes spread in mass, to submit a brittle structure, obtained by draining and pressing after coagulation, exclusively of a curd made from whole or raw cow milk;
- The milk curd is hard or semi-hard, fat, with a 49% to 63% moisture content, referred to as fat-free cheese, with a minimum fat content of 45% (dry weight basis), with a minimum period of three months cure;
- The cheese has a cylindrical, regular shape, type "wheel" with dimensions that fluctuate between 25–35 cm (9.8–13.8 in) diameter and 10–15 cm (3.9–5.9 in) height;
- The rind of the cheese has a hard consistency, dark yellow colour, sometimes with reddish-brown spots, and smooth appearance, well-formed, with or without paraffin covering or other appropriate colourless plastic coatings;
- The cheese has a firm texture, sometimes brittle, yellowish, with many irregular small eyes and unevenly distributed in the mass;
- It has an aroma and flavour characterized by a strong clean bouquet, slightly spicy, features which are accentuated with aging;
- The cheese weighs between 8–12 kilograms (18–26 lb).
- The cheese must undergo a natural maturation or in climate-controlled conditions with air temperatures between 12–14 °C (54–57 °F), with a relative humidity of 80% to 85% and moderate ventilation for a minimum cure time or maturation of three months.

== See also ==
- List of Portuguese cheeses with protected status
