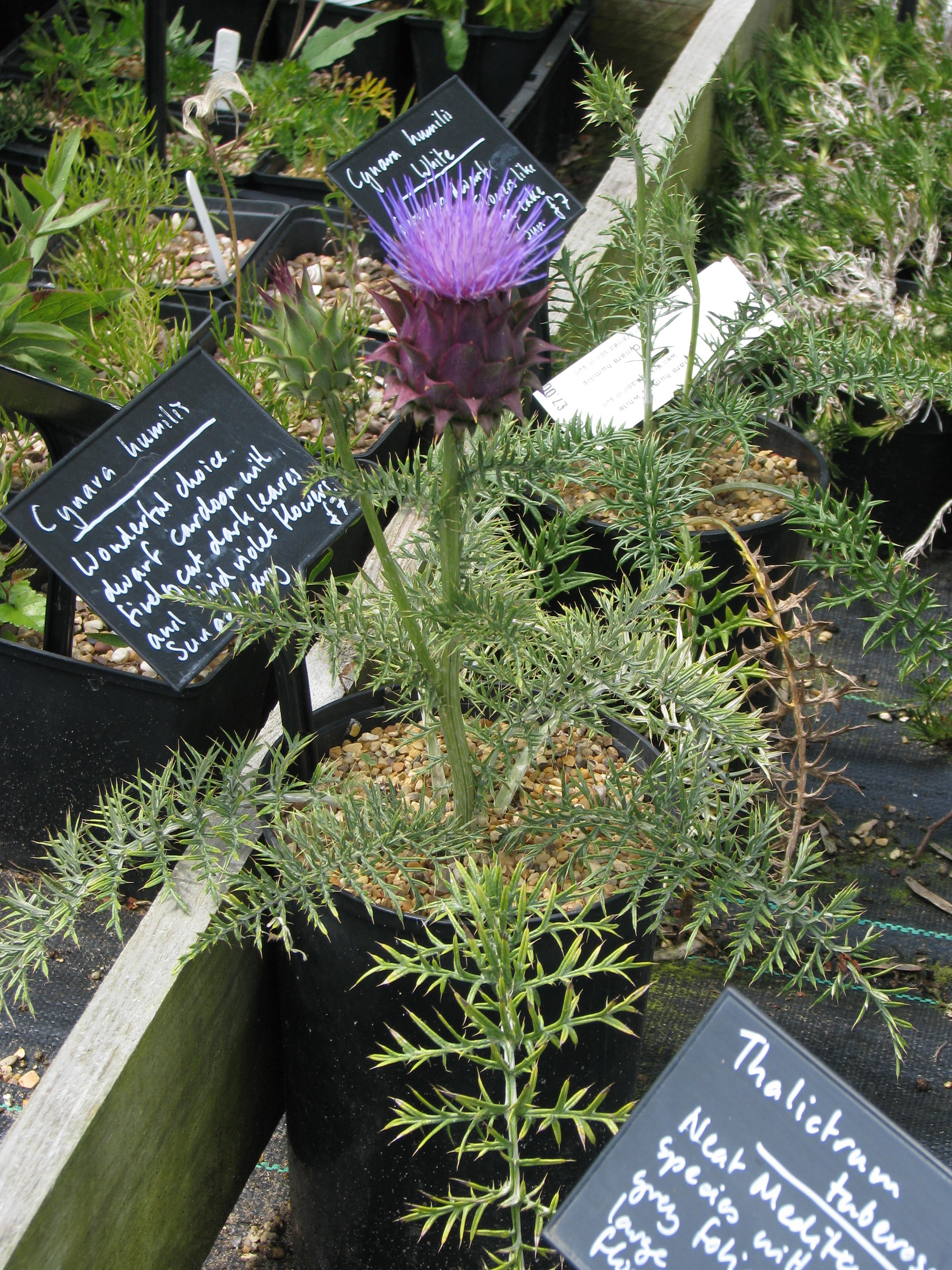

Scientific classification
- Kingdom: Plantae
- Clade: Embryophytes
- Clade: Tracheophytes
- Clade: Angiosperms
- Clade: Eudicots
- Clade: Asterids
- Order: Asterales
- Family: Asteraceae
- Genus: Cynara
- Species: C. humilis

Binomial name
- Cynara humilis L.

Synonyms
- Bourgaea humilis Coss.

= Cynara humilis =

Species of flowering plant

Cynara humilis, called wild thistle, is a species of flowering plant in the artichoke and cardoon genus Cynara native to Portugal, Spain, Morocco, Algeria and Gran Canaria, in the Canary Islands. It is used locally as a coagulant in artisanal sheep and goat cheesemaking.
