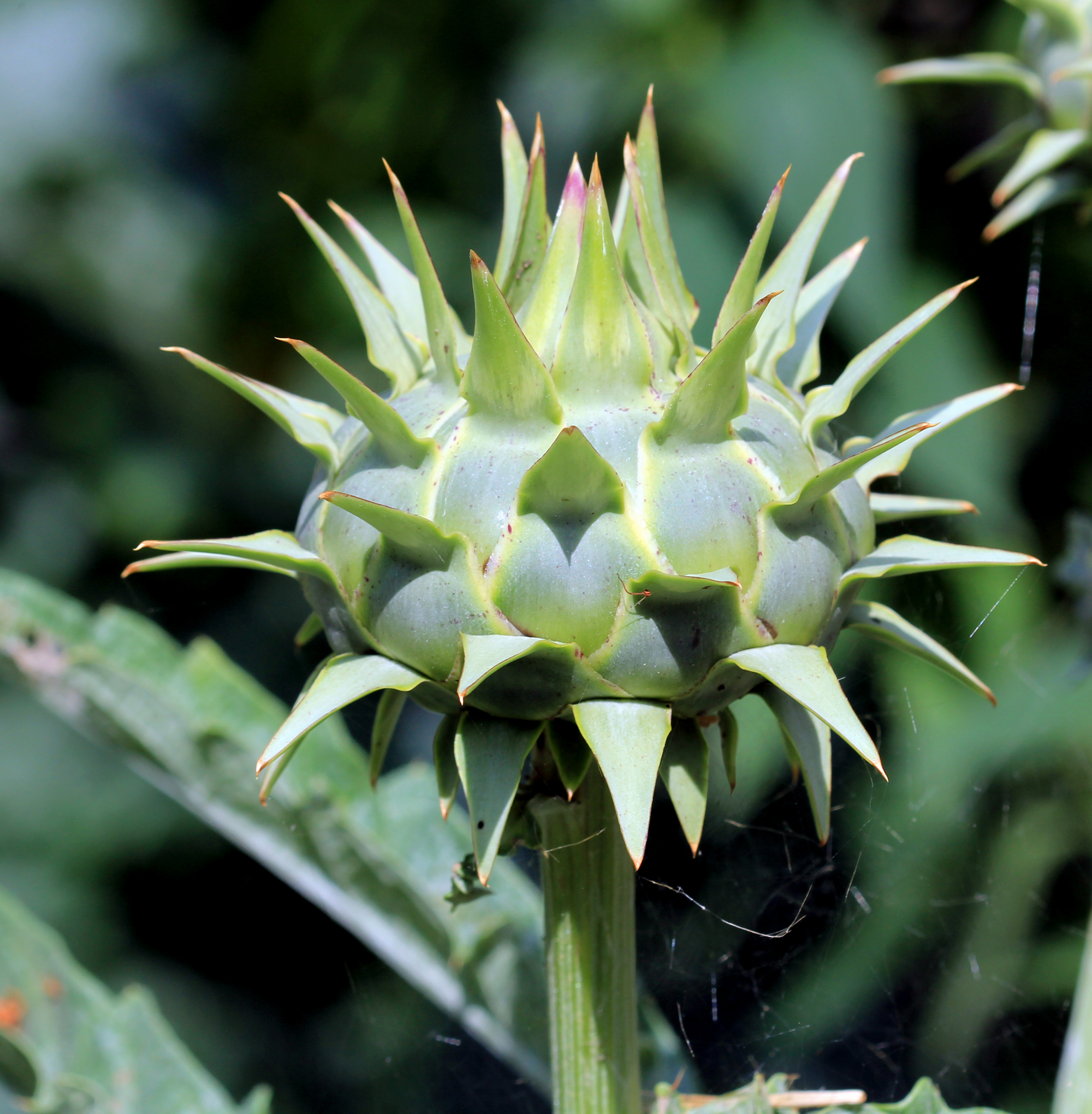
- Cynara cardunculus

Scientific classification
- Kingdom: Plantae
- Clade: Embryophytes
- Clade: Tracheophytes
- Clade: Spermatophytes
- Clade: Angiosperms
- Clade: Eudicots
- Clade: Asterids
- Order: Asterales
- Family: Asteraceae
- Subfamily: Carduoideae
- Tribe: Cardueae
- Subtribe: Carduinae
- Genus: Cynara; L.

Synonyms
- Arcyna Wiklund; Bourgaea Coss.; Cynaropsis Kuntze

= Cynara =

Genus of large, edible thistles

Cynara is a genus of thistle-like perennial plants in the family Asteraceae. They are native to the Mediterranean region, the Middle East, northwestern Africa, and the Canary Islands. The genus name comes from the Greek kynara, which means "artichoke".

Among the better known species in this genus include:

- Cynara cardunculus is the cardoon, artichoke thistle, or wild artichoke. The stems of cultivated varieties are used as food around the Mediterranean. It is also the source of a coagulant used as an alternative to rennet in the manufacture of cheese, with the advantage that the cheese is then fully suitable for vegetarians; many southern European cheeses are traditionally made in this way. The more commonly eaten globe artichoke is usually considered to be an ancient cultigen of this plant. Cardoon is an invasive species in United States, Argentina, and Australia.
- Cynara humilis is a wild thistle of southern Europe and north Africa which can be used in cheesemaking like C. cardunculus.
- Cynara scolymus (syn. C. cardunculus var. scolymus) is the common edible globe artichoke. It differs from C. cardunculus in that the leaf lobes and inner bracts of involucre are less spiny.
- Cynara cornigera leaves and flowers are eaten raw or cooked in Crete.

Cynara species are used as food plants by the larvae of many lepidopterans, such as the artichoke plume moth (Platyptilia carduidactyla), a pest of artichoke crops.

C. cardunculus is being developed as a new bioenergy crop in the Mediterranean because of its high biomass and seed oil yields even under harsh conditions.

== Species ==
The genus consists of the following species:

- Cynara algarbiensis - Spain, Portugal
- Cynara auranitica - Iraq, Iran, Lebanon, Syria, Israel, Jordan, Turkey
- Cynara baetica - Spain, Morocco
- Cynara cardunculus - cardoon - Mediterranean; naturalized in other regions
- Cynara cornigera - Greece, Libya, Cyprus, Egypt, Libya
- Cynara cyrenaica - Crete, Libya, Cyprus
- Cynara humilis - Spain, Portugal, Algeria, Morocco, Canary Islands
- Cynara makrisii
- Cynara scolymus (syn. C. cardunculus var. scolymus) - artichoke - area of origins unclear but probably Mediterranean; widely cultivated and naturalized
- Cynara syriaca - Cyprus, Iran, Lebanon, Syria
- Cynara tournefortii - Morocco, Spain, Portugal
