= Queijo de Nisa =

Portuguese cheese

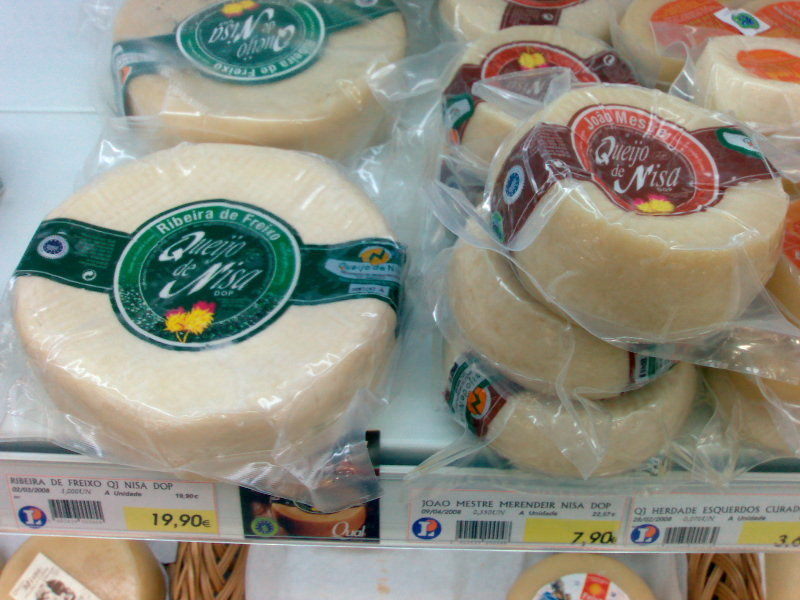
- Country of origin: Portugal
- Region: Alto Alentejo
- Town: Nisa
- Source of milk: Sheep
- Pasteurized: No
- Texture: semi-hard
- Weight: 200 g to 400 g (small) or 800 g to 1300 g (normal)
- Certification: PDO 1996

Queijo de Nisa is a semi-hard sheep's milk cheese from the municipality of Nisa, in the subregion of Alto Alentejo in Portugal. It is created from raw milk, which is coagulated, then curdled using an infusion of thistle. It is yellowish white, with a robust flavor and a somewhat acidic finish.

Since 1996, Nisa cheese has a protected geographical status. It is registered and has a Protected designation of origin (PDO) by the European Commission.

It was honored by the magazine Wine Spectator as one of the world's top 100 in an edition devoted to cheese: "100 Great Cheeses".

== See also ==
- List of Portuguese cheeses with protected status
