= Kenneth Berger Hearing Aid Museum and Archives =

Museum in Kent, Ohio, US

- Housed at: Kent State University
- Location: Kent, Ohio
- Website: https://www.kent.edu/ehhs/hs/spa/hearing-aid-museum

The Kenneth Berger Hearing Aid Museum and Archives is the world's largest collection of hearing aids located in the Department of Speech Pathology and Audiology at Kent State University. The collection features more than 3000 models of hearing aids.

== History ==
Kenneth W. Berger, Ph.D acted as the director of audiology at Kent State University for over 20 years. In a 1966 interview with the editor of the National Hearing Aid Journal, Dr. Berger was misquoted as announcing a plan to develop a hearing aid museum. Following the publication of the interview, donations of hearing aids were made to Dr. Berger. The donations were housed in Dr. Berger and his wife's home until space was made for the collection in the department of speech pathology and audiology at Kent State University. The department states that all items in the collection have been donated.

== Collection ==
The collection includes hearing aid models from six eras of hearing aids, as well as hearing aid technical data sheets, advertising, photographs, letters, house organs, and trade journals. Some notable items in the collection are noted below.

- Dahlberg D-10 Miracle Ear
- Globe Vactuphone
- Nicolet Phoenix
- Sonotone Perceptron
- Telex 20
- Zenith Arcadia
- Dahlberg D-14
- Ear Candle

== See also ==
- History of hearing aids
