= Manuel Joaquim Machado Rebelo =

Portuguese priest (1834–1930)

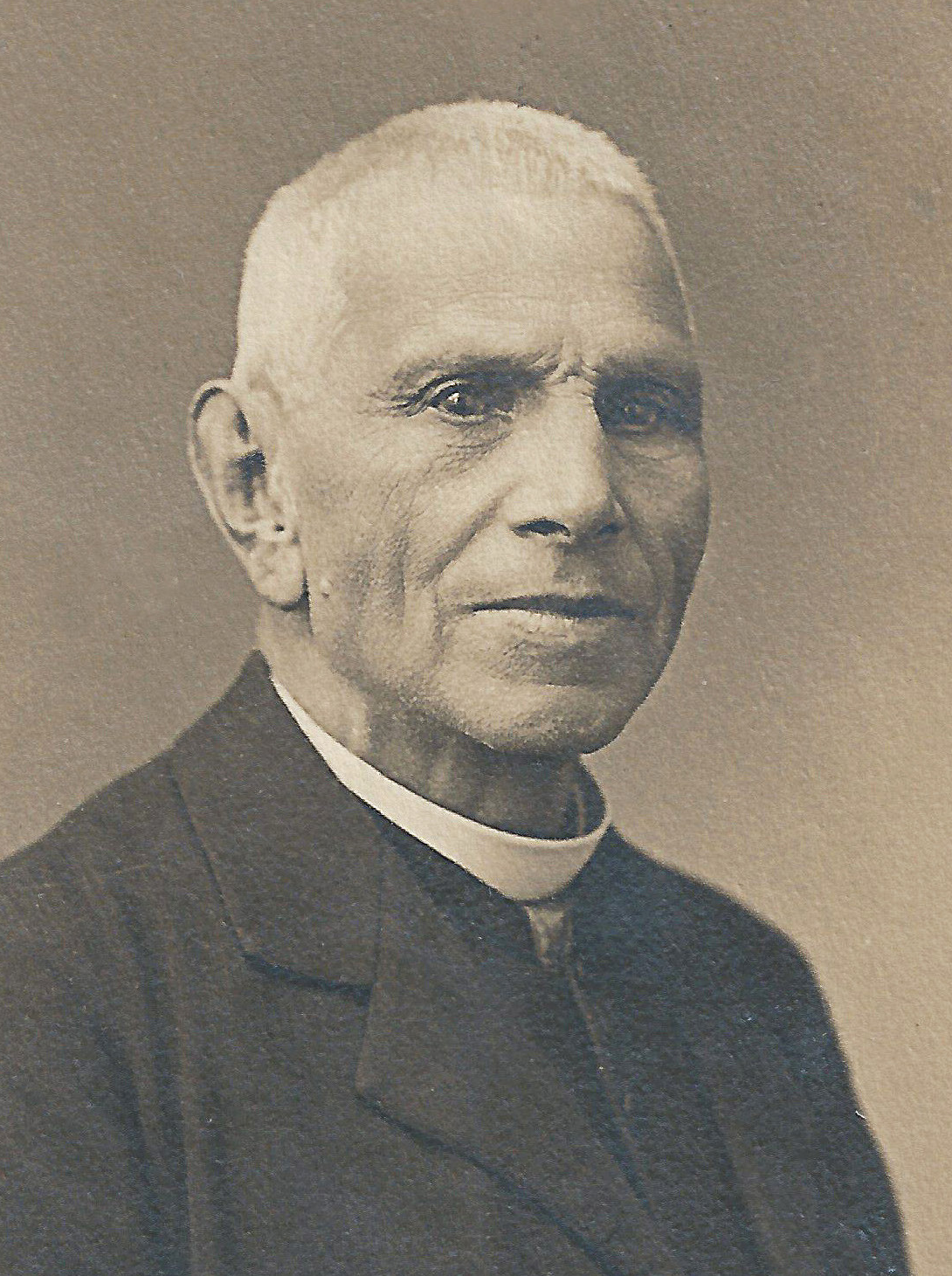
- Born: 29 March 1834; Turiz, Vila Verde, Portugal
- Died: 24 September 1930 (aged 96); Vila Verde, Portugal
- Occupation(s): Catholic priest, amateur cook
- Known for: Creator of Pudim Abade de Priscos
- Culinary career
- Cooking style: Portuguese Cuisine

Manuel Joaquim Machado Rebelo (Note: Or, Manoel Joaquim Machado Rebello, as it was spelled in his day, before the 1911 spelling reform.) (29 March 1834 – 24 September 1930), most commonly known as the Abbot of Priscos (Portuguese: Abade de Priscos), was a Portuguese priest who is best known as a famous amateur cook and a gastronomic reference in 19th-century Portugal. He is today mostly remembered as the creator of Pudim Abade de Priscos, a classic of Portuguese cuisine.

== Biography ==
Manuel Joaquim Machado Rebelo was born on 29 March 1834, in the civil parish of Santa Maria de Turiz, Vila Verde, the son of Manuel José Machado and Teresa Angélica Rebelo, landowners and proprietors of the Quinta do Arco estate. He had two brothers, Luís Manuel Machado Rebelo, also a clergyman, and Francisco José Machado Rebelo, whose daughter Maria Amélia Machado Rebelo (d. 22 May 1954) lived with uncle Manuel Joaquim, and was devoted to him like a father. He studied Theology in the Conciliar Seminary of the Apostles Saint Peter and Saint Paul, in Braga, and, after being ordained, celebrated his first Mass on 27 January 1861.

He was made a curate of São Miguel de Cunha, in Braga, on 3 March 1864, and the interim priest (vigário encomendado) of Bastuço, Barcelos, on 19 June of the same year. In 1868, he was made priest of Ruilhe, first in an interim capacity as a vigário encomendado, then was collated in 1874. It was around this time, by decree of 13 May 1874, that Father Rebelo was made an honorary chaplain of the Royal Household. After nine years in Ruilhe, he was collated as parish priest of Priscos in 1883; he would remain in that position for the 47 years that followed.

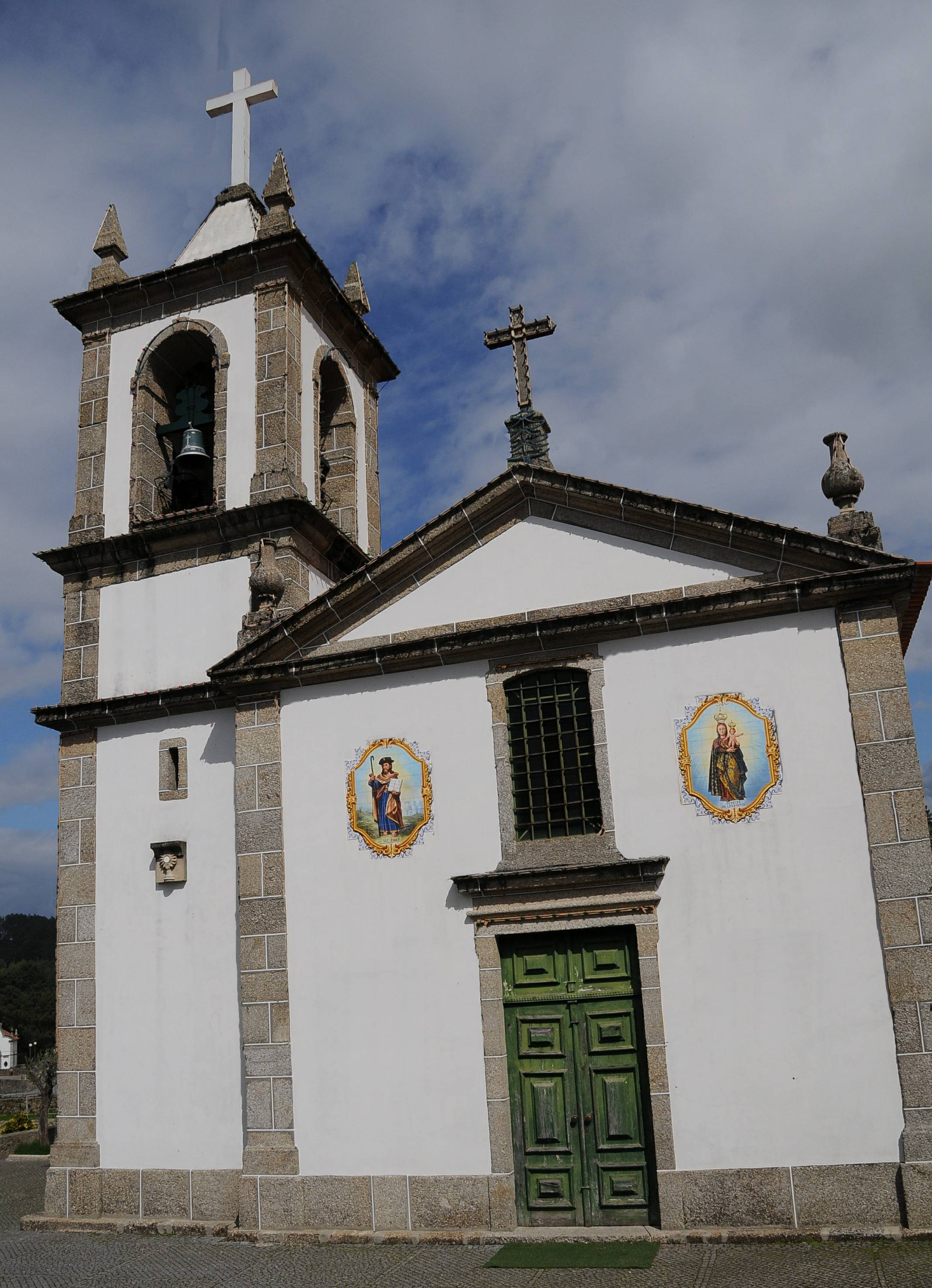
Parish Church of Priscos, Braga

As a priest, he was deeply devoted to the Most Sacred Heart of Jesus, and a dedicated almoner. However, he soon became known for his natural artistic faculties: at the age of thirty, in 1864, he had a wooden theatre built in São Miguel de Cunha and there directed several morality plays of his own composition, such as Taumaturgo Santo António ("Saint Anthony the Thaumaturge"), and A Casta Suzana ("The Chaste Susanna"). He was also a passionate photographer, setting up his own darkroom; he had an interest in optics, owning a Zeiss lens that he attempted to adapt to a camera obscura of his own making, but that he never got round to build, and spoke with enthusiasm about the magic lantern — speculating that, in the not-so-distant future, the projection of moving pictures would be "of paramount importance in the education of the people, and mainly children, on the mysteries of religion". He was also a gifted tailor and embroider.

Most of his notoriety came, however, from his expertise in the culinary arts. He frequently received distinguished visitors in his residence; on the most important religious festivals, the Abbot would frequently entertain important parishioners, distinguished ladies and gentlemen, and prelates: it did not take long until he was known all over the country as one of the greatest Portuguese cooks of the 19th century. He was chosen to oversee sumptuous feasts in honour of eminent figures of aristocracy, politics, arts and letters. Adapting it to the standards of Portuguese cuisine, he was a follower of the French school in style and technique: his main influences, Carême, Plumerey, Urban Dubois, Gouffé, Gustave Garlin, Gilbert Philéas, Montagné, Prosper Salles, and Auguste Escoffier.

On 3 October 1887, King Luís and the Royal Family (Queen Maria Pia, Prince Royal Carlos, Princess Royal Amelia, Infante Afonso, Duke of Porto, and the infant Luís Filipe, Prince of Beira), accompanied by Prime Minister José Luciano de Castro and other senior members of the government, visited Póvoa de Varzim. The local authorities invited the Abbot of Priscos to oversee the feast. After the meal, the King wanted to meet the Abbot and to thank him in person; reportedly, he inquired about the secret ingredient of a complicated dish, and was surprised to learn it was hay. This would not be the last dinner he would prepare to the Royal Family, however: one was especially rich in fanciful confectionary and decorative ornaments — the pièce de résistance was an enormous chocolate beehive, topped with angel hair imitating a thatched roof, and filled with honeycomb-shaped puddings and sugar bees with translucent wings. Queen Maria Pia and Princess Royal Amelia stood up to admire the detail and were astonished to learn it was entirely edible.

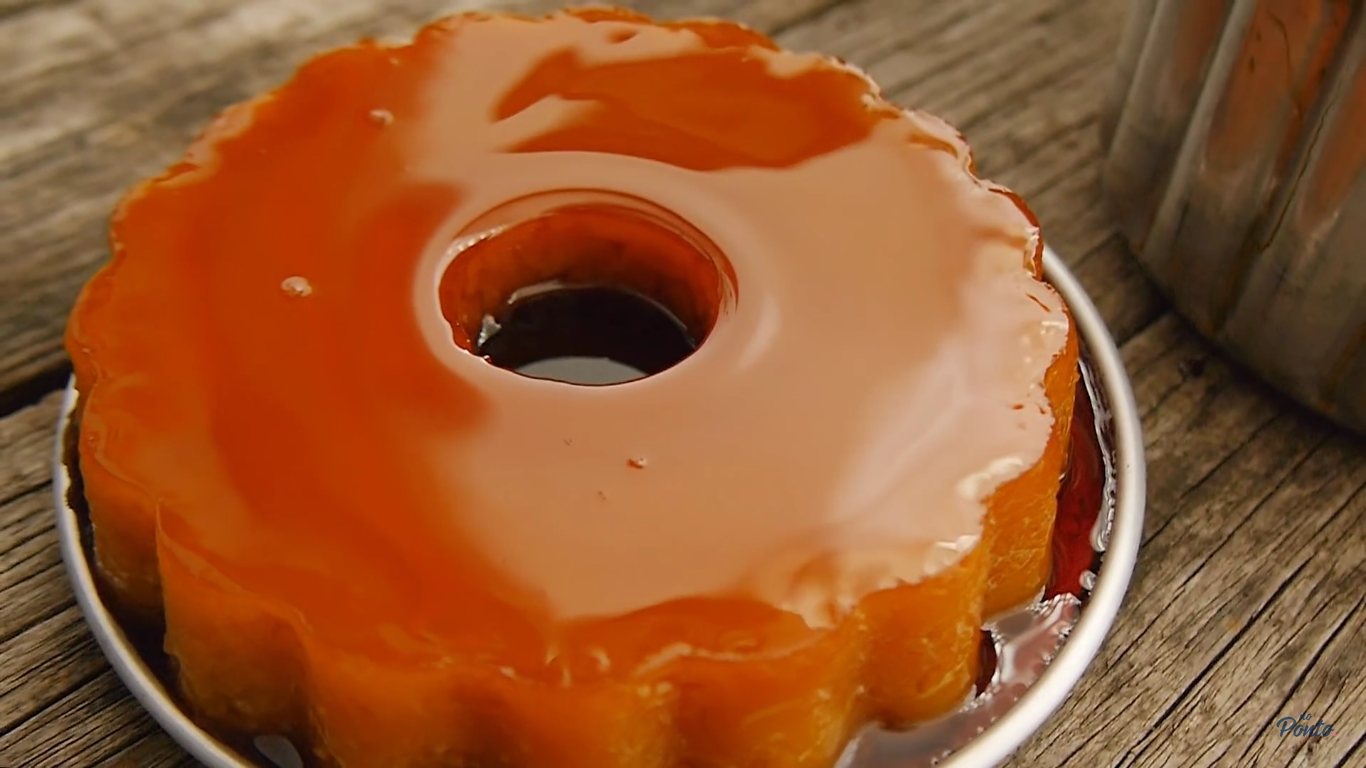
An Abbot of Priscos pudding

His most famous confection, however, was one of the few which recipe he actually publicised: the Pudim Abade de Priscos (Abbot of Priscos pudding). Mgr Manuel Pereira Júnior asked him to share a recipe to teach the schoolgirls at the primary school at the Congregados Convent.

By the 1910s, he was suffering from chronic hearing loss and had to resort to an ear trumpet; by 1917 he could no longer attend at the confessional. He died on 24 September 1930, at the age of 96.
