= Eccentricity (behavior) =

Unusual or odd behavior on the part of an individual

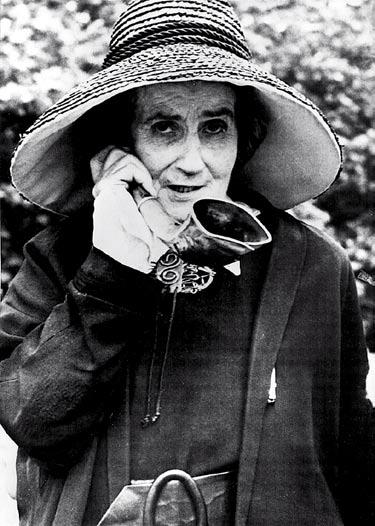
Madame de Meuron, a Swiss eccentric with her characteristic ear trumpet and hat.

Eccentricity (also called quirkiness) is unusual or odd behavior which deviates from normal behavior. This behavior would typically be perceived as unusual or unnecessary, without being demonstrably maladaptive. People who consistently display benignly eccentric behavior are labeled as "eccentrics".

== Etymology ==
From Medieval Latin eccentricus, derived from Greek ekkentros, "out of the center", from ek-, ex- "out of" + kentron, "center". Eccentric first appeared in English essays as a neologism in 1551, as an astronomical term meaning "a circle in which the earth, sun, etc. deviates from its center". Five years later, in 1556, the adjectival form of the word was used. In 1685, the definition evolved from the literal to the figurative, and eccentric is noted to have begun being used to describe unconventional or odd behavior. A noun form of the word— a person who possesses and exhibits these unconventional or odd qualities and behaviors— appeared by 1832.

== Depictions ==
Eccentricity is often associated with genius, intellectual giftedness, or creativity. People may perceive the individual's eccentric behavior as the outward expression of their unique intelligence or creative impulse. In this vein, the eccentric's habits are incomprehensible not because they are illogical or the result of madness, but because they stem from a mind so original that it cannot be conformed to societal norms. English utilitarian thinker John Stuart Mill wrote that "the amount of eccentricity in a society has generally been proportional to the amount of genius, mental vigour, and moral courage which it contained", and mourned a lack of eccentricity as "the chief danger of the time". Edith Sitwell wrote that eccentricity is "often a kind of innocent pride", also saying that geniuses and aristocrats are called eccentrics because "they are entirely unafraid of, and uninfluenced by, the opinions and vagaries of the crowd". Eccentricity is also associated with great wealth— what would be considered signs of insanity in a poor person, some may accept as eccentricity in wealthy people.

== Characteristics ==
Psychologist David Weeks believes people with a mental illness suffer from their behavior, while eccentrics are quite happy. He even opines that eccentrics are less prone to mental illness than everyone else.

According to Weeks' study, there are several distinctive characteristics that often differentiate a healthy eccentric person from a regular person or someone who has a mental illness. The first five characteristics on Weeks' list are found in most people regarded as eccentric:

- Nonconforming
- Creative
- Strongly motivated by curiosity
- Idealistic
- Happily obsessed with one or more hobbies (usually five or six)

Weeks also lists characteristics that some, but not all, eccentric people may exhibit:

- Aware from early childhood that they are different
- Intelligent
- Opinionated and outspoken
- Noncompetitive, not in need of reassurance or reinforcement from society
- Unusual in their eating habits and living arrangements
- Not interested in the opinions or company of other people
- Mischievous sense of humor
- Single
- Usually the eldest or an only child
- Bad speller

== See also ==
- Attention seeking
- Autism spectrum disorder
- Eight Eccentrics of Yangzhou
- English Eccentrics and Eccentricities
- Foolishness for Christ
- Idiosyncrasy
- Individualism
- Keep Austin Weird
- Loner
- Thinking outside the box
- Wallflower (person)
