= Fetoscope =

Fetoscope may refer to:

- the kind of endoscope used in fetoscopy
- fibreoptic scope for looking directly at the fetus, as opposed to a stethoscope used to listen the heart beat
- the Pinard horn fetal stethoscope
- Doppler ultrasound or Medical ultrasonography "wands"
