= Sonotone =

Sonotone may refer to:

- Sonotone (hearing aid)
- Sonotone, 2017 single by MC Solaar from his album Géopoétique
