= Pudim Abade de Priscos =

Portuguese pudding dessert

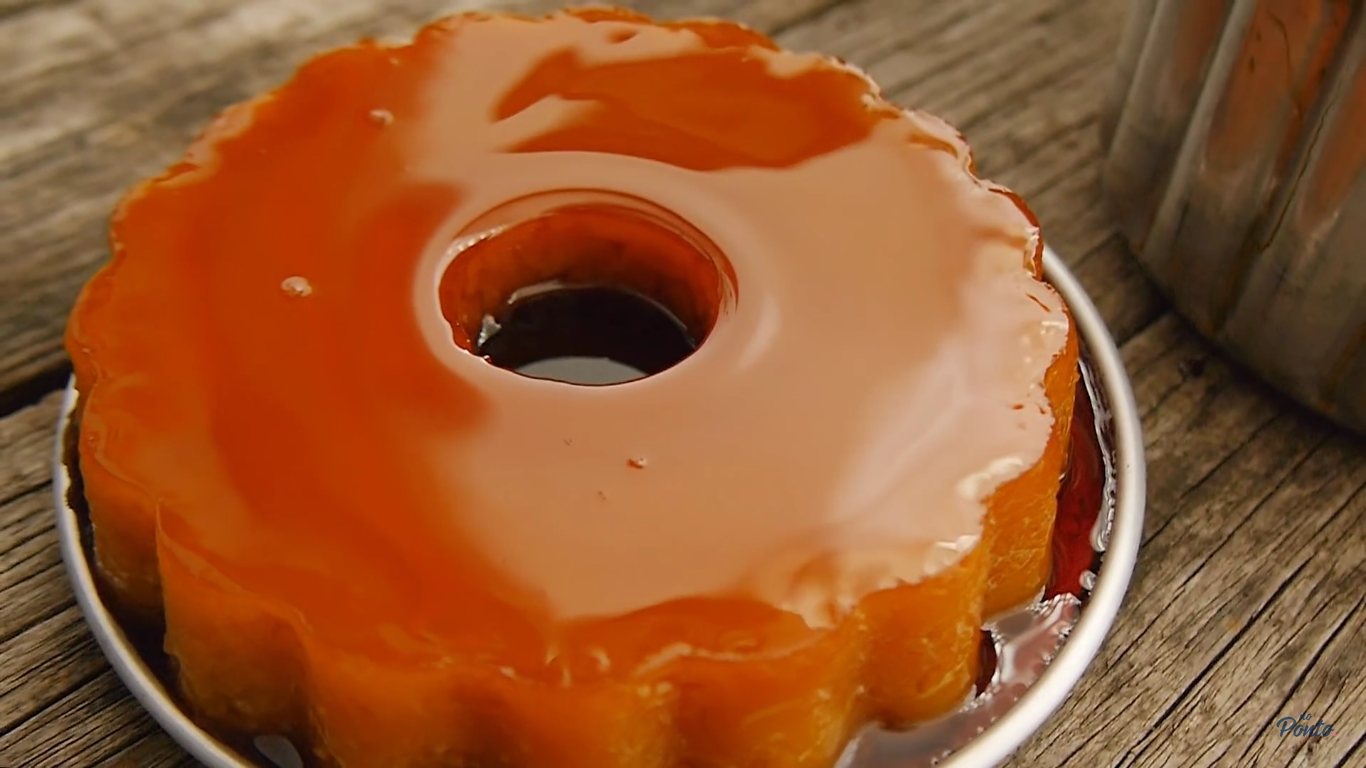
- Alternative names: Abbot of Priscos pudding
- Type: Pudding
- Course: Dessert
- Region or state: Portugal
- Created by: Manuel Joaquim Machado Rebelo
- Main ingredients: Eggs, sugar, Port wine, and presunto (fat layer)

Abbot of Priscos pudding (Portuguese: Pudim Abade de Priscos) is a typical Portuguese dessert, a rich crème caramel pudding created by Father Manuel Joaquim Machado Rebelo, the Abbot of Priscos, in the 19th century. The pudding is unique in that it contains bacon and a very large number of egg yolks — fifteen in total. According to its creator, "The pudding is rather easy to make, but difficult to get right."

In 2011, the Abbot of Priscos pudding was one of the runners-up in the Seven Wonders of Portuguese Gastronomy competition.

== Method of preparation ==
Sugar is mixed in water with lemon zest, a cinnamon stick, and a piece of fresh bacon. The syrup is brought to a boil and then passed through a strainer into a bowl with fifteen egg yolks and a small glass of tawny or vintage Port. The resulting mixture is then cooked in a bain-marie, in a mould lined with caramel.
