= History of hearing aids =

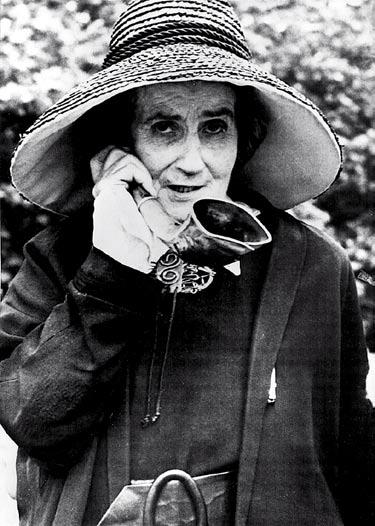
Madame de Meuron with ear trumpet

The first hearing aid was created in the 17th century. The movement toward modern hearing aids began with the creation of the telephone, and the first electric hearing aid was created in 1898. By the late 20th century, the digital hearing aid was distributed to the public commercially. Some of the first hearing aids were external hearing aids. External hearing aids direct sounds in front of the ear and block all other noises. The apparatus would fit behind or in the ear.

The invention of the carbon microphone, transmitters, digital signal processing chip or DSP, and the development of computer technology helped transform the hearing aid to its present form.

== Ear trumpet ==
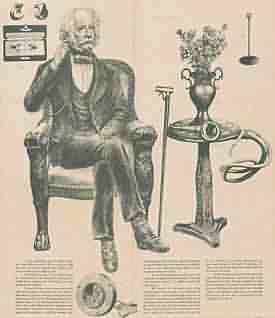
Frederick Rein's acoustic chair, designed for King John VI of Portugal in the early 19th-century.

The use of ear trumpets for the partially deaf dates back to the 17th century. By the late 18th century, their use was becoming increasingly common. Collapsible conical ear trumpets were made by instrument makers on a one-off basis for specific clients. Well-known models of the period included the Townsend Trumpet (made by the deaf educator John Townshend), the Reynolds Trumpet (specially built for painter Joshua Reynolds) and the Daubeney Trumpet.

The first firm to begin commercial production of the ear trumpet was established by Frederick C. Rein in London in 1800. As well as producing ear trumpets, Rein also sold hearing fans, and speaking tubes. These instruments helped amplify sounds, while still being portable. However, these devices were generally bulky and had to be physically supported from below. Later, smaller, hand-held ear trumpets and cones were used as hearing aids.

Ear trumpets were famously used by Beethoven around 1814 when the composer's hearing deteriorated. The ones that he used were made by his friend Johann Nepomuk Mälzel. Beethoven used these devices by placing the wider end toward a sound source, such as a piano or speaker, to amplify sound directly into his ear. Many of these are preserved in the Beethoven Museum in Bonn.

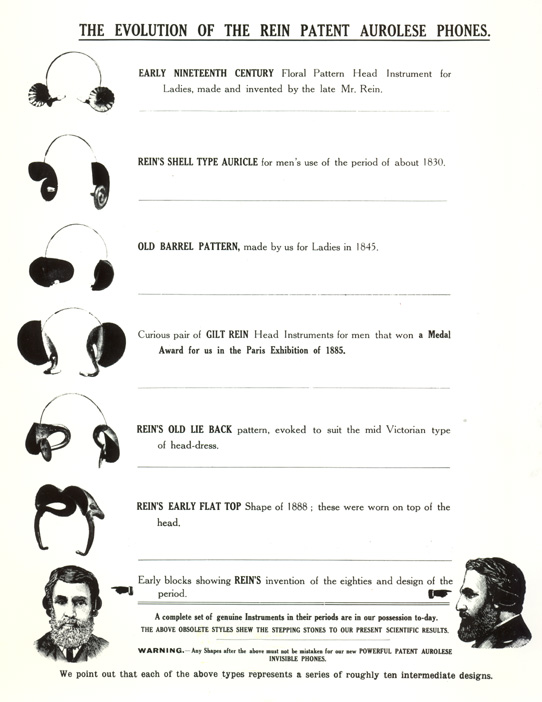
Frederick Rein Ltd.'s catalog, displaying evolving 19th century designs.

Rein was commissioned to design a special acoustic chair for the ailing King John VI of Portugal in 1819. The throne was designed with ornately carved arms that looked like the open mouths of lions. These holes acted as the receiving area for the acoustics, which were transmitted to the back of the throne via a speaking tube, and into the king's ear. Finally in the late 1800s, the acoustic horn, which was a tube that had two ends, a cone that captured sound, and was eventually made to fit in the ear.

Toward the late 19th century, hidden hearing aids became increasingly popular. Rein pioneered many notable designs, including his 'acoustic headbands', where the hearing aid device was artfully concealed within the hair or headgear. Reins' Aurolese Phones were headbands, made in a variety of shapes, that incorporated sound collectors near the ear that would amplify the acoustics. Hearing aids were also hidden in couches, clothing, and accessories. This drive toward ever increasing invisibility was often more about hiding the individual's disability from the public than about helping the individual cope with his or her problem.

== Electronic hearing aids ==
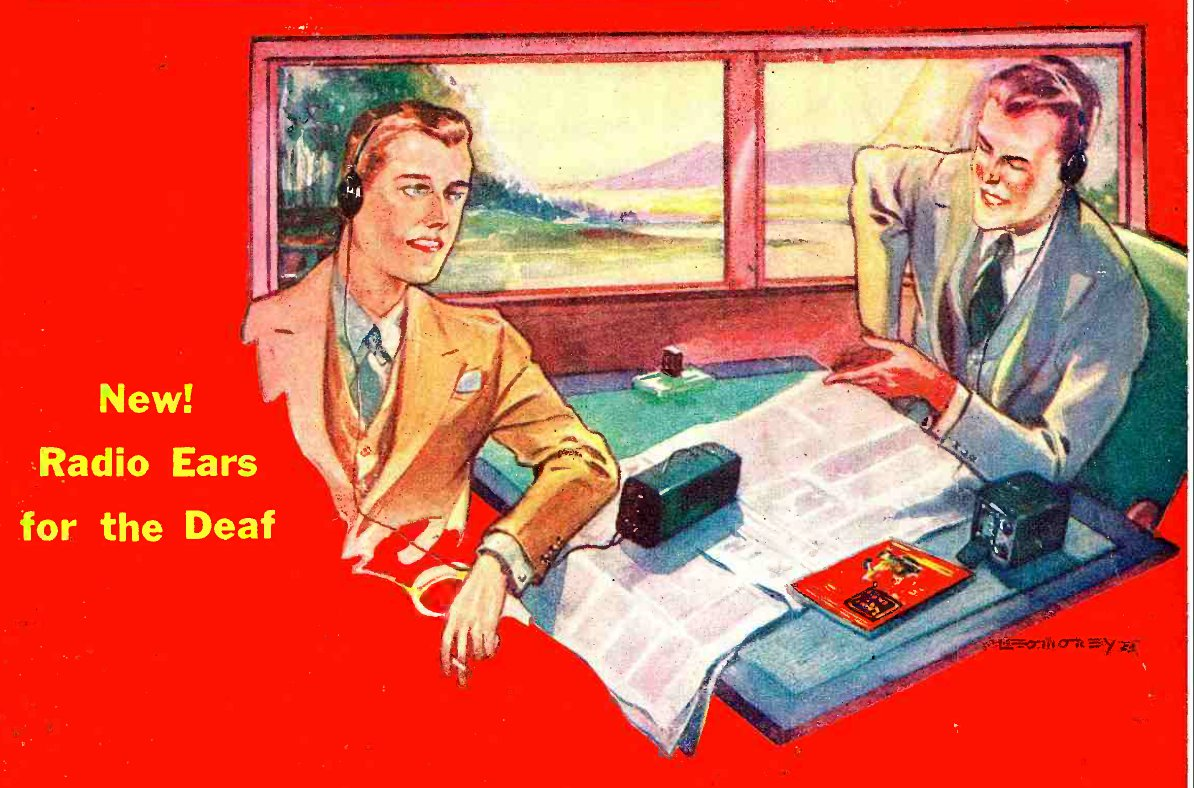
A 1933 ad for early vacuum tube hearing aids.

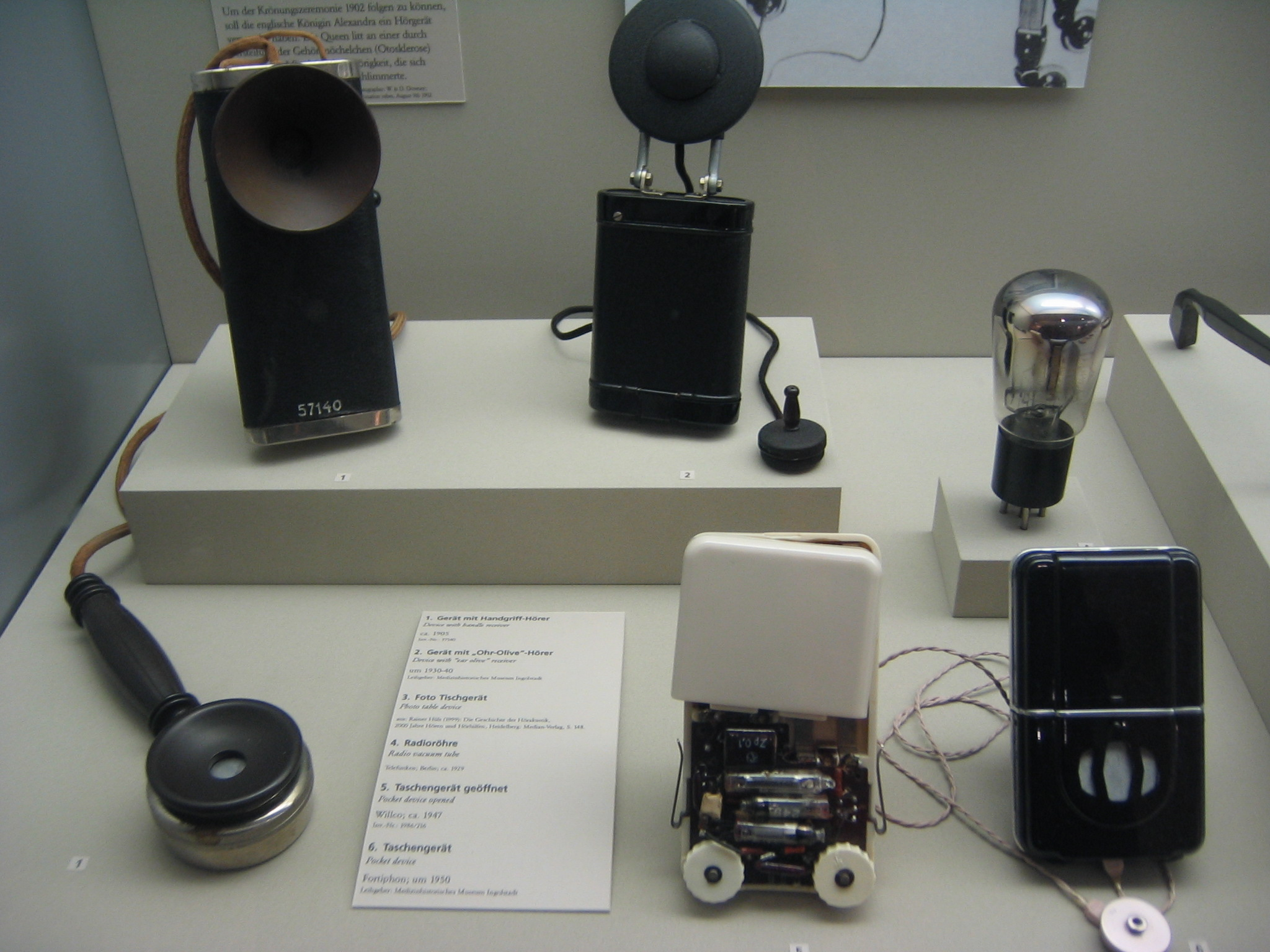
These German hearing aids date from around 1920 to 1950. They include an attachment similar to a telephone receiver. Museum of Medicine, Berlin, Germany.

The first electronic hearing aids were constructed after the invention of the telephone and microphone in the 1870s and 1880s. The technology within the telephone increased how acoustic signals could be altered. Telephones were able to control the loudness, frequency, and distortion of sounds. These abilities were used in the creation of the hearing aid.

The first electric hearing aid called the Akouphone, was created by Miller Reese Hutchison in 1898. It used a carbon transmitter, so that the hearing aid could be portable. The carbon transmitter was used to amplify sound by taking a weak signal and using electric current to make it a strong signal. These electronic hearing aids could eventually be shrunk into purses and other accessories.

One of the first manufacturers of the electronically amplified hearing aid was the Siemens company in 1913. Their hearing aids were bulky and not easily portable. They were about the size of a "tall cigar box" and had a speaker that would fit in the ear.

The first vacuum tube hearing aid was patented by a Naval engineer Earl Hanson in 1920. It was called the Vactuphone and used the telephone transmitter to turn speech into electrical signals. After the signal was converted, it would be amplified when it moved to the receiver. The hearing aid weighed seven pounds, which made it light enough to be carried. Marconi in England and Western Electric in the US began marketing vacuum tube hearing aids in 1923.

During the 1920s and 1930s, the vacuum tube hearing aid became more successful and began to decrease in size with better miniaturization techniques. The Acousticon's Model 56 was created in the mid-1920s and was one of the first portable hearing aid units, although it was quite heavy. The first wearable hearing aid using vacuum tube technology went on sale in England in 1936, and a year later in the United States. By the 1930s, hearing aids were becoming popular to the public. Multitone of London patented the first hearing aid to use automatic gain control. The same company introduced a wearable version in 1948.

Military technological advances that occurred in World War II helped the development of hearing aids. One of the major advances that World War II enabled was the idea of miniaturization. This could be seen by Zenith's pocket-sized Miniature 75.

== Transistor hearing aids ==
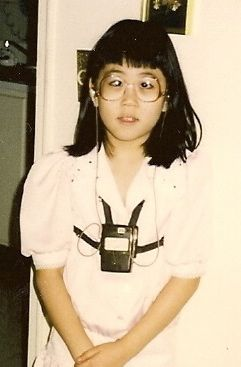
This early 1980s photo shows a transistorized hearing aid that is worn over the chest with shoulder straps. It would sometimes have a problem with static interference, even if the wearer laughed or smiled.

The development of transistors in 1948 by Bell Laboratories led to major improvements to the hearing aid. The transistor was invented by John Bardeen, Walter Brattain, and William Shockley. Transistors were created to replace vacuum tubes; they were small, required less battery power and had less distortion and heat than their predecessor. These vacuum tubes were typically hot and fragile, so the transistor was the ideal replacement. The 1952 Sonotone 1010 used a transistor stage along with vacuum tubes, to extend battery life. The size of these transistors led to developments in miniature, carbon microphones. These microphones could be mounted on various items, even eyeglasses. In 1951, Raytheon manufactured the transistor and was one of the first companies to mass-produce transistors throughout America. Raytheon realized that their hearing aid only lasted short-term and began to sell the vacuum-tube hearing aids again along with transistor hearing aids.

The act of putting transistors into hearing aids happened so quickly that the new hearing aids were not properly tested before release. It was later found that transistors could get damp. Because of this dampness, the hearing aid would only last for a few weeks and then die. In order to stop this from happening, a coating had to be put on the transistor to protect it from dampness. This problem had to be fixed in order for transistors in hearing aids to be successful.

Zenith was the first company to realize the problem with transistors was the body heat of individuals. After coming to this conclusion, the first "all-transistor" hearing aids were offered in 1952, called the Microtone Transimatic and the Maico Transist-ear. In 1954, the company, Texas Instruments, produced a silicon transistor, which was much more effective than the previous version. The end of the transistor hearing aid was marked by the creation of the integrated circuit or IC by Jack Kilby at Texas Instruments in 1958 and the technique was perfected in hearing aids over the next 20 years.

== Digital hearing aid ==
Beginning in the early 1960s, Bell Telephone Laboratories created digital processing for creating both speech and audio signals on a large mainframe computer. Because of the slow processing ability of these large digital computers of the era, the process of simulating hearing aids was extremely slow. The processing of the audio speech signal took longer than the length of the duration of the speech signal itself preventing the processing of speech in real time. This made it nearly impossible to conceive the idea that a self-contained, wearable digital hearing aid could be made small enough to fit onto an ear like a conventional analog hearing aid. However, this digital processing research was important for learning about how to develop sounds for those with hearing disabilities.

In the 1970s, the microprocessor was created. This microprocessor helped to open up the door to miniaturization of the digital hearing aid. Moreover, researcher Edgar Villchur developed an analog multi-channel amplitude compression device that enabled an audio signal to be separated into frequency bands. These frequency bands were able to adjust the analog sound non-linearly so that weaker sounds could be amplified more while louder sounds were amplified less. The system of multi-channel amplitude compression would be later used as the fundamental structural design for the first hearing aids that used digital technology.

Also in the 1970s came the creation of the hybrid hearing aid in which the analog components of a conventional hearing aid consisting of amplifiers, filters and signal limiting were combined with a separate digital programmable component into a conventional hearing aid case. The audio processing remained analog but was able to be controlled by the digital programmable component. The digital component could be programmed by connecting the device to an external computer in the laboratory then disconnected to allow the hybrid device to function as a conventional wearable hearing aid.

The hybrid device was effective from a practical point of view because of the low power consumption and compact size. At that time, low-power analog amplifier technology was more developed in comparison to the available semiconductor chips able to process audio in real time. The combination of high performance analog components for real time audio processing and a separate low power digital programmable component only for controlling the analog signal led to the creation several low power digital programmable components able to implement different types of digital control of analog circuits.

A hybrid hearing aid was developed by Etymotic Design. A little later, Stephan Mangold and Arne Leijon created a programmable multi-channel hybrid hearing aid. Graupe with co-authors developed a digital programmable component that implemented an adaptive noise filter that could be added to a hybrid hearing aid, referred to as the Zeta Noise Blocker, routinely adjusted the gain in the frequency channels to help control high levels of noise. The chip was integrated in a number of hearing aids in the 1980s.

The creation of high-speed digital-array processors used in minicomputers opened up the door for advances in full digital hearing aids. These minicomputers were able to process audio signals at speeds that were equivalent to real-time. In 1982, at the City University of New York, a real-time full digital experimental hearing aid was created based on the digital array processor in an external, standalone minicomputer and an FM radio transmitter that allowed a wireless connection between the minicomputer and individual wearing a transmitter on the body. The FM transmitter on the body was connected by a wire to an ear microphone and loudspeaker. Technically, this was a wearable hearing aid. However, it was not a self contained unit, the range of use was limited by the range of the wireless connection, and the external minicomputer was extremely heavy and nearly impossible to move ― all of which prevented it from being used as conventional hearing aid in real world environments. However, this was a major breakthrough in the creation of a full digital hearing aid.

Also in the early 1980s a research group at Central Institute for the Deaf headed up by faculty members at Washington University in St. Louis created the first full digital wearable hearing aid. They were the first to design and manufacture a full miniaturized digital hearing aid to be powered by battery and be fully wearable. This method used custom digital processing chips with low power and very large scale integrated (VLSI) chip technology which allowed for processing both audio and the necessary control signals in real time. These advances resulted in a hearing aid which was able to be used by individuals with hearing loss in any environment — rather than only specifically controlled spaces.

Engebretson, Morley and Popelka were the inventors of the first full digital hearing aid — which they patented in 1984. Their implementation also included many additional features now used in all contemporary full digital hearing aids, including: a bidirectional interface with an external computer; self-calibration; self-adjustment; wide bandwidth; digital programmability; a fitting algorithm based on audibility; internal storage of digital programs; and fully digital multichannel amplitude compression and output limiting. This group created several of these full digital hearing aids and used them for research on hearing impaired people who wore them in the same manner as conventional hearing aids in real-world situations. In their first full DHA, all stages of sound processing and control were carried out in binary form. The external sound from microphones positioned in an ear module identical to a BTE was first converted into binary code, digitally processed and digitally controlled in real time, then converted back to an analog signal sent to miniature loudspeakers positioned in an ITE ear module.

Over the years, specialized hearing aid chips continued to become smaller, increased in computational ability and required even less power. Now, virtually all commercial hearing aids are fully digital and their digital signal processing capability has significantly increased. Very small and very low power specialized digital hearing aid chips are now used in all hearing aids manufactured worldwide. Many additional new features also have been added with various on-board advanced wireless technology.

Commercial digital chips that were devoted to high-speed digital signal processing or DSP became available in 1982. The first commercial full digital hearing aid using a commercial DSP chip was created in 1987 by the Nicolet Corporation. The hearing aid contained a body-worn processor that had a hardwire connection with an ear mounted transducer. While the Nicolet Corporation's hearing aid was not publicly successful and the company shortly folded, it was able to start a competition among hearing aid manufacturers to create more effective full digital hearing aids. Two years later, in 1989, the commercial behind-the-ear (BTE) full digital hearing aid was launched. One of the major contributions of these chips was the ability to process both speech and other types of noises in real time. One major down fall of these chips was that they were massive and used up a lot of battery charge, which made them nearly impossible to be worn.

In addition to the Nicolet Corporation, Bell Laboratories expanded upon the hearing aid business by developing a hybrid digital-analog hearing aid. This hearing aid used digital circuits to handle a two-channel compression amplifier. Even though early research on this hearing aid was successful, AT&T, the parent company to Bell Laboratories, pulled out of the hearing aid market and sold its rights to Resound Corporation in 1987. When the hybrid hearing aid was put on in the market, it helped bring major changes to the world of the hybrid hearing aid.

After the success of the Resound Corporation, other hearing aid manufacturers began putting out hybrid hearing aids that included analog amplifiers, filters, and limiters that were managed digitally. There were many benefits to these hearing aids that included storing parameter settings, having a capability for paired-comparison testing, having settings for different acoustic environments, and having more advanced methods of signal processing that included multi-channel compression.

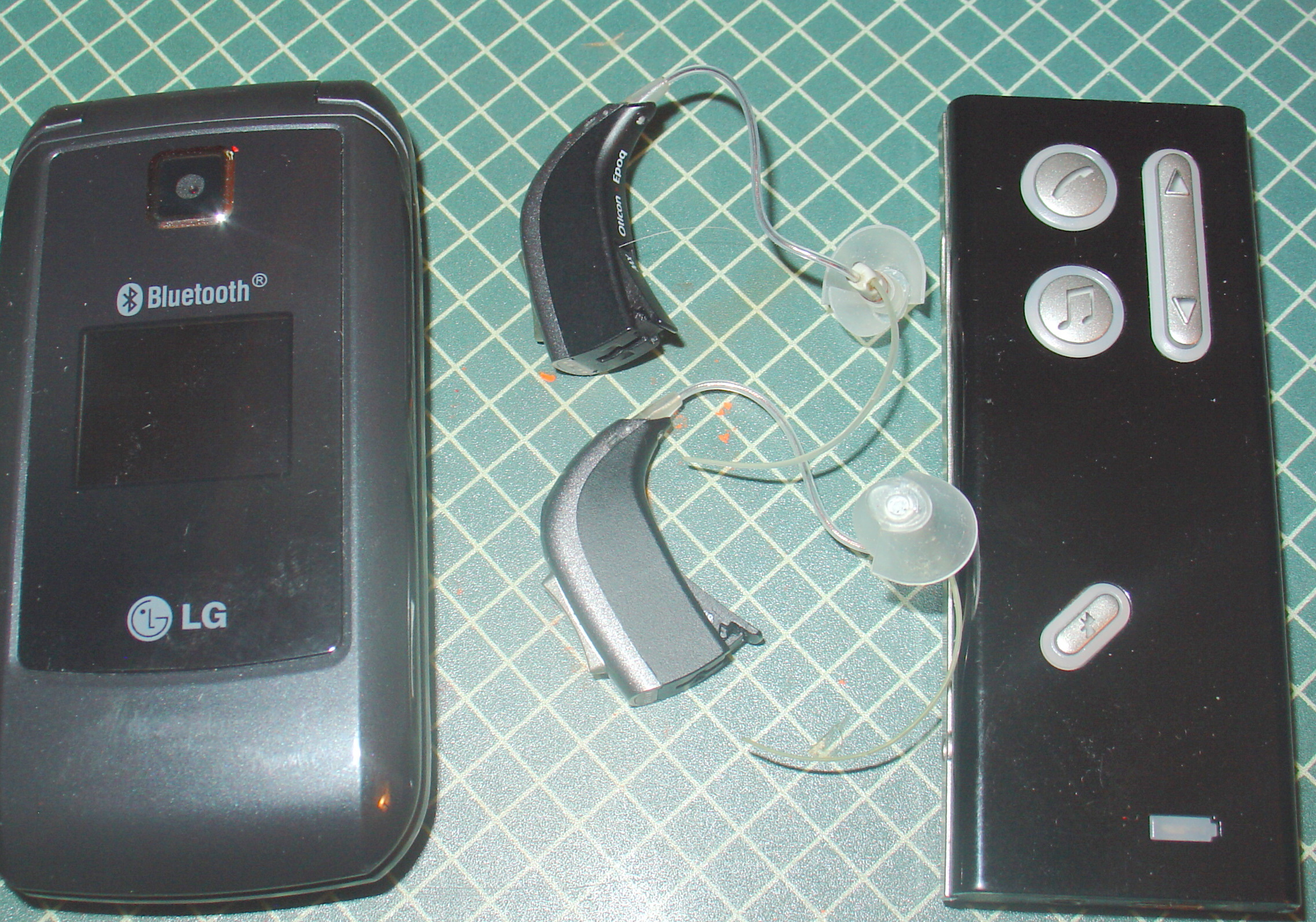
Oticon hearing aids to be used with Bluetooth wireless devices.

The next major milestone was creating a commercial full digital hearing aid. The Oticon Company developed the first commercial full digital hearing aid in 1995, but it was only distributed to audiological research centers for research on digital technology in the realm of acoustic amplification. The Senso was the first commercially successful, full digital hearing aid, and was created by Widex in 1996. After the success of the Senso, Oticon began marketing their own hearing aid, the DigiFocus.

Current digital hearing aids are now programmable which enables them to regulate sound on their own — without using a separate control. They can now adjust themselves depending on what environment they are in and often no longer require a physical volume control button.

Recently, "Made for iPhone hearing aids" (MFi) were introduced by Resound, which enables users of MFi digital hearing aids to stream phone calls, music, and podcasts directly from iOS devices.

Directly leveraging the audio processing power potential in smartphones, Jacoti BVBA from Belgium developed ListenApp, the first digital hearing aid application to win CE certification and FDA approval as a medical device.

== See also ==
- Spatial hearing loss
