= Crème caramel =

Custard dessert with soft caramel on top

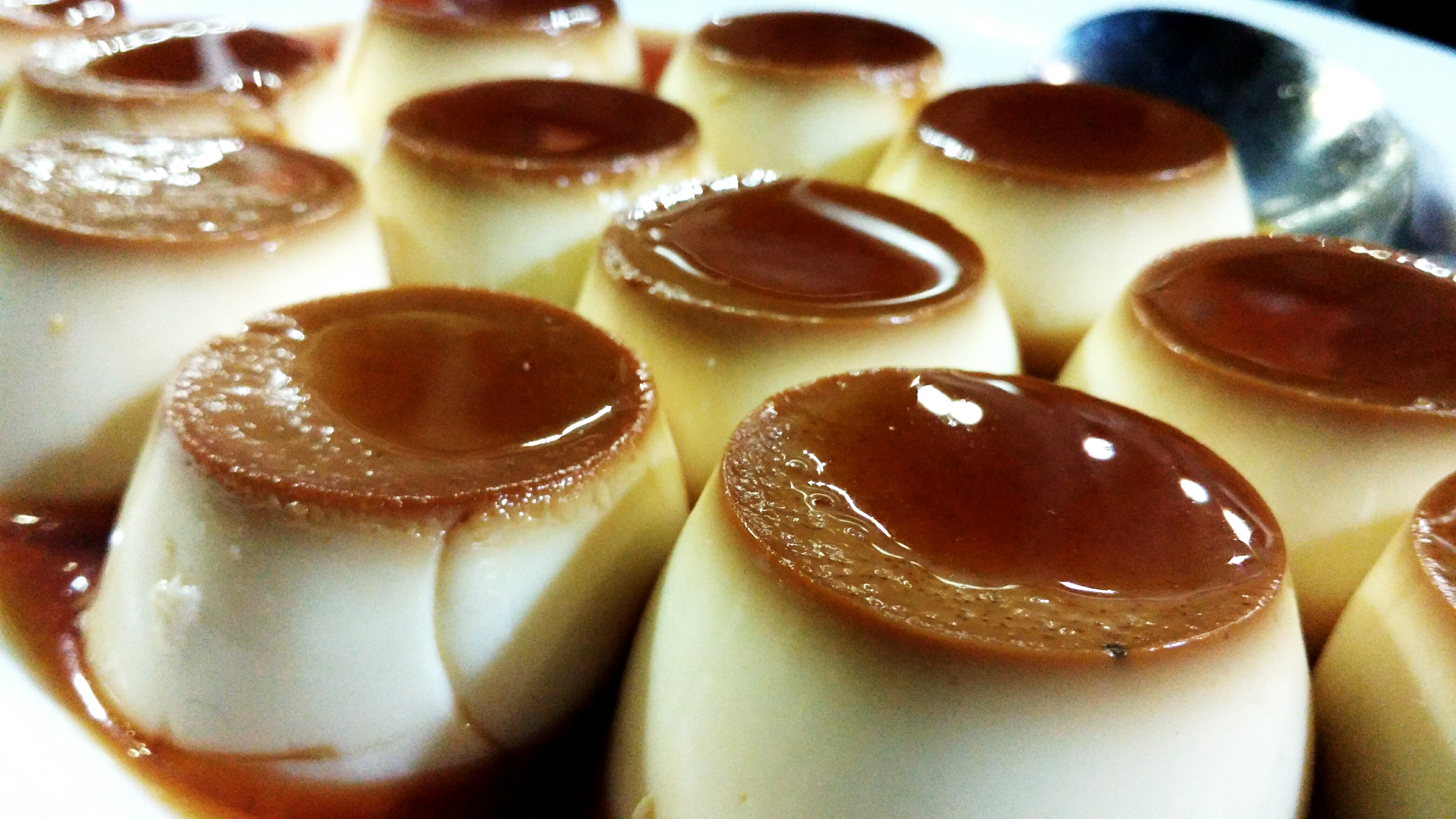
- Rows of crèmes caramel
- Alternative names: Caramel custard
- Course: Dessert
- Place of origin: France
- Serving temperature: Cold or warm
- Main ingredients: Eggs, milk, sugar
- Variations: Crème brûlée, crema catalana

Crème caramel (French: [kʁɛm kaʁamɛl], lit. 'Caramel Cream'), crème renversée, caramel pudding, condensed milk pudding, or caramel jelly is a custard-based caramel-flavoured dessert. Some popular variants of this dish are called flan in Spanish-speaking countries, in the US, and in parts of southeast Asia.

== History ==
Custard has a long documented history, but crème caramel or flan in its modern form, with soft caramel on top, and prepared and cooked using a bain-marie, is first documented in La cuisinière provençale by Jean Baptiste Reboul published in 1897.

In the late 20th century, crème caramel was common in European restaurants. The food historian Alan Davidson speculates that this may have been because the dish could be prepared in bulk, in advance.

== Etymology ==
In this context, crème in French means 'custard'. The names crème (caramel) renversée (French) and crema volteada (Spanish) allude to the custard being turned over to be served.

Both crème caramel ('caramel cream') and flan are French names; however, flan has come to have different meanings in different regions.

In Spanish-speaking countries (and often in the United States), crème caramel is known as flan. This was originally a Spanish-language usage. However, in North America the word is now best known in Latin American contexts; the other meaning is less common. Elsewhere, including in Britain, the English word flan means a type of tart somewhat like a quiche.

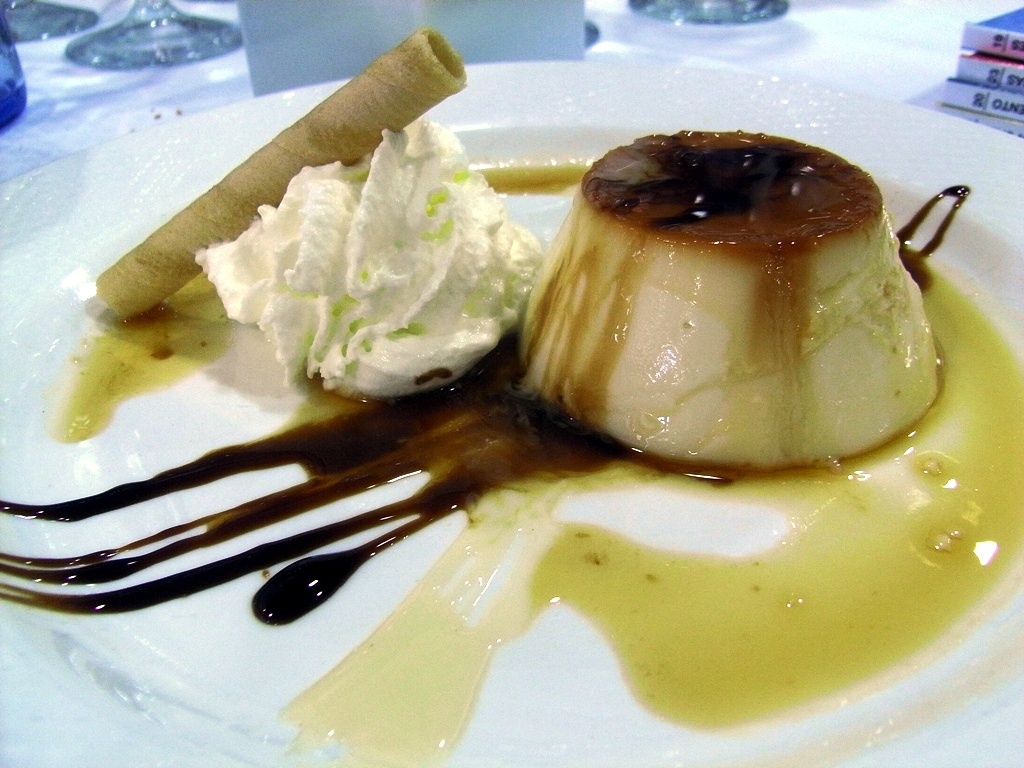
Restaurant-prepared order of crème caramel, with sauce and garnish

== Preparation ==
Crème caramel is a variant of plain custard (crème) where sugar syrup cooked to caramel stage is poured into the mold before adding the custard base. It is usually cooked in a bain-marie on a stovetop or in the oven in a water bath. It is turned and served with the caramel sauce on top, hence the alternate French names crème (caramel) renversée or 'crème renversée au caramel. The milk may be flavored with vanilla, cinnamon, or lemon peel. The resulting texture is gelatinous and creamy.

Turning out larger dishes requires care, as the custard easily splits. Larger dishes also require more care to avoid undercooking the interior or overcooking the exterior. Thus, crème caramel is often cooked and served in individual ramekins. The objective is to obtain a homogeneous and smooth cream on the surface of the crème caramel with a liquid caramel base. Cooking it in a bain-marie avoids burning the caramel.

=== Imitations ===
An imitation of crème caramel may be prepared from "instant flan powder", which is thickened with agar or carrageenan rather than eggs. In some Latin American countries, the true custard version is known as 'milk flan' (flan de leche) or even 'milk cheese', and the substitute version is known as simply flan.

== Regional varieties ==
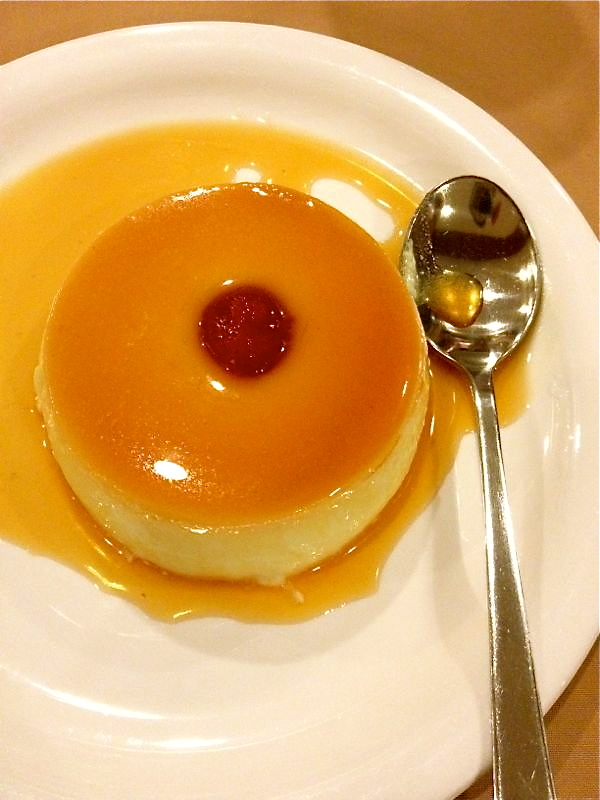
Caramel custard served at a restaurant in Mangalore, India

=== Argentina and Uruguay ===
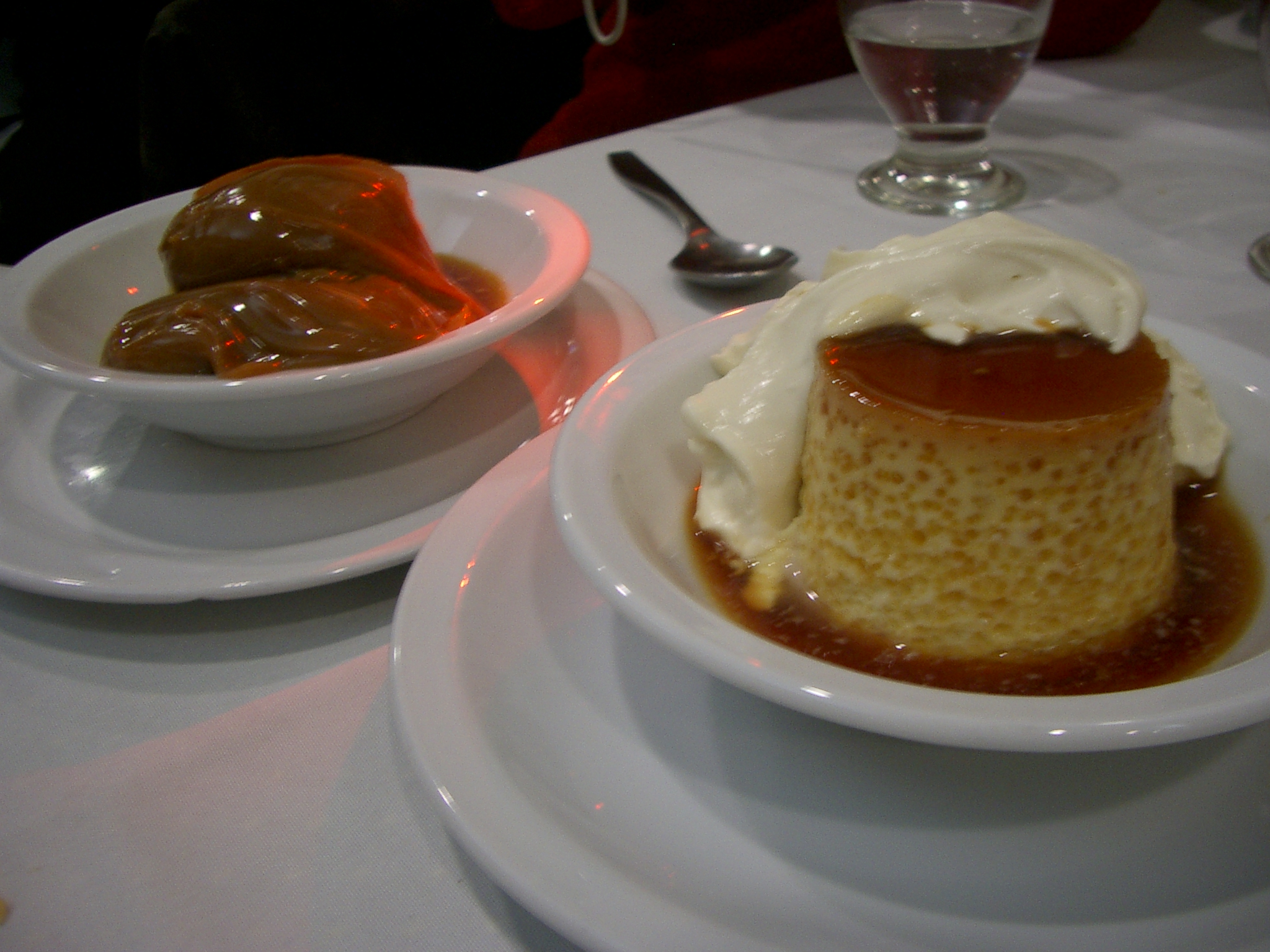
Argentine flan and dulce de leche

In Argentina and Uruguay, crème caramel is usually eaten with dulce de leche, whipped cream, or both (flan mixto).

=== Bangladesh ===
In Bangladesh, it is a common dessert and is known as ডিমের পুডিং (egg pudding) or simply পুডিং (pudding). It is a lasting remnant of Portuguese settlement in Chittagong from where it spread through the rest of the country.

=== Brazil and Venezuela ===
In Venezuela and Brazil, it is often made with condensed milk, milk, eggs, and caramelized sugar on top. The Venezuelan version is known as quesillo ("small cheese") and in Brazil, a local version is known as pudim, specifically pudim de leite ("milk pudding"), though the traditional flan is also commercially available. Pudim can have variations of flavor, such as chocolate, coconut, paçoca (peanut candy), cheese, and others, condensed milk pudding being a base recipe.

=== Cambodia, Laos, and Thailand ===
In Cambodia, Laos, and Thailand, crème caramel often made with condensed milk, milk, coconut milk (as alternative), coconut cream, eggs and caramelized sugar on top.

=== Caribbean ===
In many Caribbean countries, the inclusion of coconut, condensed milk and evaporated milk is widespread. The milk base may also be flavored with nuts and fruits.

=== Chile ===
A slice of a large crème caramel topped with rich golden caramel sauce and whipped cream.

In Chile, leche asada or 'roasted milk' is similar to crème caramel because it is made with the same ingredients, but leche asada has a less smooth texture and is baked directly, which creates a toasted layer on the surface. In Chile, it is often eaten with dulce de membrillo (quince jelly) or condensed milk.

=== Costa Rica ===
Flan in Costa Rica often features coconut or coffee (flan de café).

=== Croatia ===
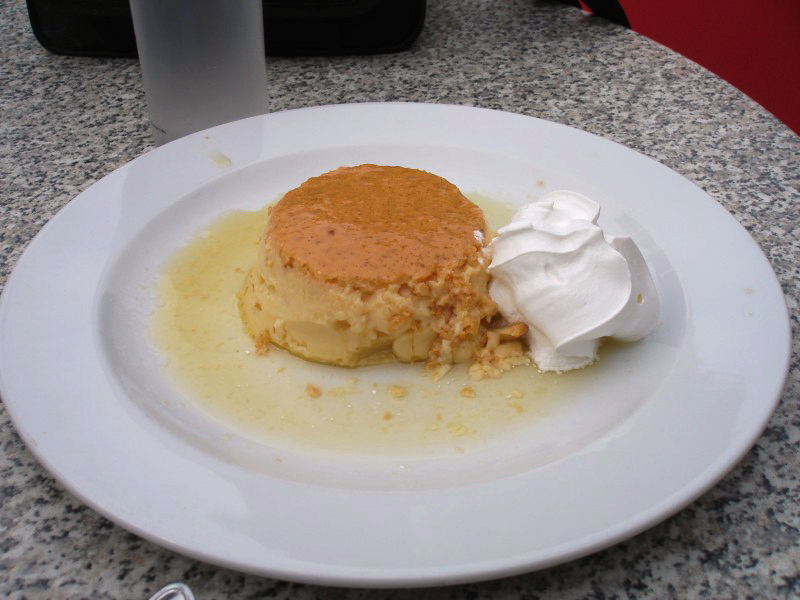
Croatian rožata

In Croatia, rožata, rozata, rožada or rozada (pronounced [rǒʒaːta]) is flavored with the Dubrovnik liqueur rozalin (rose liqueur), which gives the cake its characteristic aroma. It has a documented history stretching from medieval times. Modern variations include vanilla and other flavorings.

=== Cuba ===
Cuban flan (flan de Cuba) is made with the addition of egg whites and a cinnamon stick. A similar Cuban dish is Copa Lolita, a small caramel flan served with one or two scoops of vanilla ice cream. Other variations include coconut or rum raisin topping.

=== Dominican Republic ===
In the Dominican Republic, only egg yolks are used, mixed with vanilla, evaporated milk, and condensed milk. Coconut flan is known as quesillo.

=== France ===
Regional variations of crème caramel in France include:

- Crème Renversée à la Normande: This variation of crème caramel is specific to the Normandy region of France. It is made with the addition of Calvados, an apple brandy produced in Normandy, which gives the dessert a distinct apple flavor.
- Crème Caramel à la Bretonne: This variation hails from Brittany and is made with the addition of salted butter, which adds a savory element to the dessert. The salted butter caramelizes with the sugar to create a unique flavor profile.
- Crème Caramel à la Provençale: In the Provence region, crème caramel is often flavored with lavender or orange blossom water, giving it a floral and aromatic twist.
- Crème Caramel à la Parisienne: This variation is commonly found in Parisian restaurants and is typically made with whole milk and egg yolks for a rich and creamy texture. It is often served in individual portions or as a large version.

=== India ===
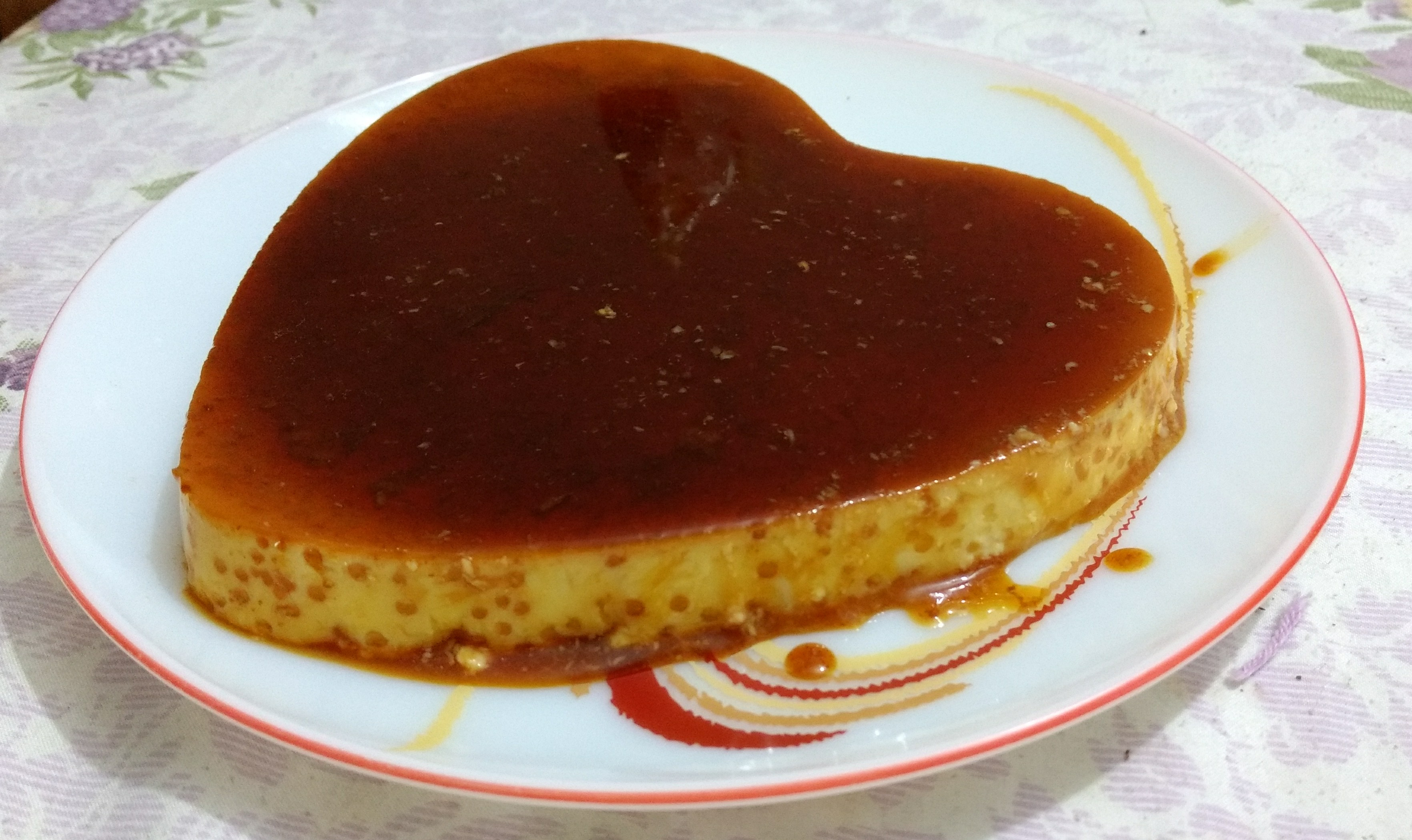
Homemade caramel pudding, Mumbai

Caramel custard is popular, especially in the larger coastal cities, and in former Portuguese colonies such as Goa, Daman and Diu. Sometimes, masala chai is added on the side. It is a staple on restaurant menus in the beach resorts along India's coasts and also prepared regularly in the home kitchens of the Anglo-Indian Goan, Malayali, Mangalorean and Parsi communities.

=== Japan ===
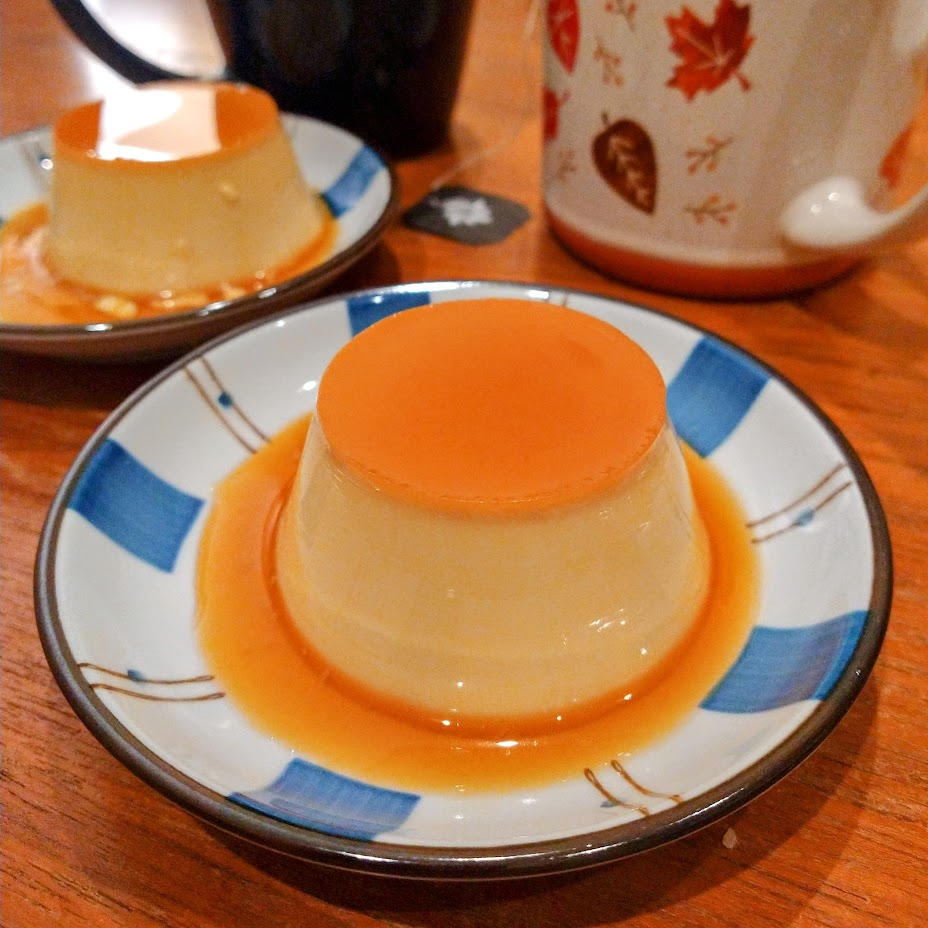
Japanese purin

Japanese crème caramel, or purin (プリン) (i.e., "pudding"), or caramel custard pudding, is known for its silky smooth texture and creamy yet light taste.

Purin is popularly sold as a packaged dessert in Japanese convenience stores and grocery stores worldwide, including Japan, the United States, and Taiwan.

=== Malaysia ===
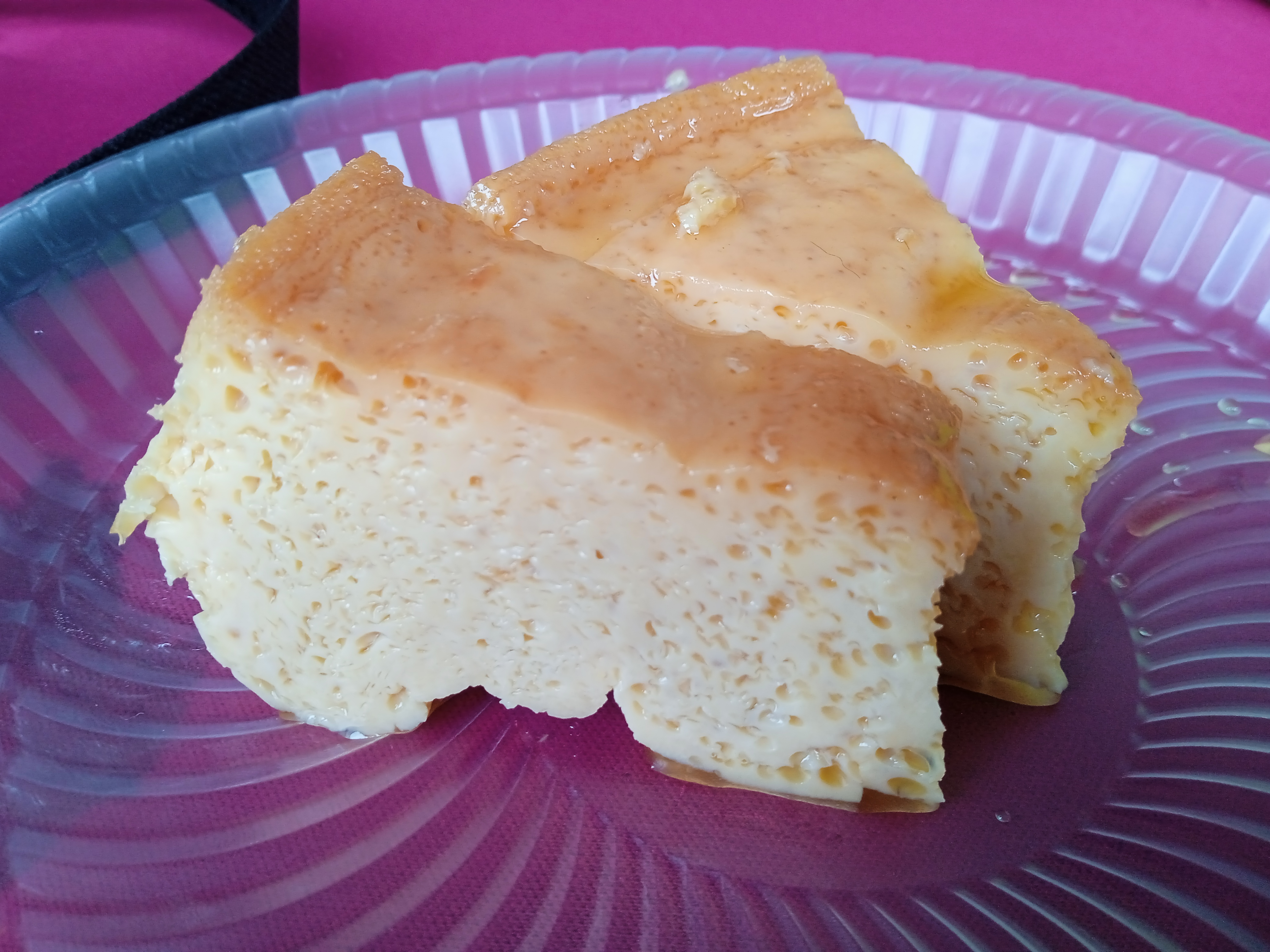
A slice of puding karamel

Caramel custard (locally known as puding karamel or puding karamel kastard) is a popular dessert in Malaysia. First introduced by the Portuguese in the 16th century and sold year-round today, this dessert is commonly served in restaurants, cafes, hotels, and even Ramadan bazaars for breaking the fast.

=== Mexico ===
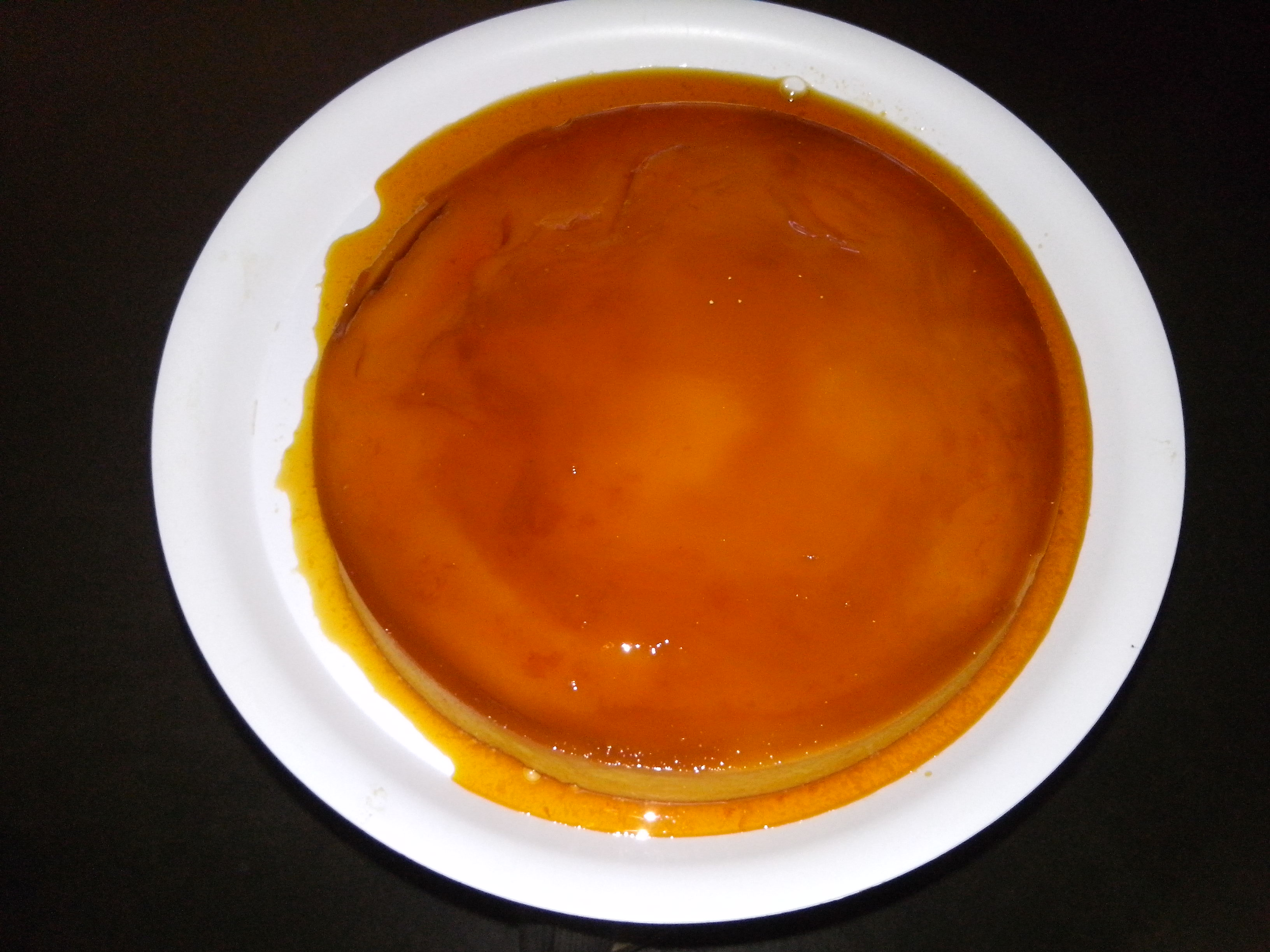
Flan napolitano in Mexico

Crème caramel is extremely popular in Mexico, being made at home, found pre-made at grocery stores, served in restaurants, and even sold on the streets. A variation of the dish called Flan Napolitano is made in some parts of Mexico where cream cheese is added to create a creamier consistency, though it is not as popular or widespread. Flan's popularity among Mexican-Americans helped the dish become popular in the United States. Another variation is "Flan de Cajeta", which replaces the standard caramel with cajeta (milk caramel with a base of goat milk). A popular Mexican dessert involving crème caramel is "chocoflan" (a portmanteau of its constituents), which is a layered Bundt cake-styled dessert made of chocolate cake and Crème caramel baked in a water bath. It also has the nickname "impossible cake" due to how it is prepared: despite the Crème caramel layer making up the top half in the final dessert, the chocolate cake batter is poured in the tin first. Its popularity has spread to other Latin American countries, such as Chile.

=== Peru ===
In Peru, crema volteada 'flipped cream' may use condensed rather than regular milk. Fruit may also be added, such as lúcuma, custard apple, soursop, or granadilla.

=== Philippines ===
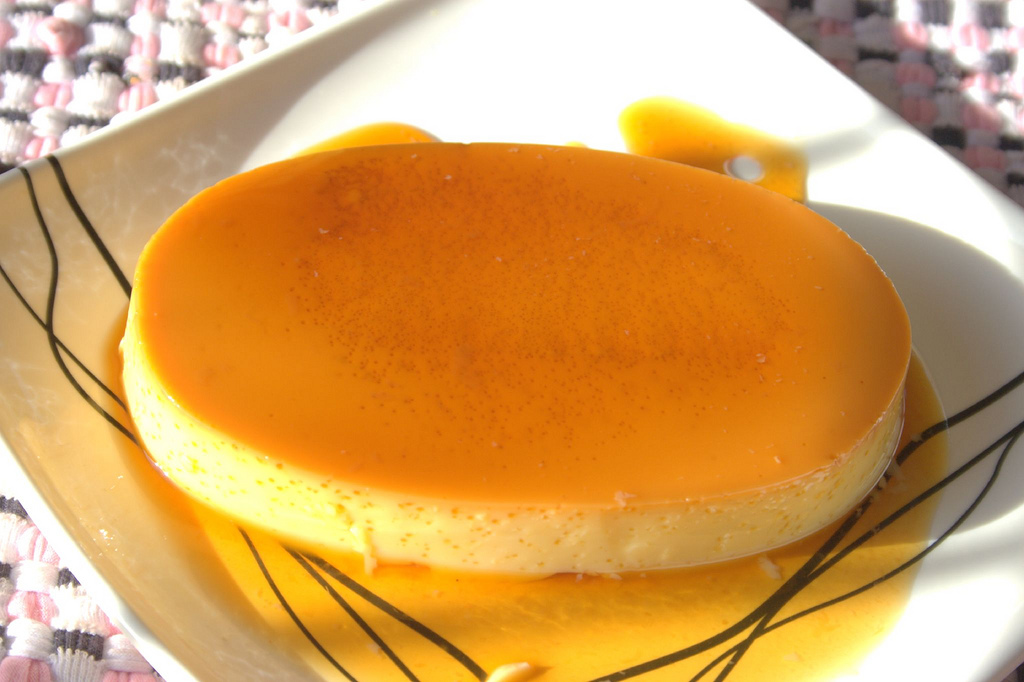
Philippine leche flan are characteristically oval-shaped due to the traditional use of tin molds known as llaneras.

In the Philippines, crème caramel is known as leche flan (an anglicization of Spanish flan de leche, literally "milk flan"), which is a denser and sweeter version of the Spanish dish, made with condensed milk and just egg yolks. It originated from the utilization of leftover egg yolks after the egg whites were used in making mortar (palitada) for buildings in the 16th century Spanish Philippines. Leche flan is a staple dessert in celebratory feasts in Philippine culture.

Leche flan is usually steamed over an open flame or stove top in an oval-shaped tin mold known as llanera (also spelled lyanera, which is also used to make hardinera), although rarely it can also be cooked in an oven.

Leche flan is also commonly baked into pastries. The most common is the Filipino dessert flan cake or leche flan cake, a Filipino chiffon or sponge cake base (mamón) with a layer of leche flan on top. It can similarly be baked into steamed cupcakes known as puto mamón, a combination known as puto flan. It is also a key component of the halo-halo shaved ice dessert.

=== Portugal ===
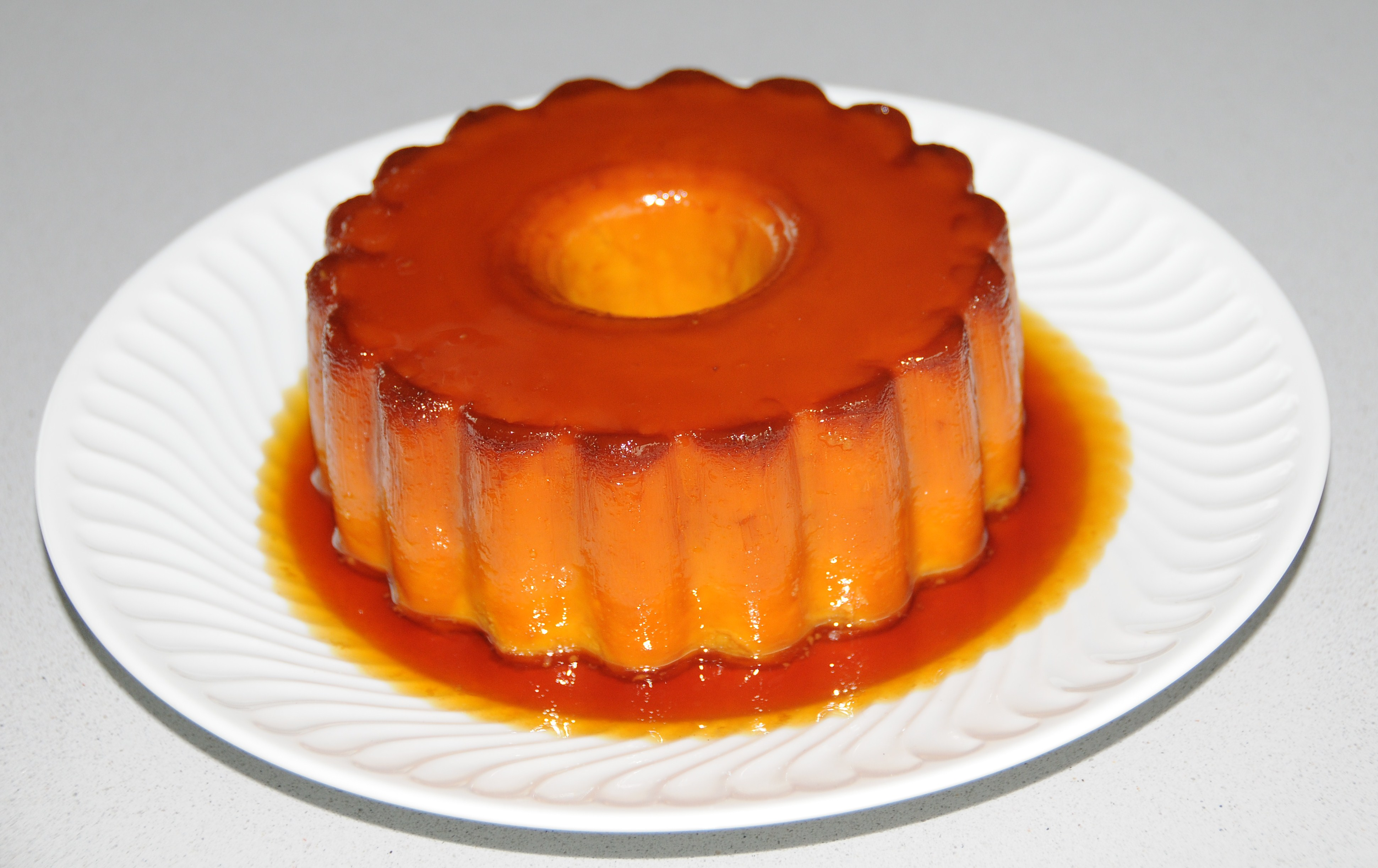
Portuguese Pudim Abade de Priscos

Known as Pudim flan, it is made with milk, eggs, caramelized sugar, and vanilla. Variations include orange or lemon zest, cinnamon, pineapple, Port wine, or even bacon, as is the case with Pudim Abade de Priscos. It characteristically has a hole in the center.

=== Puerto Rico ===
Most Puerto Rican flans are based on eggs and milk. Egg white and egg yolks are beaten separately with sugar to achieve a light flan. The Puerto Rican dessert flancocho combines flan de queso (cream cheese flan) with a cake base (bizcocho).

=== Spain ===
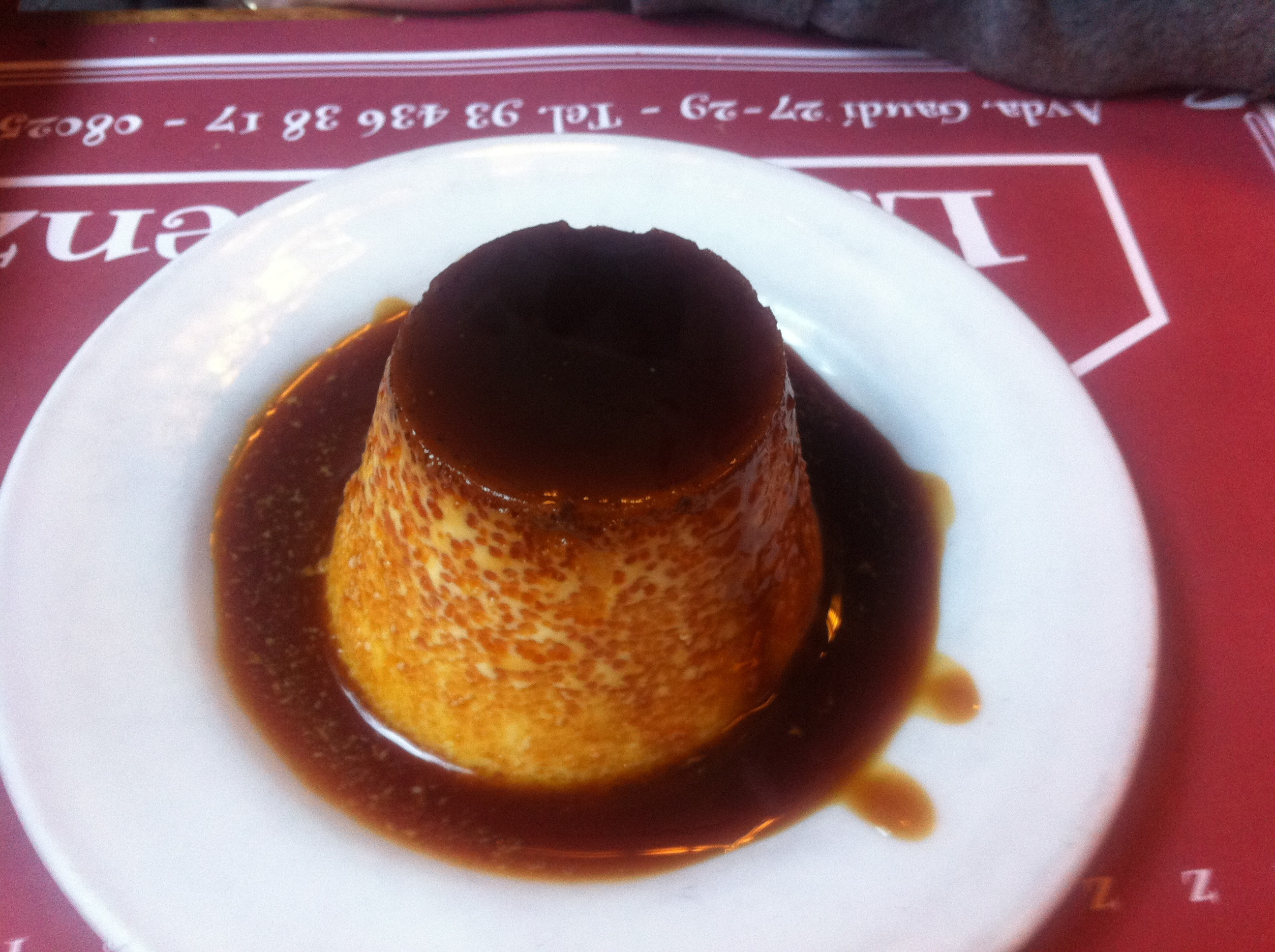
Spanish flan.

In Spain, flan is a typical dessert that is often homemade and is also sold in grocery stores and restaurants with many variations. The best known version is the typical flan de huevo (egg flan), but there are many other versions, such as flan de queso, flan de leche, flan de vainilla, etc. In the original version, the flan has a layer of caramelised sugar that is sometimes crystallised to make it hard.

=== Vietnam ===
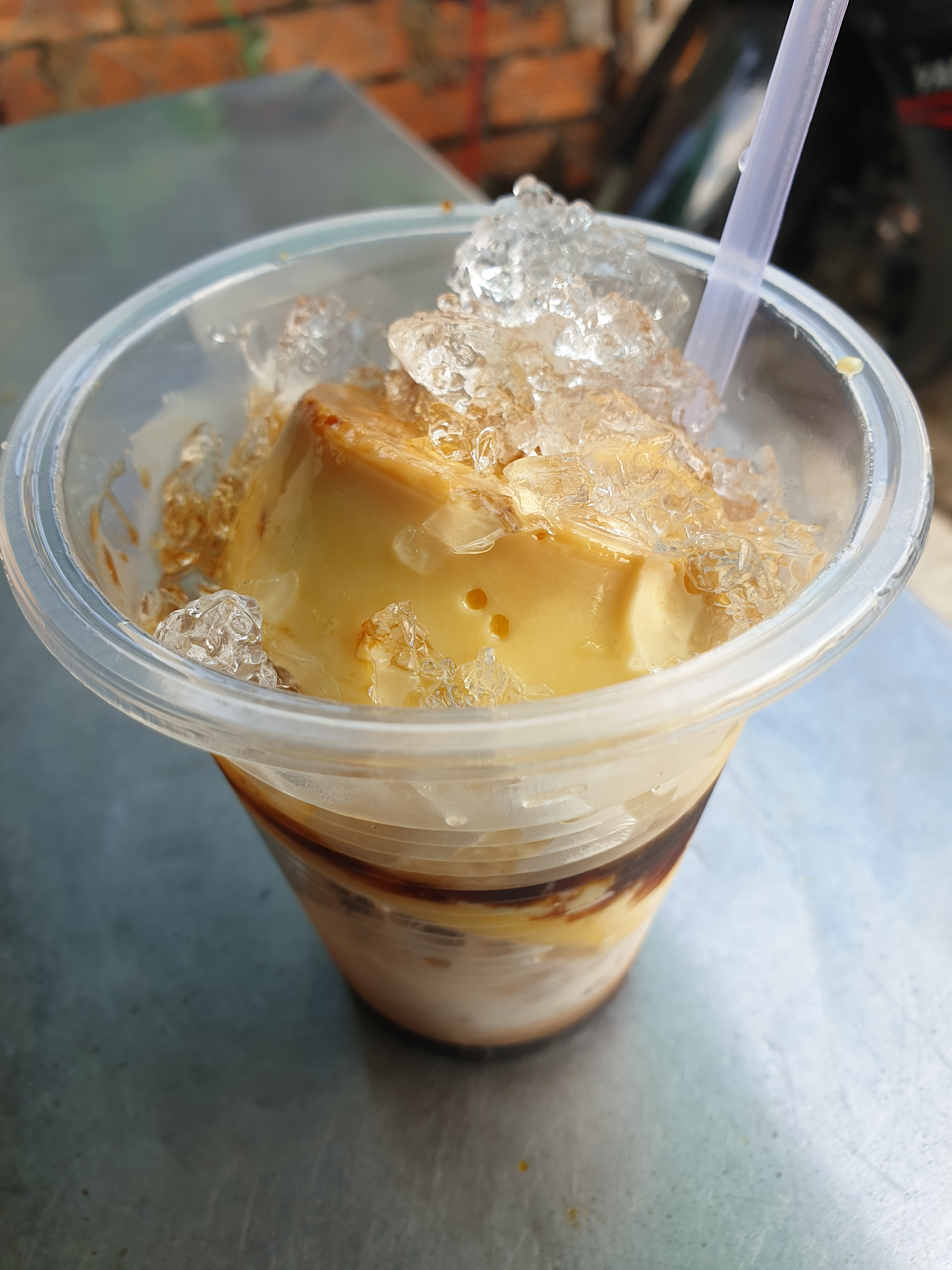
A cup of bánh flan

Crème caramel was introduced by the French and is common in Vietnam. It is known as caramen, or kem caramel in northern Vietnam or bánh flan or kem flan in southern Vietnam. Variations include serving with black coffee poured on top, or browning the caramel past typical caramelization point to make a darker, more bitter "burnt caramel".

== See also ==
- Crème brûlée, custard with a hard caramelised sugar topping
- Pudim Abade de Priscos, a rich Portuguese version
- Bonet, a Piedmontese variant made with cocoa and amaretto
- Tocino de cielo, a version without milk
- Flan cake, a similar dish originating from the Philippines
