= Leche asada =

Flan-like dessert from South America

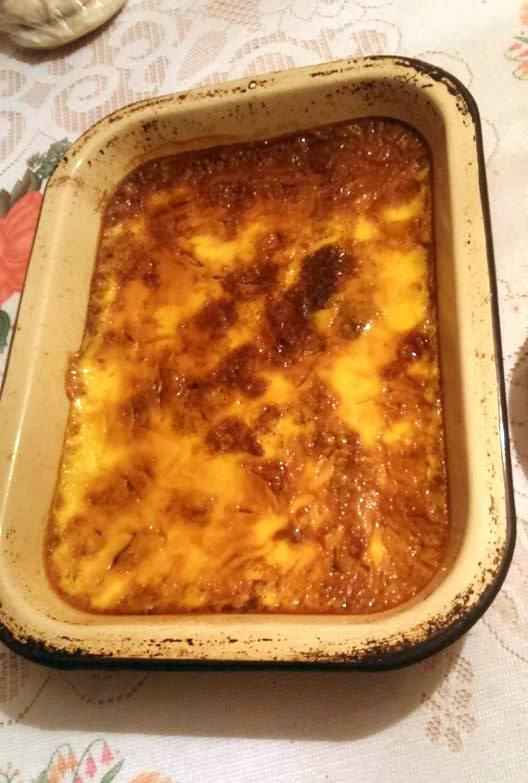
- Peruana leche asada, just cooked
- Alternative names: Quesillo (Venezuela)
- Type: Dessert
- Region or state: Peru, Argentina Colombia, Chile
- Associated cuisine: Peruvian, Colombian, Chilean, Venezuelan, Argentinian
- Serving temperature: Room temperature or cold
- Main ingredients: Milk, Eggs, Sugar, and Vanilla Extract.

Leche asada (literally "roasted milk") is a dessert from Peru, Argentina, Colombia, and Chile. It is similar to flan because it is made with the same ingredients, but 'leche asada' has a less smooth texture and is baked directly, which creates a toasted layer on the surface.
