= Sonotone 1010 =

Hearing aid

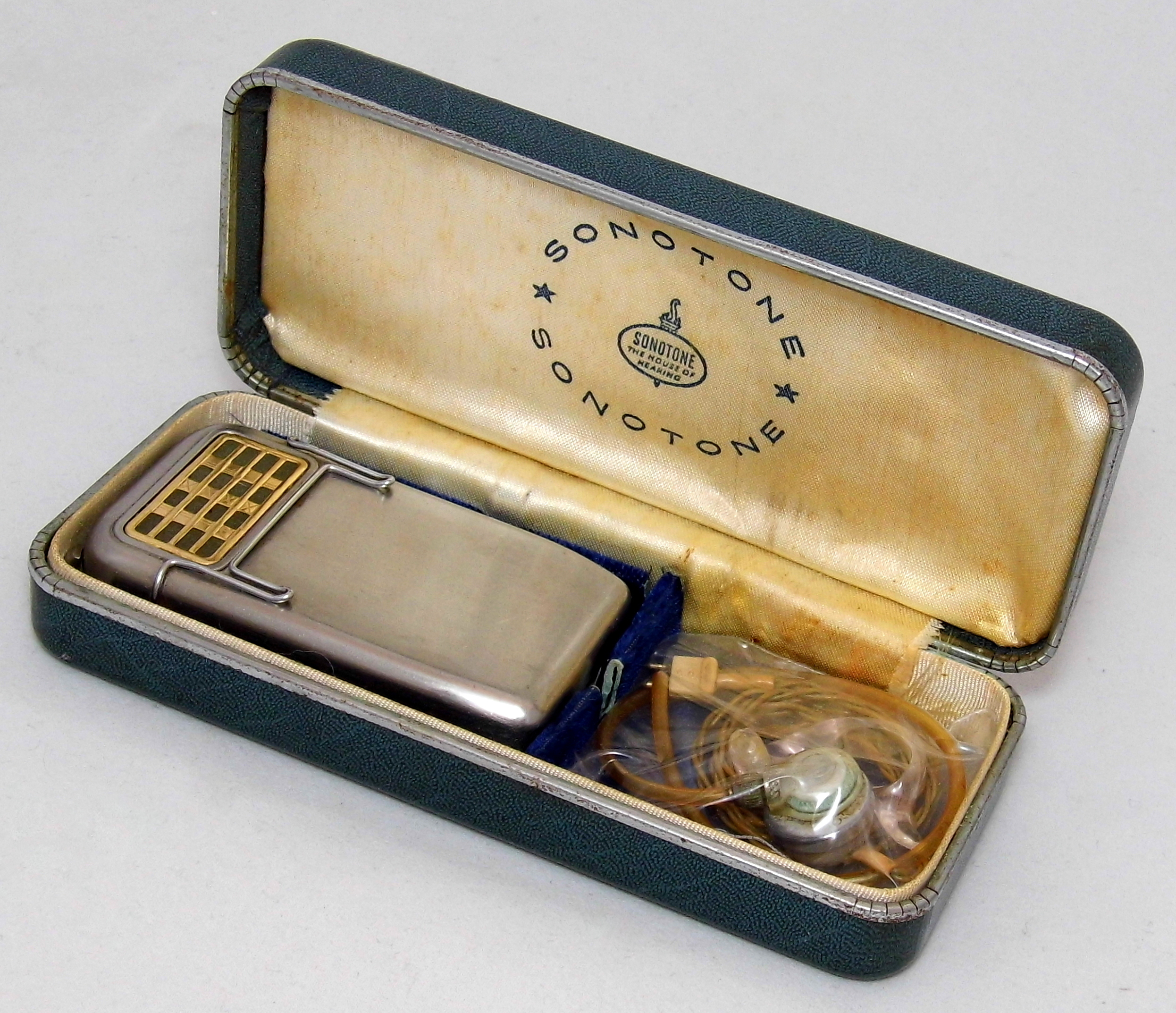
Sonotone 1010 in case, with headphones

The Sonotone 1010 hearing aid was introduced on 29 December 1952. It was the first commercial product to use transistors, which had been invented five years earlier in 1947.

It was a hybrid design, using two miniature vacuum tubes as input stages and a single transistor as the output stage; this was required because the transistors at the time produced too much electrical noise. Even using one transistor considerably extended battery life, lowering the operating cost of the unit. As transistors improved, this model was replaced by all-transistor hearing aids.

The Sonotone company had its headquarters in New York City and was established in 1929. The company was bought by various other companies and was no longer in business by 2005.

== See also ==
- Deafness
- History of hearing aids
