= Sonotone (hearing aid) =

Hearing aid manufacturer

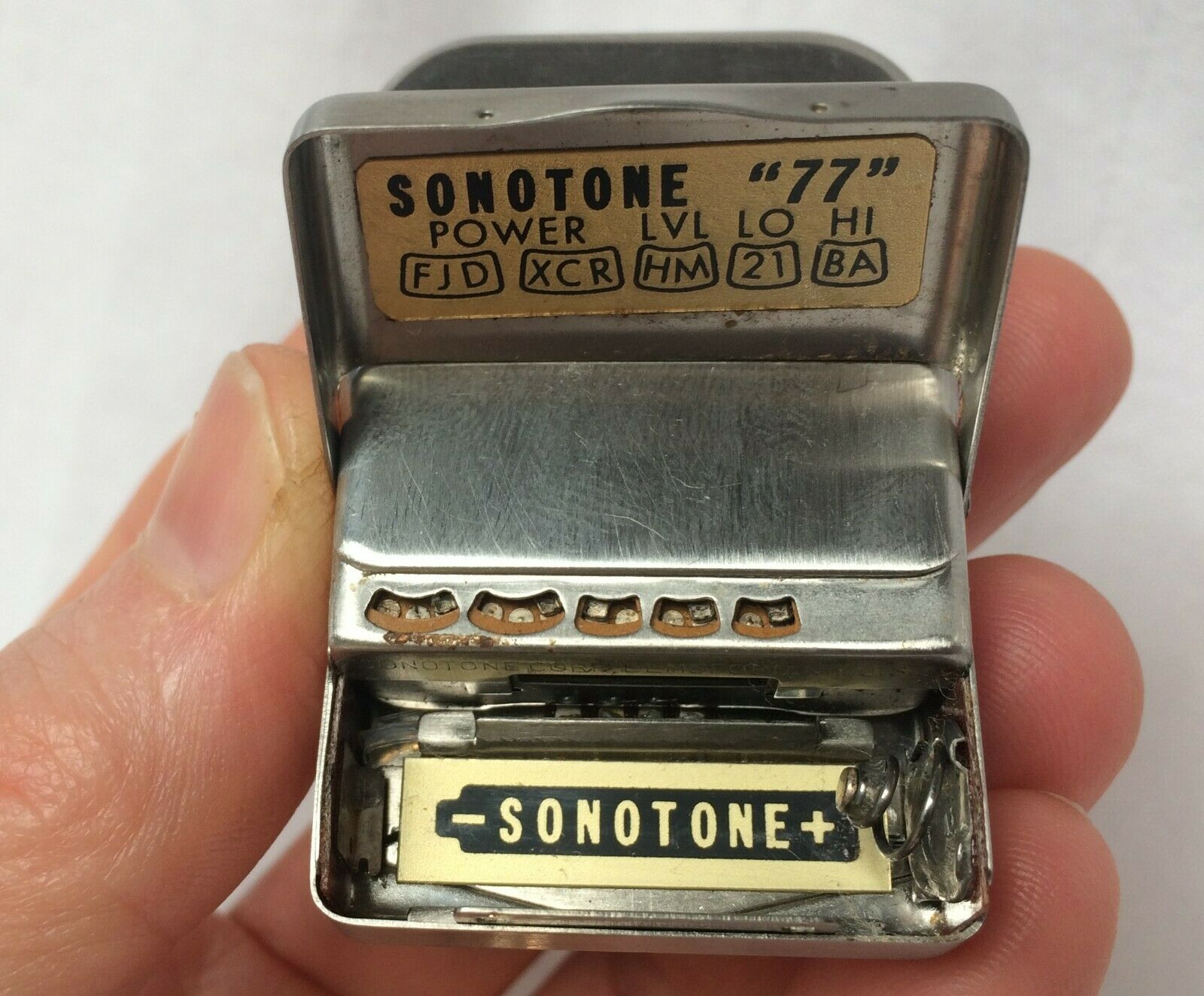
Battery compartment of a Sonotone 77 hearing aid.

Sonotone Corporation was a hearing aid manufacturer that was started by Hugo Leiber, inventor of the bone conduction receiver, in New York City in 1929.

== Overview ==
The company was a leader in the hearing aid industry until multiple buyouts ending in 1970 led to the abandonment of the manufacturing plant. It was temporarily revived in 1987, but had closed again by 2005.

Notable models of Sonotone hearing aids include the Sonotone 1010 in 1952 with a transistor and two vacuum tubes. By 1960, in addition to hearing aids, Sonotone manufactured nickel cadmium batteries, loudspeakers, and hand held microphones.
