= Louise Elisabeth de Meuron =

Swiss aristocrat (1882–1980)

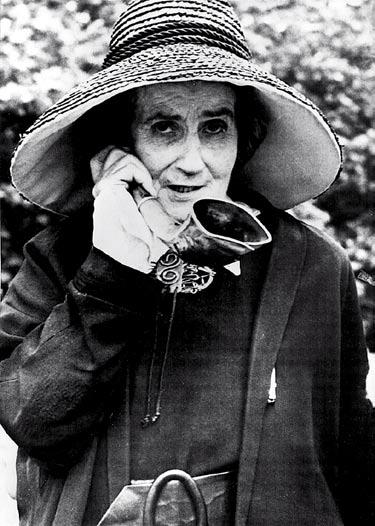
Meuron with her characteristic ear trumpet

Louise Elisabeth de Meuron (22 August 1882 – 22 May 1980), known as Madame de Meuron, was a well-known eccentric Swiss aristocrat from Bern. She owned several houses in the Bernese old town as well as the alpine meadowland known as Rämisgummen above Eggiwil. In addition, she inherited Amsoldingen Castle from her father and Rümligen Castle from her mother, the latter being her main residence for many years.

== Biography ==
She was born in Bern, daughter of Ludwig von Tscharner, a doctor of philosophy and army engineer, and Anna (née de Watteville), in the family's Münsterplatz residence. Her family refused to grant permission for her to marry the man she loved, and she was obliged to marry her cousin, banker Frédéric-Alphonse de Meuron, in 1905. The marriage ended in divorce in 1923. Her father died in 1927, her son committed suicide in 1939 and her daughter emigrated to Morocco.

The tragedy of her son's suicide caused her to dress in mourning for the rest of her life. She devoted herself to philosophy and wrote innumerable letters. She regularly staged equestrian jumping events (concours hippiques) and was noted for her imperious manner. Meuron's lifestyle gave rise to innumerable anecdotes which, while having substance, should not all be taken at face value.

Her reputation was derived not just from her anachronistic appearance—old fashioned widow's weeds, walking stick and ear trumpet ("So that I hear only what I want to hear"), but because of her eccentric behaviour. She was often seen in downtown Bern accompanied by her Russian greyhounds. Her staff were allowed to park her car anywhere; if police came she would exclaim, "That stays here!" She never bought a tram ticket, because, as she stated, "I was here before the tram!"

She would ask total strangers, "Are you someone or do you get a salary?" When a farmer wanted to sit on the Frisching family pew in church, she pulled him off, stating "Up in heaven we'll all be equal, but in the meantime, down here, we'll have a bit of discipline."

Once, when a female vagrant (crazy little beggar woman, as Meuron put it) was caught stealing fruit from her castle grounds, she locked her up in the coach house for two days. When charged with false imprisonment, she produced in court a document dating from the Middle Ages that authorized the owner of Rümligen Castle to administer low justice. She was let off with a small fine and a lecture on current law.

Meuron died on May 22, 1980 at the age of 97.

== Bibliography ==
- Borle, R. et al. (1980). Madame de Meuron 22. August 1882 – 22. Mai 1980. (in German) Bern: Erpf. ISBN 3-256-00019-3.
- Jenny, H. A. (1991). Schweizer Originale. (in German) Rorschach: Nebelspalter. pp. 76–79. ISBN 3-85819-158-2.
- Langhans-Maync, S. (1984). Madame de ... (in German) Ostermundigen: Viktoria. ISBN 385958-007-8.
- Meuron, G. (1991). Histoire d’une famille neuchâteloise. (in French) Hauterive: Attinger. ISBN 2-88256-050-8.
- Stettler, M. (1981). Machs na. Figuren und Exempel. (in German) Bern: Stämpfli. ISBN 3-7272-0049-9.
