= Pinard horn =

Stethoscope used to listen to the heart rate of a fetus

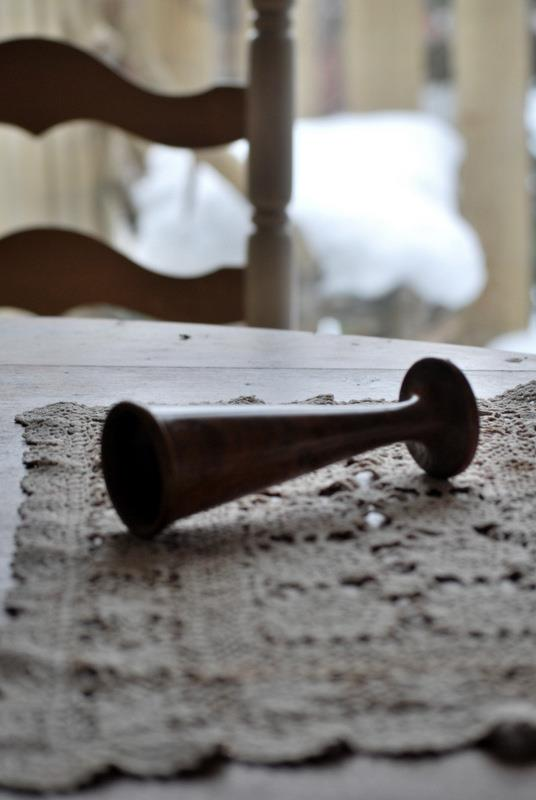
Wooden Pinard horn

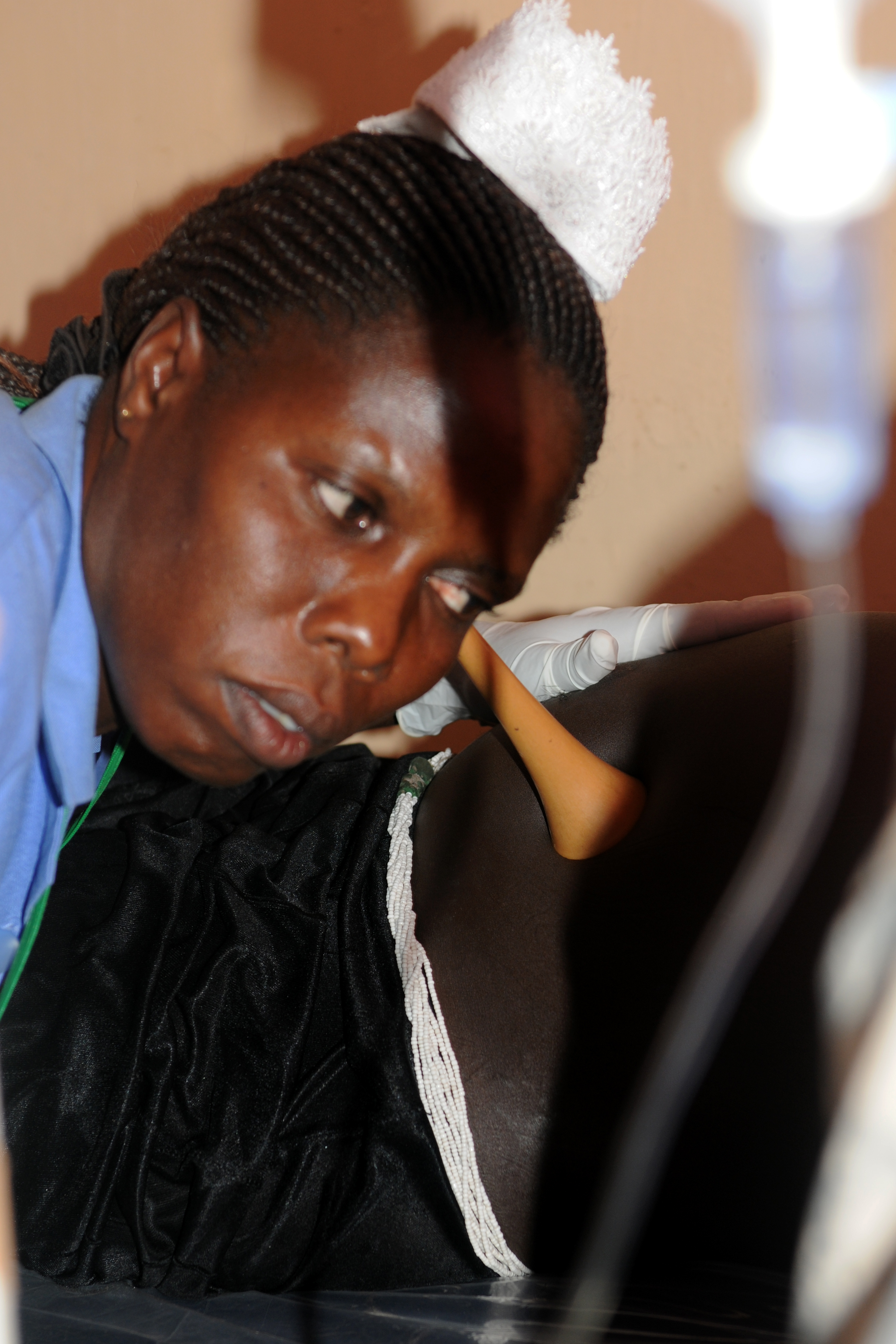
A U.S. Army Reserve nurse uses a Pinard horn in Uganda (2009).

A Pinard horn is a type of stethoscope used to listen to the heart rate of a fetus during pregnancy. It is a hollow horn, often made of wood or metal, about 200 millimetres (7.9 in) long. It functions similarly to an ear trumpet by amplifying sound. The user holds the wide end of the horn against the pregnant woman's abdomen, and listens through the other end.

== History ==
The Pinard horn was invented by Dr. Adolphe Pinard, a French obstetrician, during the 19th century. Pinard was an early supporter of advancements in prenatal care, including closer fetal health monitoring. The invention came about in 1895.

== Current use ==
Pinard horns continue to be used around the world, particularly by midwives, and also by doctors and nurses. It provides an alternative to the more expensive Doppler fetal monitor. Another alternative is the fetoscope, which is a stethoscope designed for auscultating fetuses. Below is a quote from a midwife in Mexico describing the Pinard horn:

Sometimes we listen to the fetal heart rate with the Pinard, but if the woman is very sensitive, and it bothers her to push into her belly with the Pinard horn, then we use the Doppler. But the Doppler often transmits a lot of noise; it gets confusing. So better with the Pinard.

A Pinard horn may be used to determine the position of the fetus. A Pinard horn is more precise than a Doppler device for this purpose. A Doppler device detects a heart tone further away from the location of origin. A Pinard horn must be pressed to a location very close to the fetal heart in order to detect it, providing a more accurate indication of fetal position. A doctor, nurse, or midwife can also use palpation and auscultation to determine fetal position.

== Current Models ==
The Pinard Horn has been made out of wood, metal, and plastic. It has taken the form of a conventional stethoscope, where instead of holding the horn between one's ear and the pregnant body, there are earpieces and the horn is attached to a cable.

== See also ==
- Doppler ultrasound
- Fetal heart rate
- Fetoscopy
