= Ear trumpet =

Funnel-shaped device to improve hearing

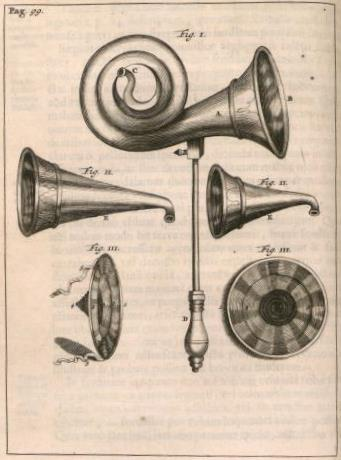
An 18th-century drawing of ear trumpets

An ear trumpet is a tubular or funnel-shaped device which collects sound waves and leads them into the ear. They are used as hearing aids, resulting in a strengthening of the sound energy impact to the eardrum and thus improved hearing for a deaf or hard-of-hearing individual. Ear trumpets were made of sheet metal, silver, wood, snail shells or animal horns. They have largely been replaced in wealthier areas of the world by modern hearing aid technology that is much smaller and less obtrusive, albeit more expensive.

A sound trumpet does not "amplify" sound. It takes the sound power received over a large area and concentrates it into a smaller area. The received sound is louder, but no power has been created in the process.

== History ==
The use of ear trumpets for the partially deaf dates back to the 17th century. The earliest description of an ear trumpet was given by the French Jesuit priest and mathematician Jean Leurechon in his work Recreations mathématiques (1634). Polymath Athanasius Kircher also described a similar device in 1650.

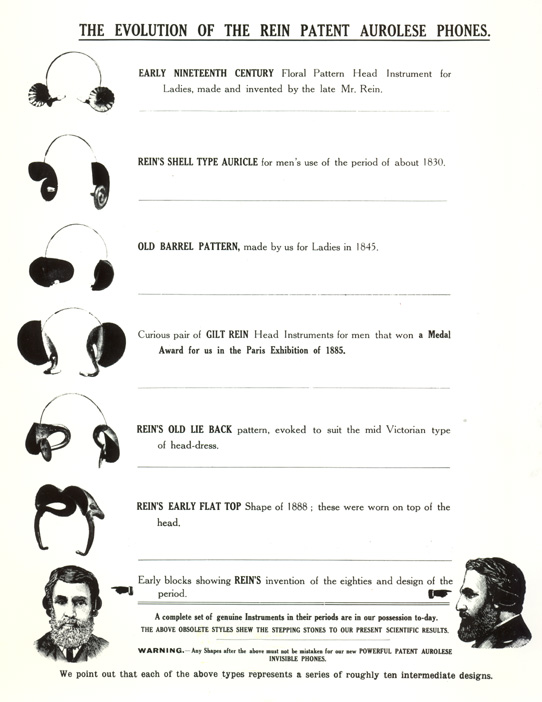
Frederick Rein Ltd.'s catalog, displaying evolving 19th-century designs

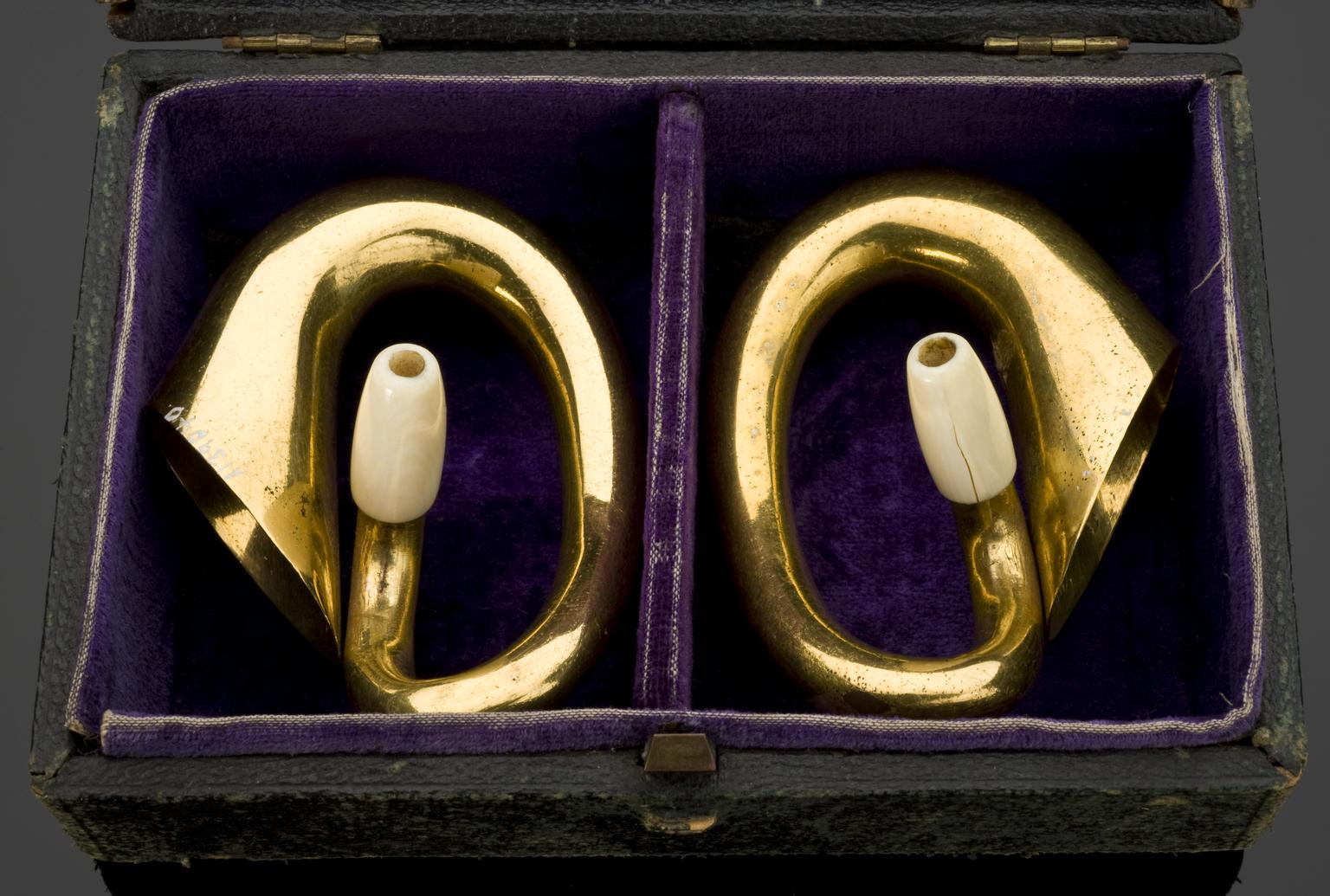
Pair of miniature brass 'bugle' ear trumpets invented by ear, nose and throat specialist Jean Pierre Bonnafont (1805–1891) and manufactured by Frederick C. Rein & Son. They are designed to be worn under the hair. On display at the Science Museum London : Medicine : The Wellcome Galleries.

By the late 18th century, their use was becoming increasingly common. Collapsible conical ear trumpets were made by instrument makers on a one-off basis for specific clients. Well-known models of the period included the Townsend Trumpet (made by the deaf educator John Townshend), the Reynolds Trumpet (specially built for painter Joshua Reynolds) and the Daubeney Trumpet.

The first firm to begin commercial production of the ear trumpet was established by Frederick C. Rein in London in 1800. In addition to producing ear trumpets, Rein also sold hearing fans and speaking tubes. These instruments helped concentrate sound energy, while still being portable. However, these devices were generally bulky and had to be physically supported from below. Later, smaller, hand-held ear trumpets and cones were used as hearing aids.

Rein was commissioned to design a special acoustic chair for the ailing King of Portugal, John VI of Portugal in 1819. The throne was designed with ornately carved arms that looked like the open mouths of lions. These holes acted as the receiving area for the acoustics, which were transmitted to the back of the throne via a speaking tube, and into the king's ear. Finally in the late 1800s, the acoustic horn, which was a tube that had two ends, a cone that captured sound, and was eventually made to fit in the ear.

Johann Nepomuk Mälzel began manufacturing ear trumpets in the 1810s. He notably produced ear trumpets for Ludwig van Beethoven, who was starting to go deaf at the time. These are now kept in the Beethoven Museum in Bonn.

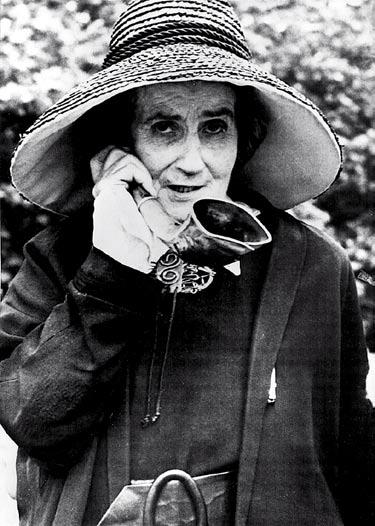
Madame de Meuron using an ear trumpet

Toward the late 19th century, hidden hearing aids became increasingly popular. Rein pioneered many notable designs, including his 'acoustic headbands', where the hearing aid device was artfully concealed within the hair or headgear. Reins' Aurolese Phones were headbands, made in a variety of shapes, that incorporated sound collectors near the ear that would improve the acoustics. Hearing aids were also hidden in couches, clothing, and accessories. This drive toward ever-increasing invisibility was often more about hiding the individual's disability from the public than about helping the individual cope with his problem.

F. C. Rein and Son of London ended its ear trumpet-manufacturing activity in 1963, as both the first and last company of its kind.

== Pinard horn ==
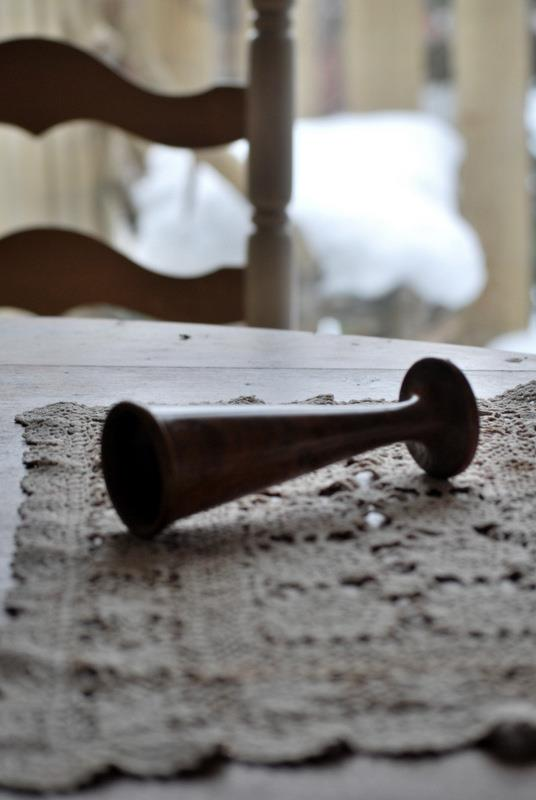
Wooden Pinard horn

A Pinard horn is a type of stethoscope used by midwives that is designed similarly to an ear trumpet. It is a wooden cone about 8 inches long. The midwife presses the wide end of the horn against the pregnant woman's belly to monitor heart tones. Pinard horns were invented in France in the 19th century, and are still in use in many places worldwide.

== See also ==
- Cochlear implant
- Hearing aid
- History of hearing aids
- Stethoscope
