= Priscos =

- Civil parish
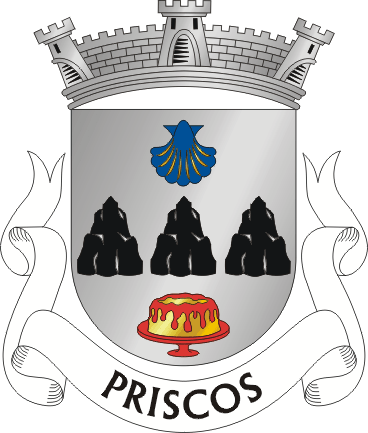
- Coat of arms

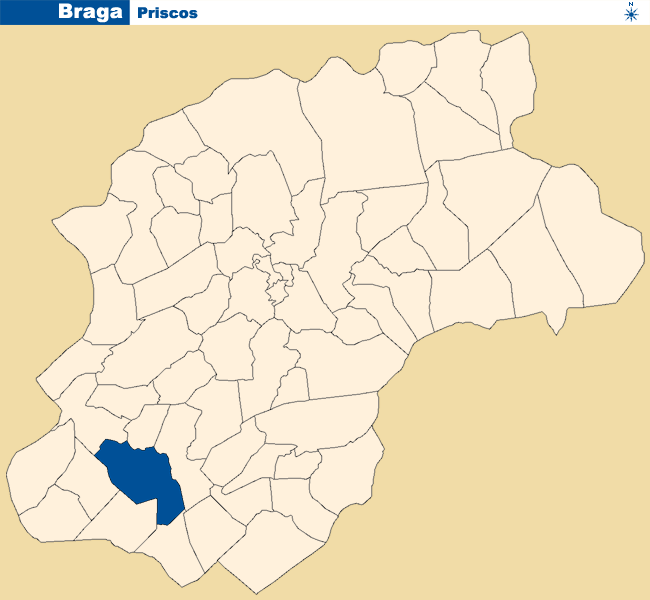
- Coordinates: 41.495°N 8.474°W
- Country: Portugal
- Region: Norte
- Intermunic. comm.: Cávado
- District: Braga
- Municipality: Braga

Area
  - Total: 3.65 km^{2} (1.41 sq mi)

Population (2011)
  - Total: 1,341
  - Density: 370/km^{2} (950/sq mi)
- Time zone: UTC+00:00 (WET)
  - Summer (DST): UTC+01:00 (WEST)

Priscos is a Portuguese parish, located in the municipality of Braga. The population in 2011 was 1,341, in an area of 3.65 km^{2}.
