= Shanxi cuisine =

Culinary traditions of Shanxi province, China

- Chinese: 山西菜
Transcriptions
Standard Mandarin
- Hanyu Pinyin: Shānxī cài

Jin cuisine
- Traditional Chinese: 晉菜
- Simplified Chinese: 晋菜
Transcriptions
Standard Mandarin
- Hanyu Pinyin: Jìn cài

Shanxi cuisine, or Jin cuisine, is derived from the native cooking styles of Shanxi Province in China. Local dishes include noodles, fried flatbread (da bing), and vinegar. Sour tastes are typical.

Shanxi cuisine is not well known outside the region, partially due to its lower population compared to other provinces.

Pork, chicken and lamb are among the most common meats—goat, and sheep offal are also often used. For example, lamb soup is usually cooked with livers, stomach and other offal. Lamb is used in Shanxi in ways that combines the cuisines of Northern Chinese minorities and Han Chinese. For example, using ground lamb and carrots as a dumpling filling, is something that is not found in any other Chinese cooking styles. Ground pork with chopped dill is another popular dumpling filling.

The main staples reflect the crops commonly grown in Shanxi: millet, sorghum, and wheat. Pork, mushrooms, potatoes and turnips are frequently used.

== Styles ==
Shanxi cuisine comprises three styles:

- Northern Shanxi style: Represented by dishes from Datong and Mount Wutai, with emphasis on colour and oil. More oil and seasoning are important.
- Southern Shanxi style: Represented by dishes from Linfen and the Grand Canal regions, specialising in seafood, despite the fact that Shanxi is a landlocked province, the taste is light.
- Central Shanxi style: Represented by dishes from Taiyuan, which presents a mainstream cooking style compared to both the northern and southern regions of the province. It is the combination of southern and northern flavors, with fine selection of ingredients and a salty taste. Before the 1970s, as local cuisine and professional cooking had not been influenced by Cantonese and Sichuan styles, Taiyuan cuisine contained a number of noodle dishes, Chinese Muslim dishes, local hot pot dishes, and meat dishes using fresh water seafood and lamb. The region is especially famous for its knife-shaven noodles (dao xiao mian).

== Shanxi mature vinegar ==
Shanxi mature vinegar, also called Shanxi lao chencu (山西老陈醋; 山西老陳醋; Shānxī lǎo chén cù) in Chinese, is a special type of vinegar produced in Shanxi Province. Based on the techniques used to prepare the vinegar, it should be more accurately called "aged Shanxi vinegar" or "extra aged vinegar".

Shanxi old vinegar (also known as Old Chen vinegar) is one of the four famous vinegars in China. The smell and flavour changes as it is stored. Shanxi old vinegar can be kept for 9–12 months in general, and some better vinegars can be kept for at least 3–10 years. Some of the methods used in brewing the vinegar have been considered intellectual properties and are under the protection of Chinese laws.

It is a famous product of the region, and is produced primarily in Qingxu County, a vicinity of the provincial capital of Taiyuan. The Shanxi Vinegar Culture Museum has been built there. Local Taiyuan residents, especially those who have lived there for generations, prefer Donghu Mature Vinegar (东湖老陈醋; 東湖老陳醋; donghu) produced by Shanxi Mature Vinegar Group, which is the largest mature vinegar manufacturer in China. There is also Ninghuafu Yiyuanqing (宁化府益源庆; 寧化府益源慶; Nínghuàfǔ Yìyuánqìng), a brand of vinegar produced by the Yiyuanqing Company in the old downtown area of Taiyuan.

== Notable dishes ==
English	Traditional Chinese	Simplified Chinese	Pinyin	Image	Notes
Cat's ear	貓耳朵	猫耳朵	māo ěrduō		Noodles shaped like a cat's ears. Similar to orecchiette.
Youmian kaolaolao	莜面栲栳栳	莜面栲栳栳	Yóu miàn kàolaolao		Hulless oat flour rolls shaped like biscuit rolls
Fu Shan brains	傅山頭腦	傅山头脑	Fù Shān tóunǎo		A soup made from lamb, rice wine, yam and other spices. Despite its name, it has nothing to do with brains. It is named after Fu Shan (傅山; 1607–1684), a scholar and artist from Taiyuan. It is traditionally enjoyed during winter and is said to be nutritious.
Datong knife-shaved noodles	大同刀削麵	大同刀削面	Dàtóng dāo xiāo miàn		Willow-leaf-shaped noodle made by sharp sheet iron.
Liangpi	涼皮	凉皮	liáng pí		Cold rice noodle with spicy chili oil. Also called 面皮 (miàn pí), which is made translucent by washing out the gluten prior to cooking.
Minbagu	抿八股	抿八股	mǐn bā gǔ		
Pingyao beef	平遙牛肉	平遥牛肉	Píngyáo niúròu		Beef specially produced in Pingyao County
Shanxi crispy duck	山西香酥鴨	山西香酥鸭	Shānxī xiāng sū yā		The duck is steamed first and then pan-fried. This creates a crispy and rich taste without making the duck meat too greasy.
Soy cheese steamed pork					Pork is stir -fried first, then steamed in a big bowl together with red salty soy cheese curd (similar to the one used in Beijing cuisine), ginger and garlic. When done, the pork has a creamy, soft, lightly sweet and richly savoury taste from the soy cheese and pork fat. The pork is thinly sliced and served with fresh herbs.
Sweet and sour meatballs	糖醋丸子	糖醋丸子	táng cù wánzǐ		
Taigu cake	太谷餅	太谷饼	Tàigǔ bǐng		A type of pastry from Taigu County
Huamo	花饃	花馍	huāmó		A type of decorated, specially shaped mantou.
Braised String Bean with noodles (menmian)	燜面	焖面	mēn mìan	Shanxi Braised String Beans with noodles	The area north of Jinzhong, including the area to the north, is called stewed noodles. By stewing the noodles and stir-frying them with the vegetables you want to eat.
Shanxi Chow Mein	炒麵	炒面（炒揪片）			Pull the noodles into slices and then stir-fry them with vegetables.
Shanxi Oil Tea	油茶	油茶			Shanxi oil tea includes flour, walnuts, peanuts, Xinjiang padamones, cooked sesame seeds, and olive oil. It is a traditional snack in Jinzhong, Shanxi.
Liulin Wantuan	柳林碗團	柳林碗团	liǔ lín wǎn tuán		Liulin Wantuan is made of buckwheat noodles, steamed in a small bowl and then seasoned with garlic, chili and vinegar as the main ingredients.
