= Cake Wrecks =

Website

- Website type: Entertainment photoblog
- Available in: English
- Owner: Jen Yates
- Website: http://cakewrecks.com/
- Commercial: Yes
- Launched: May 2008

Cake Wrecks is an entertainment website featuring user-submitted photographs of professionally made cakes that are unintentionally humorous or strange in appearance. Founded in May 2008, inspiration for the confectionery-themed photoblog began when site-master Jen Yates received an e-mail that included a photo of a sheet cake, decorated with a customer's verbatim request: "best wishes suzanne, under neat that, we will miss you".

== History ==
Yates, a resident of Orlando, Florida, began searching for images of what she describes as "unintentionally silly, sad, creepy or inappropriate" cakes. She posted the images to her new blog, Cake Wrecks, but assumed a limited supply of strange cake photography would result in the blog running out of available material. An increasing amount of "Wrecker" photos submitted by site readers revealed "cake wrecks" are inevitable in the baking industry. Blog entries have included photos of cakes decorated with sonogram images, an image depicting sexual harassment, and a message reading "i lave you".

Described as an Internet phenomenon by The New York Times, Cake Wrecks quickly gained in popularity. Mary Alice Yeskey, an employee at Baltimore's Charm City Cakes and co-star of the reality television show Ace of Cakes, explained why fellow bakers visit Cake Wrecks: "Everyone in the baking business follows Cake Wrecks almost daily, if only to make sure our cakes aren't ending up on there." On Sundays, in a break from Cake Wrecks' typical format, exemplary edible art creations are featured instead of "wrecks".

By the end of 2008, approximately 100,000 users visited Cake Wrecks each day and the website had received two blog awards: the 2008 Blogger's Choice Award for Best Humor Blog and the 2008 Weblog Award for Best Food Blog. During the 2009 Weblog Awards ceremony, also known as "The Bloggies", Cake Wrecks was named Best Food Blog, Best New Weblog, and Best Writing of a Weblog.

== Print ==
In 2009, Yates compiled user-submitted photos for her book, Cake Wrecks: When Professional Cakes Go Hilariously Wrong, which debuted at No. 9 on the New York Times Best Seller list for hardcover advice. A second book, Wreck the Halls: Cake Wrecks Gets "Festive", was published in October 2011.

== See also ==
- List of Internet phenomena
