= Cake icing =

Cake icing may refer to

- Icing (food), often used on cakes
- Cake decorating, often including the use of icing
