= Fondant icing =

Icing used on cakes and pastries

Fondant
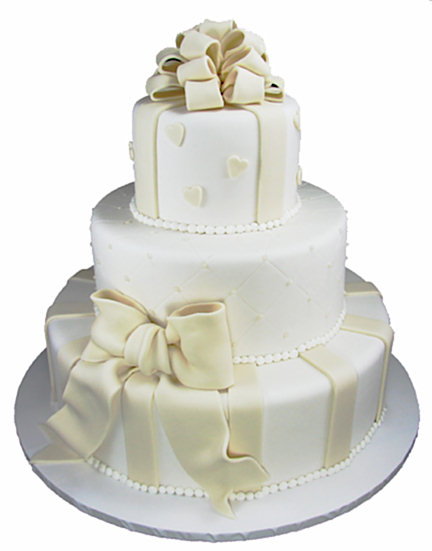
- Wedding cake covered and decorated with fondant
- Type: Confectionery
- Place of origin: France
- Main ingredients: Poured fondant: sugar, water, gelatin, glycerine Rolled fondant: sugar, water, gelatin or agar, food-grade glycerine

Fondant icing, also commonly just called fondant (/ˈfɒndənt/, French: [fɔ̃dɑ̃]; French for 'melting'), is an icing used to decorate or sculpt cakes and pastries. It is made from sugar, water, gelatin, vegetable oil or shortening, and glycerol. It does not have the texture of most icings; rolled fondant is akin to modelling clay, while poured fondant is a thick liquid. The flavor and texture are generally considered a weak point, as it is sweet and chalky. It is generally chosen for its appearance rather than flavor.

The word, in French, means 'melting,' coming from the same root as fondue and foundry.

== Rolled fondant ==
Rolled fondant, fondant icing, or pettinice, which is not the same material as poured fondant, is commonly used to decorate wedding cakes. Although wedding cakes are traditionally made with marzipan or royal icing, fondant is increasingly common due to nut allergies, as it does not require almond meal. Rolled fondant includes gelatin (or agar in vegetarian recipes) and food-grade glycerine, which keeps the sugar pliable and creates a dough-like consistency. Rolled fondant is rolled out like a pie crust and used to cover the cake. The result is a perfectly smooth surface that is well-suited for aesthetic expression, especially for complex shapes, such as large ruffles, that would be difficult to make with a softer icing. It also takes food coloring well.

Rolled fondant is very sweet but otherwise is not considered to taste good or to have an appealing texture. Some bakers who use it recommend against eating it.

Alternatives to rolled fondant include marzipan and mochi.

Types include:

Ready-made rolled fondant
Commercial, shelf-stable, pre-made rolled fondant often consists principally of sugar and hydrogenated oil. However, different formulations for commercial shelf-stable fondant are available and include other ingredients, such as sugar, cellulose gum, and water.
Marshmallow fondant
Marshmallow fondant is a form of rolled fondant often made and used by home bakers and hobbyists. Marshmallow fondant is made by combining melted shelf-stable marshmallows, water, powdered sugar, and solid vegetable shortening. Home bakers use this recipe for homemade fondant due to the readily available access to required ingredients.
Sculpting fondant
Sculpting fondant is similar to rolled fondant but with a stiffer consistency, which makes it a good sculpting material.
Sugar paste
Sugar paste, also called gum paste, is similar to rolled fondant, but hardens completely—and therefore is used for bigger cake decorations, such as bride and groom figures, bigger flowers, etc. Sugar paste is made mainly of egg whites, powdered sugar, and shortening. Tylose can be added to make gum paste more pliable for detailed work.

== Gallery ==
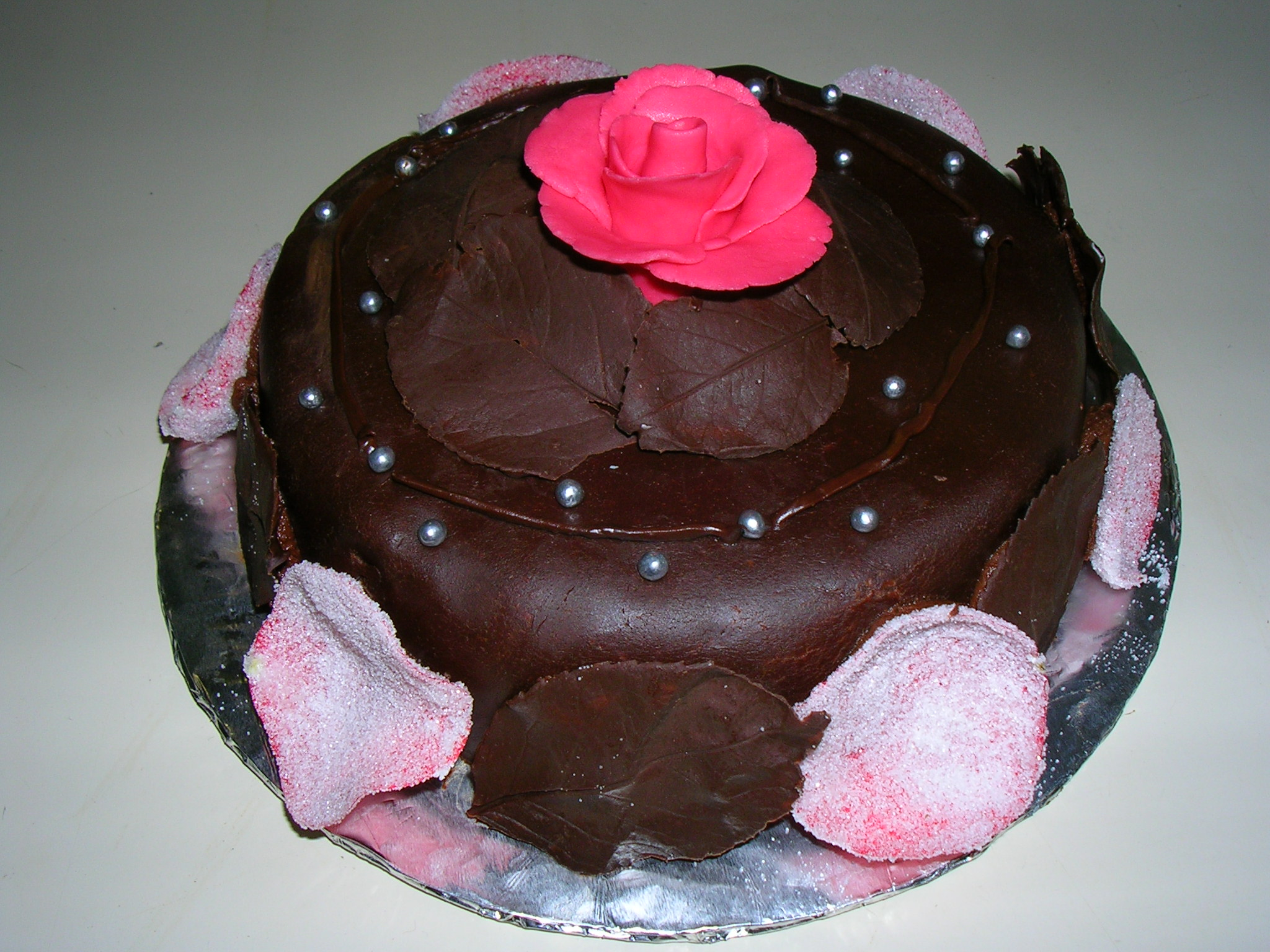
Cake covered with chocolate rolled fondant

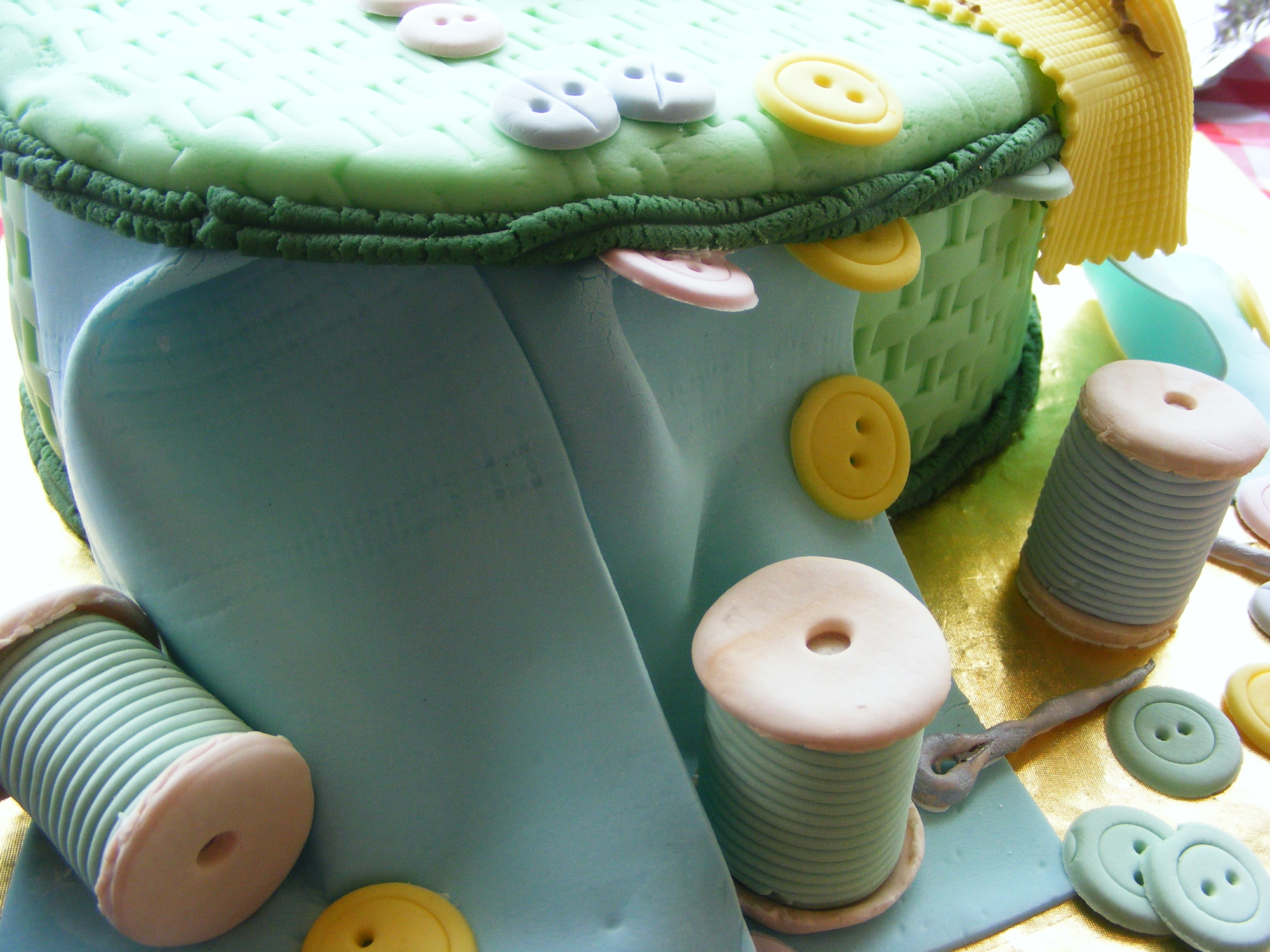
A fondant-covered cake depicting a sewing kit

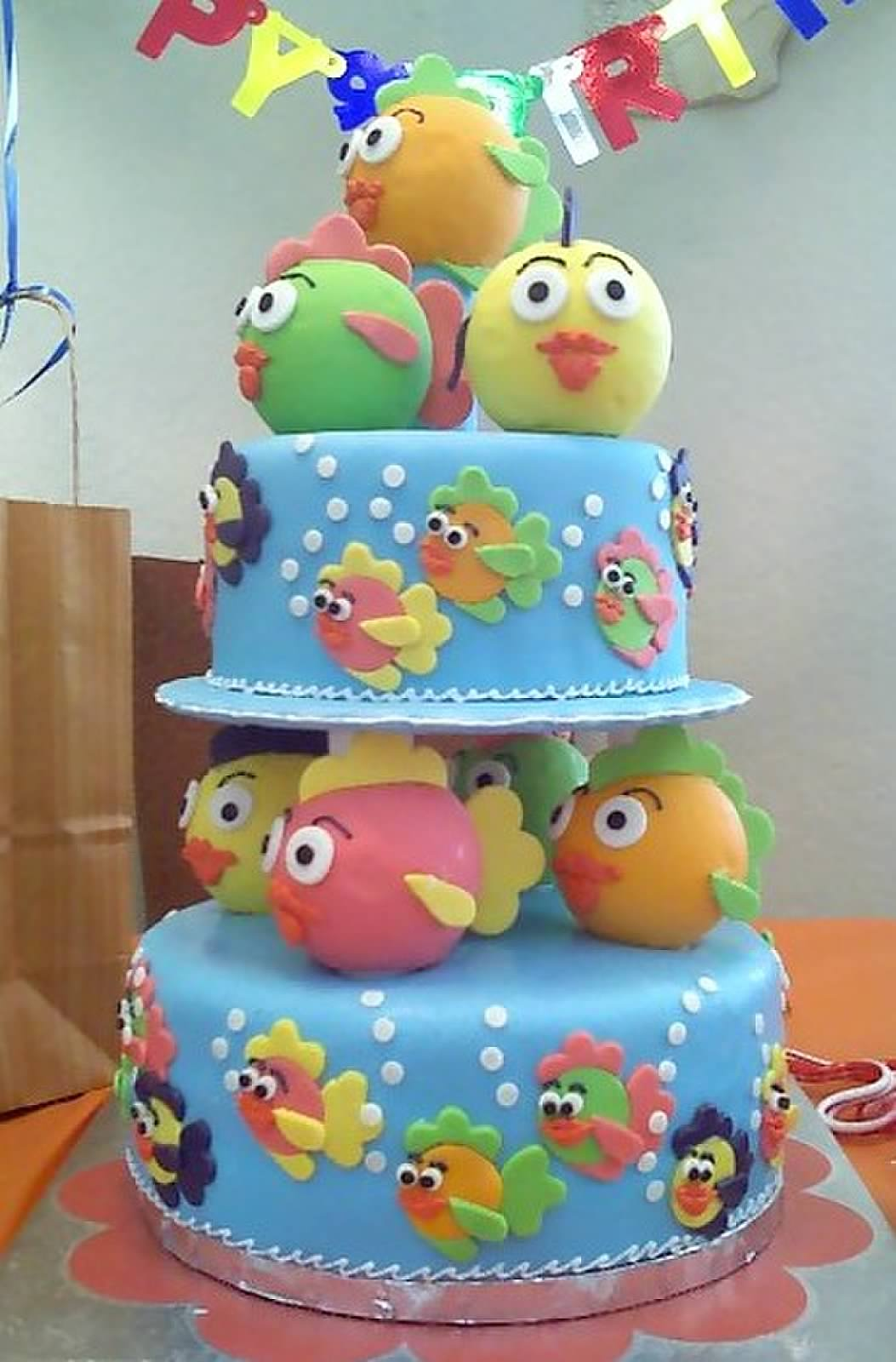
The appliqué method uses one or more layers of cutout rolled fondant pieces to provide color and depth.

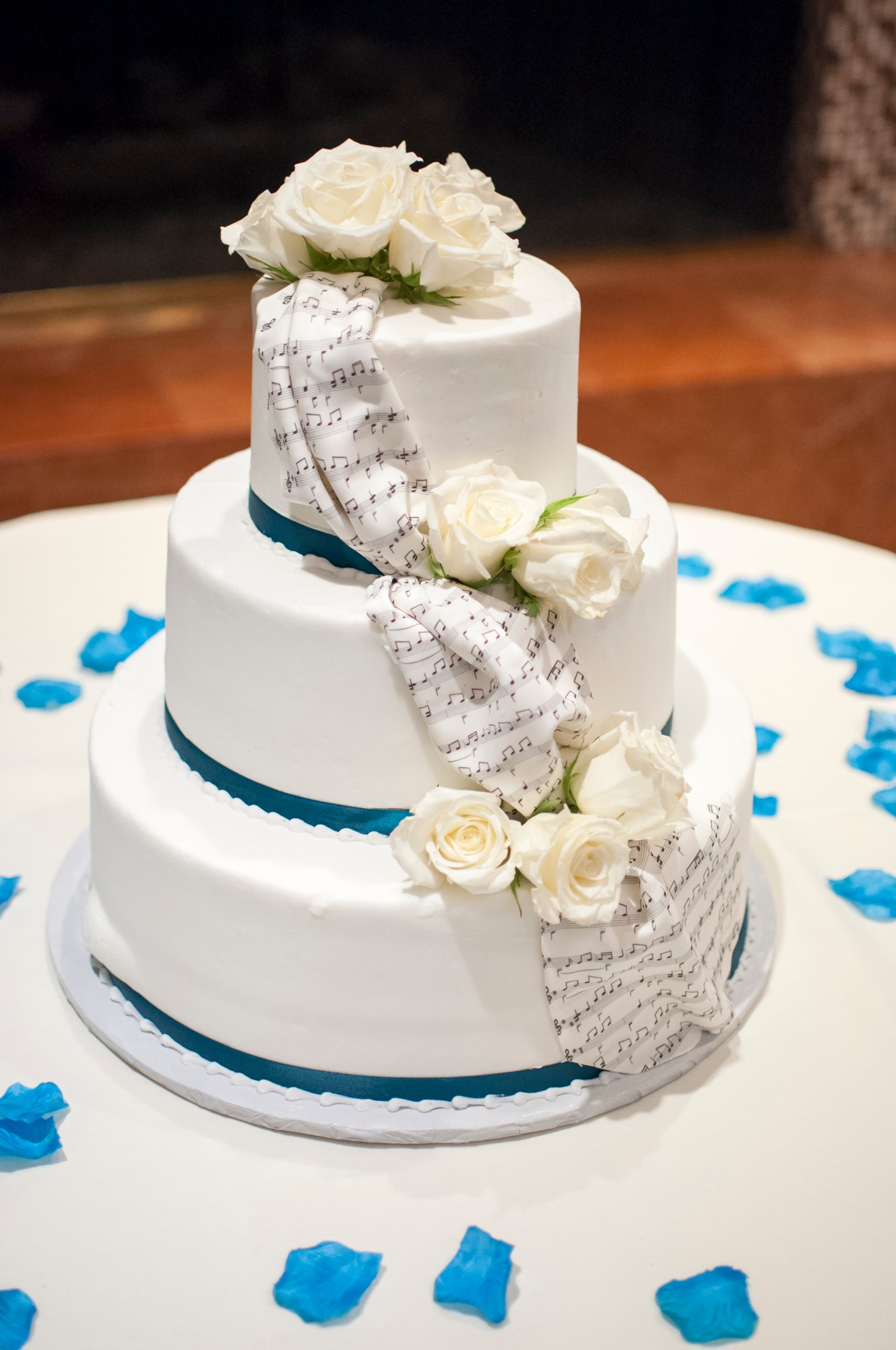
Fondant-covered cake with flowers

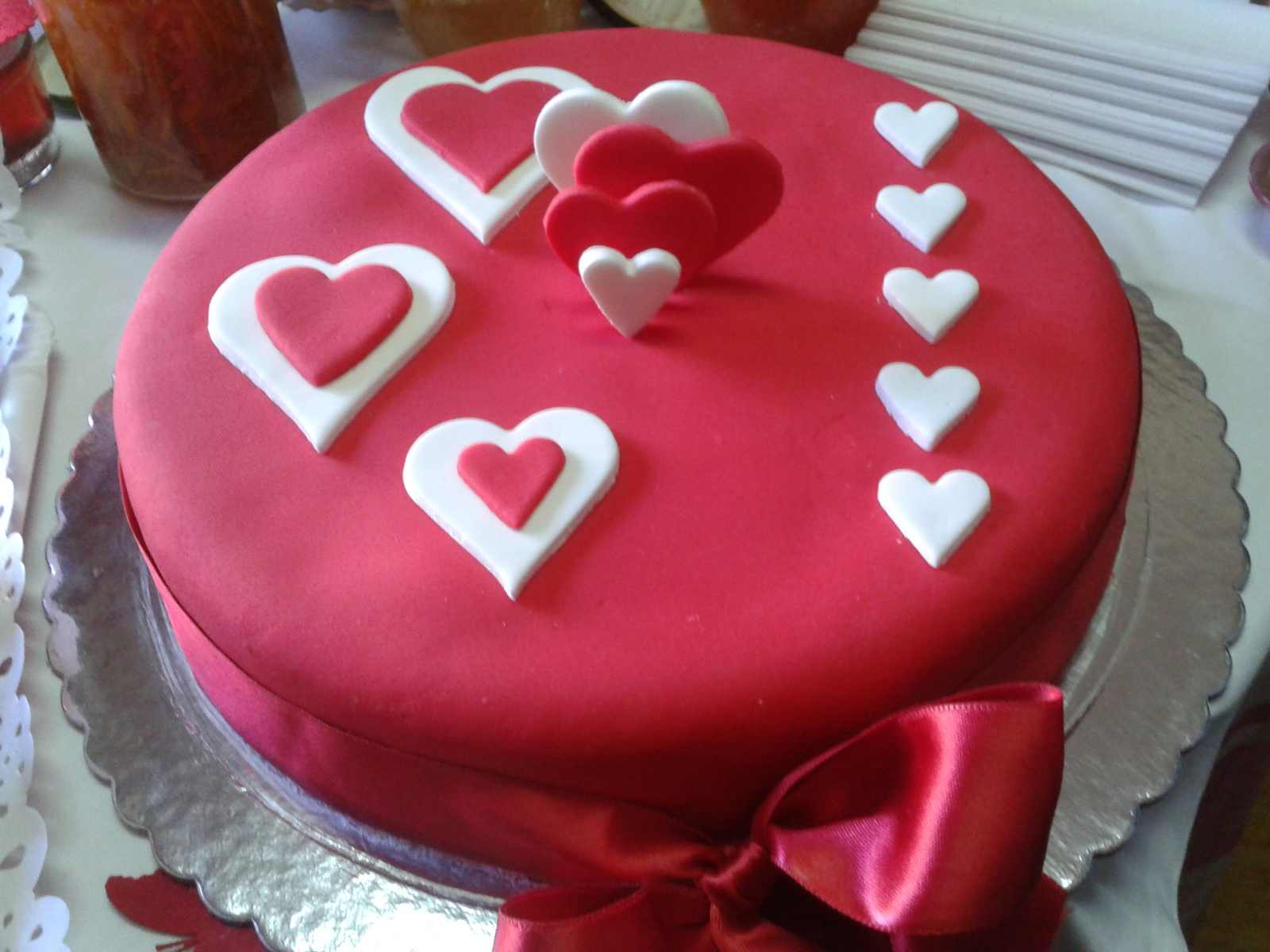
Red fondant on a Valentine's Day cake

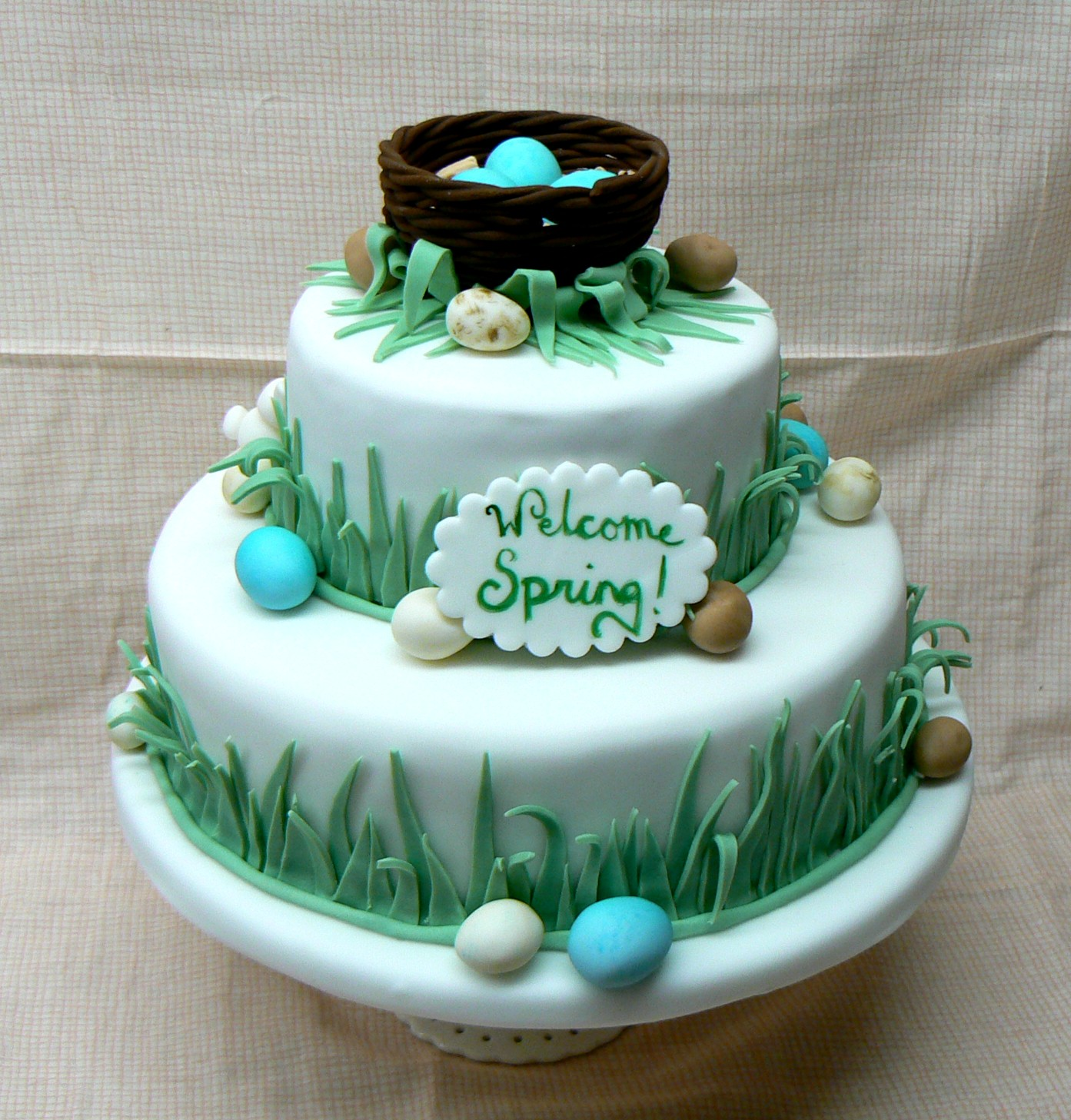
Fondant in the shape of eggs

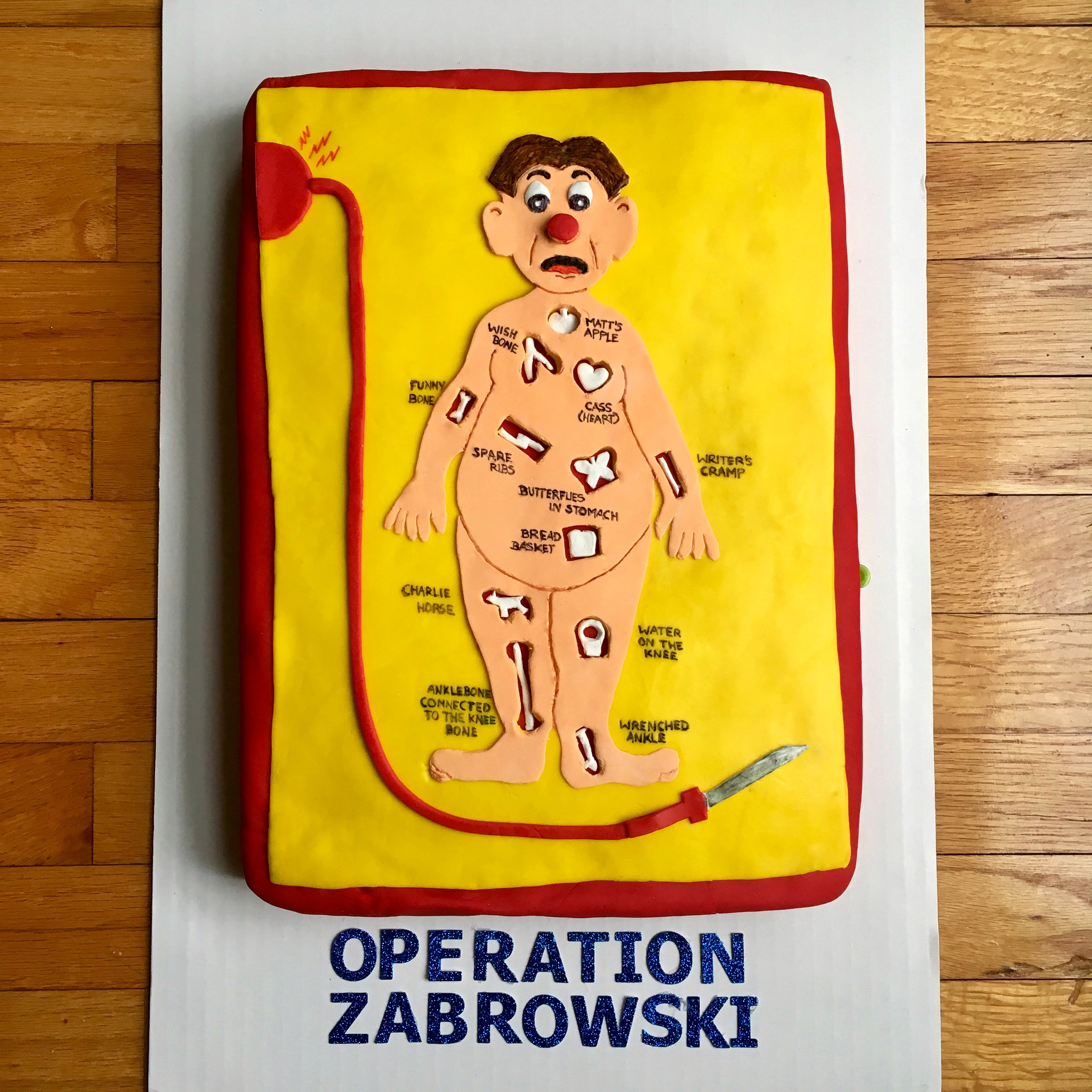
"Operation" cake made of fondant

== See also ==
- Ganache
- Royal icing
