= Fondant =

Type of confection, filling, or icing

Fondant is a mixture of sugar and water used as a confection, filling, or icing. Sometimes gelatin and glycerine are used as softeners or stabilizers.

There are numerous varieties of fondant, with the most basic being poured fondant. Others include fondant icing, chocolate fondant, and honey fondant.

== Poured fondant ==
Poured fondant is a creamy confection used as a filling or coating for cakes, pastries, and candies or sweets. In its simplest form, it is sugar and water. Sometimes it is stabilized with gelatin and glycerine. It is cooked to the soft-ball stage, cooled slightly, and stirred or beaten to incorporate air, until it is an opaque mass with a creamy consistency. Sometimes lemon or vanilla is added to the mixture for taste. Other flavorings are used as well, as are various colorings. An example of its use is the Cadbury Creme Egg, the filling of which is inverted sugar syrup, produced by processing fondant with invertase. Fondant fancies are a type of cake typically coated in poured fondant.

== Physical chemistry ==
Poured fondant is formed by supersaturating water with sucrose. More than twice as much sugar dissolves in water at the boiling point as at room temperature. After the sucrose dissolves, if the solution is left to cool undisturbed, the sugar remains dissolved in a supersaturated solution until nucleation occurs. While the solution is supersaturated, if a seed crystal (undissolved sucrose) is put into the mix or if the solution is agitated, the dissolved sucrose crystallizes to form large, crunchy crystals (which is how rock candy is made). However, if the solution is left to cool undisturbed and is then stirred vigorously, it forms many tiny crystals, resulting in a smooth-textured fondant.

== See also ==
- Marzipan
- Pastry cream
- Sugar paste
