= Cake copyright =

Copyright applied to baked dessert

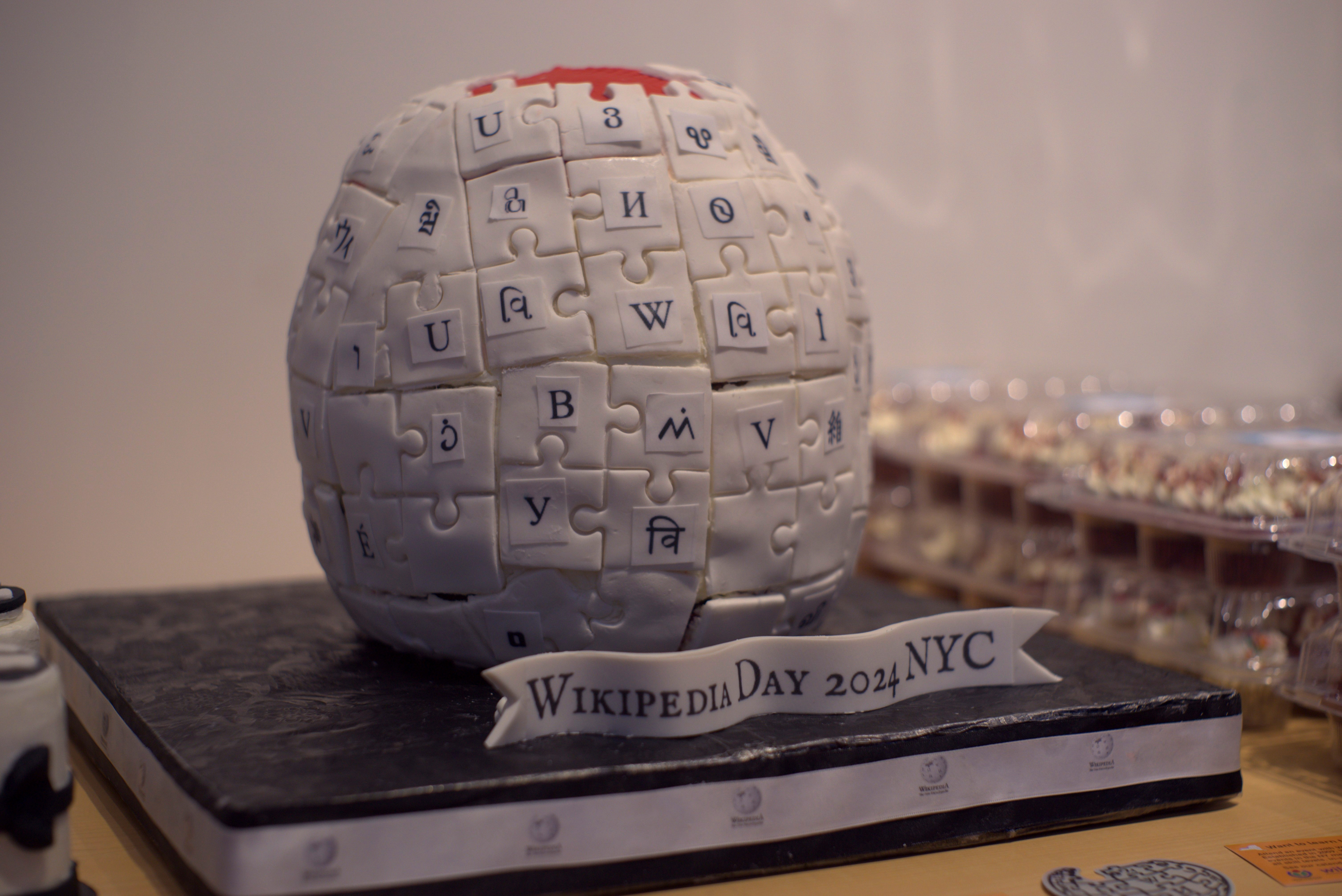
The Wikipedia logo is licensed under a Creative Commons license (CC BY-SA) and is thus permissible to use for making cakes, such as this red velvet cake.

Cake copyright is the assertion of copyright on a cake. Cakes, as edible art, can be an artistic medium for displaying an image or portraying a character.

== Copyright of art on cakes ==
If cake decorating is used as a medium for presenting copyrighted content, then copyright issues might come into play as with any other publication medium. Entertainment media organizations including Disney, Lucasfilm, and Sanrio have asserted that cakes should not portray their copyrighted fictional characters or their copyrighted images without licensing.

== Copyright on cake design ==
Cake design is an imagining of a cake as copyrightable art, like a sculpture.

Bakeries which provide cakes which critics have ridiculed for low quality have sometimes sought to claim copyright over their cakes. The copyright claim is part of an attempt to enforce demands that communities of people who mock cakes not publish photos of cakes for entertainment.

== Presidential inaugurations ==
In 2012, President Barack Obama of the United States had celebrity pastry chef Duff Goldman design a cake for a party celebrating his second inauguration. In 2017, President Donald Trump had a Washington, D.C. bakery replicate Obama's cake made for his inauguration. There was discussion about whether Trump plagiarized Obama's cake. The matter raised the profile of copyright questions about cakes.
