= Cake decorating =

Art of decorating a cake

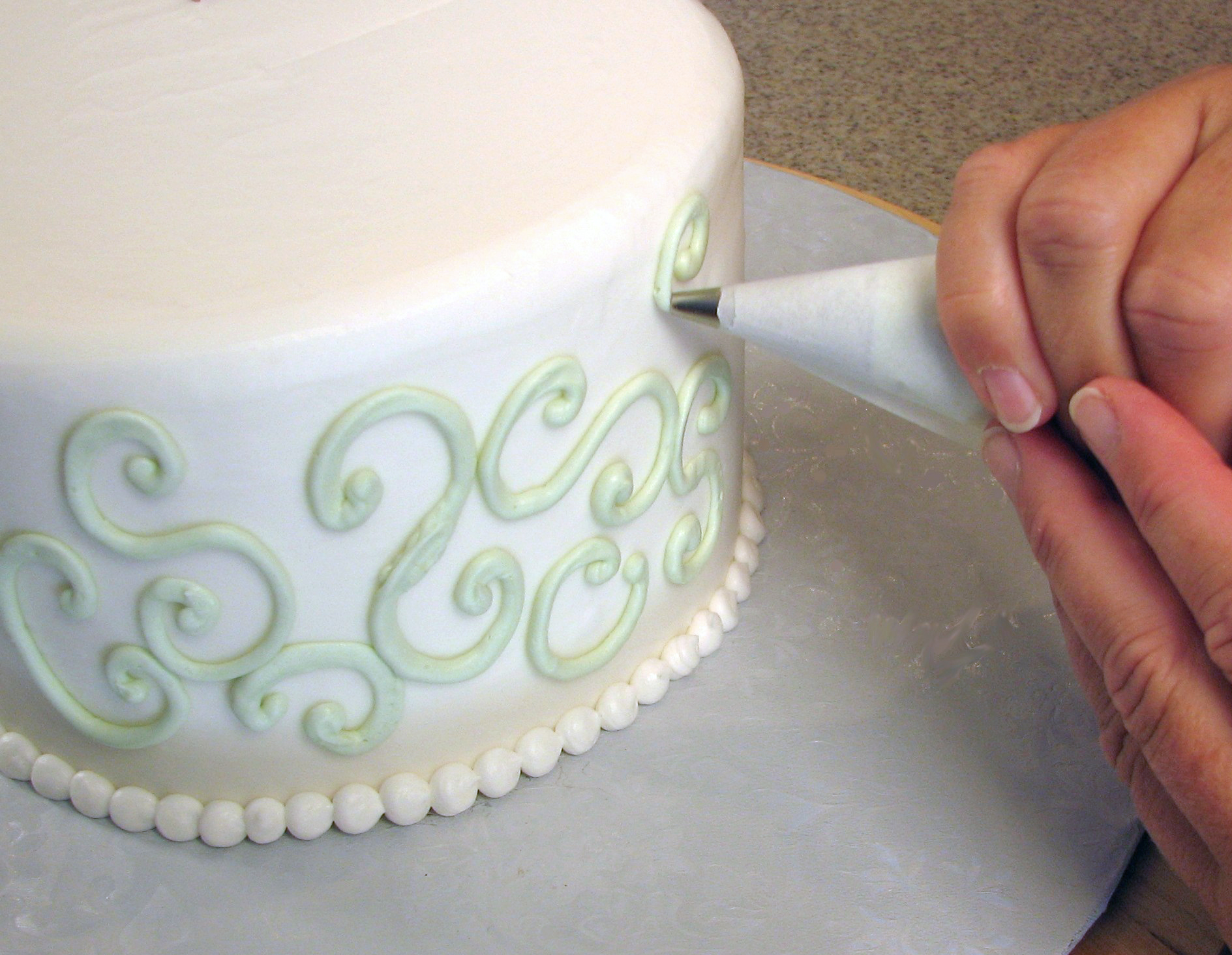
Buttercream swirls are piped onto the sides of a cake with a pastry bag.

Cake decorating is the art of decorating a cake for special occasions such as birthdays, weddings, baby showers, national or religious holidays or as a promotional item.

It is a form of sugar art that uses materials such as icing, fondant, frosting and other edible decorations. An artisan may use simple or elaborate three-dimensional shapes as a part of the decoration, or on the entire cake. Chocolate is regularly used to decorate cakes as it can be melted and mixed with cream to make a ganache. Cocoa powder and powered sugar are often used in the process and can be lightly dusted as a finishing touch.

Cake decoration has been featured on TV channels such as TLC, Food Network, and Discovery Family as a form of entertainment. Cake Boss is a well-known TLC program dedicated to the art behind cake decorating.

== History ==
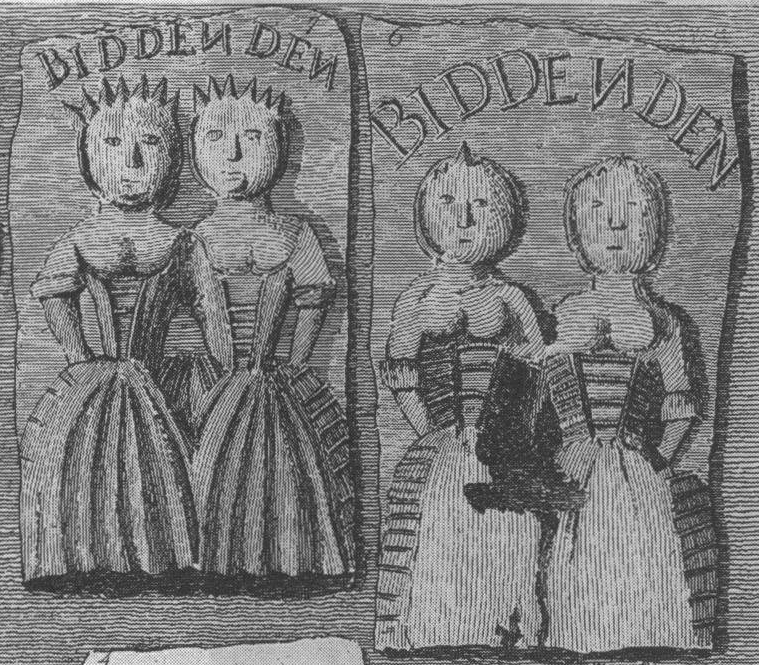
Two 18th century cakes, said to depict the Biddenden Maids, Mary and Eliza Chulkhurst

The decoration of cakes arose in 17th century Europe, typically for special occasions as a luxury good. At this time, a cake decorator was an honored profession. When wedding cakes became part of the wedding ceremony, early cake decorators looked for ways to give wedding cakes a more outstanding look. The long tradition and history of the wedding cake paved the way for modern cake decoration. The first figure to begin the decoration of a wedding cake was the 18th century cookbook author Elizabeth Raffald. Christmas cakes began to be decorated in the 18th and 19th centuries, having evolved from Twelfth Night cakes, an earlier tradition that was baked and eaten on Twelfth Night, or the Feast of the Epiphany. These cakes were considerably rich and would be decorated elaborately only by the artist bakers to their own expense.

The invention of baking powder in the 19th century allowed cakes to become lighter and fluffier than traditional pound cakes. During the 1840s, the advent of temperature-controlled ovens and the production of baking powder made baking cakes an easier process. As temperature control technology improved, an increased emphasis on presentation and ornamentation developed. Many wedding cakes are decorated layer cakes consisting of multiple cake layers separated by fillings such as frosting or jam. Cakes began to take on decorative shapes and were adorned with additional icing formed into patterns, including floral patterns, and food coloring was used to accent frosting or layers of the cake.

During the 1950s, cake mix manufacturers promoted cake decorating as a way for home bakers to express creativity, helping revive sales of boxed cake mixes. Although baking from scratch decreased during the later part of the 20th century in the United States, due to the increase in availability of ready-made cakes and cake mixes, decorated cakes have remained an important part of celebrations, such as weddings, anniversaries, birthdays, showers and other special occasions. Birthday cakes became more accessible to ordinary families during the Industrial Revolution because ingredients and baking supplies became more widely available. The 21st century has made space for those who consider cake decorating their profession.

== Types ==
A cake may be decorated using small adornments or embellishments made separately and placed on top of or around the cake, or may be decorated by being covered with a form of icing or paste, either alone or in accompaniment to other decorations. Cake decorations can be made of edible material and food-safe plastics. Present day cake artists frequently use cooled buttercream to make extravagant designs in the form of roses, figures, and other normal decor.

=== Fondant icing ===
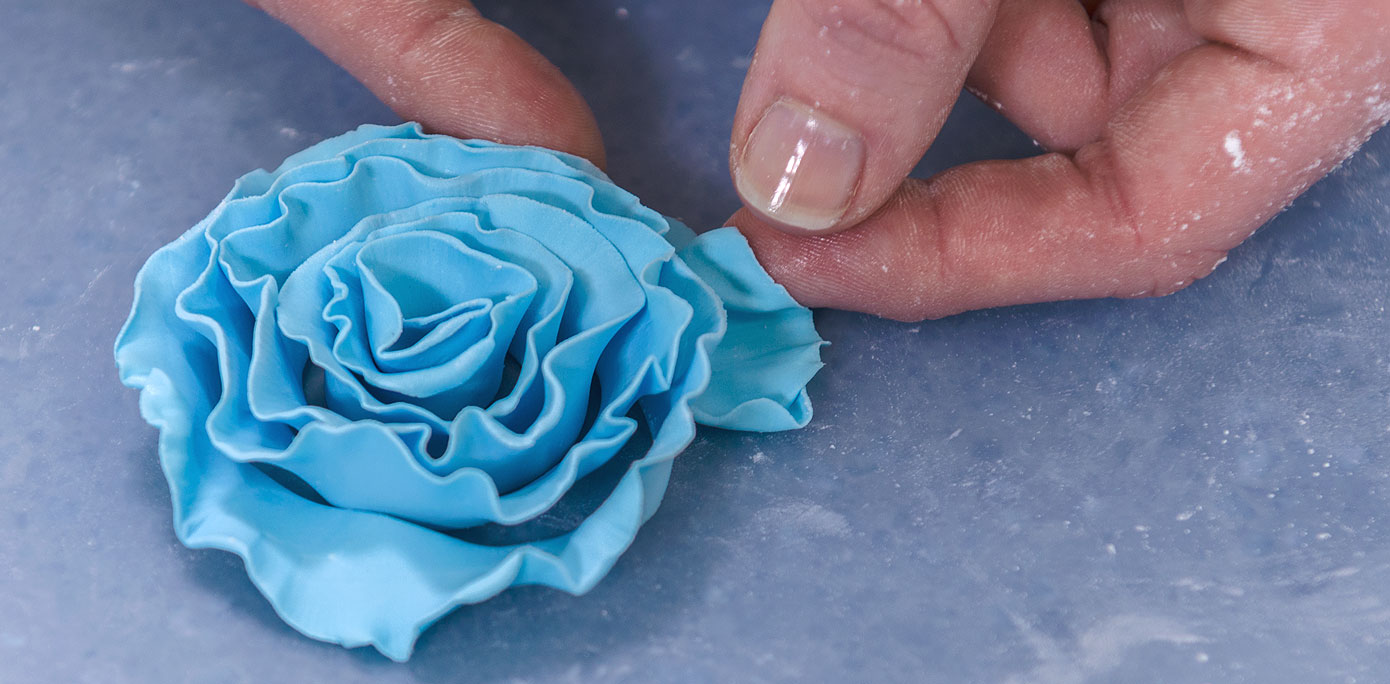
A fondant rose edible cake decoration

Fondant, also known as sugar paste or ready-roll icing, is a soft, opaque paste made of sugar, water, gelatin, vegetable fat or shortening and glycerol. Fondant is typically sold in a variety of colors when bought ready-made; it is easy to handle and provides a smooth, matte and non-stick cake cover.

Fondant must be rolled out with corn starch to avoid it sticking to any surfaces. Once smoothed out and thin enough, fondant can be molded into many different shapes, such as flowers or leaves, and may be cut into shapes and applied to a cake to build up decoration. Though primarily used to cover cakes, it is also used to create individual decorations to accompany cakes, consisting only of fondant with no cake inside.

As a relatively heavy form of decoration in comparison to traditional knife-spread frosting, extensive fondant application may weigh a cake down considerably, requiring a suitably sturdy cake base for support, often in the form of rods, especially on tiered fondant cakes. Fondant remains soft once sculpted, unlike other forms of icing, which may harden when exposed to air.

=== Royal icing ===
Royal icing is a sweet white icing made by whipping fresh egg whites, powdered egg whites, or meringue powder with powdered sugar. Royal icing produces well-defined icing edges especially when decorating cookies and is ideal for piping intricate writing, borders, scroll work and lacework on cakes. It dries very hard and preserves indefinitely if stored in a cool or dry place, but is susceptible to soften and wilt in high humidity.

=== Marzipan ===
Marzipan, a sweet almond paste, is often used for modeling cake decorations and sometimes used as a cake cover, much like fondant. It is generally made from ground almonds, sugar and honey. Since marzipan has almonds it is not commonly used due to allergen risk. However, it is more commonly used as a confection in candy and chocolate.

Some marzipan variations include egg whites to bind the mixture, and others use corn syrup. How marzipan is made varies by country. It is commonly used to make fruit shapes and flowers to decorate cakes.

=== Gum paste ===
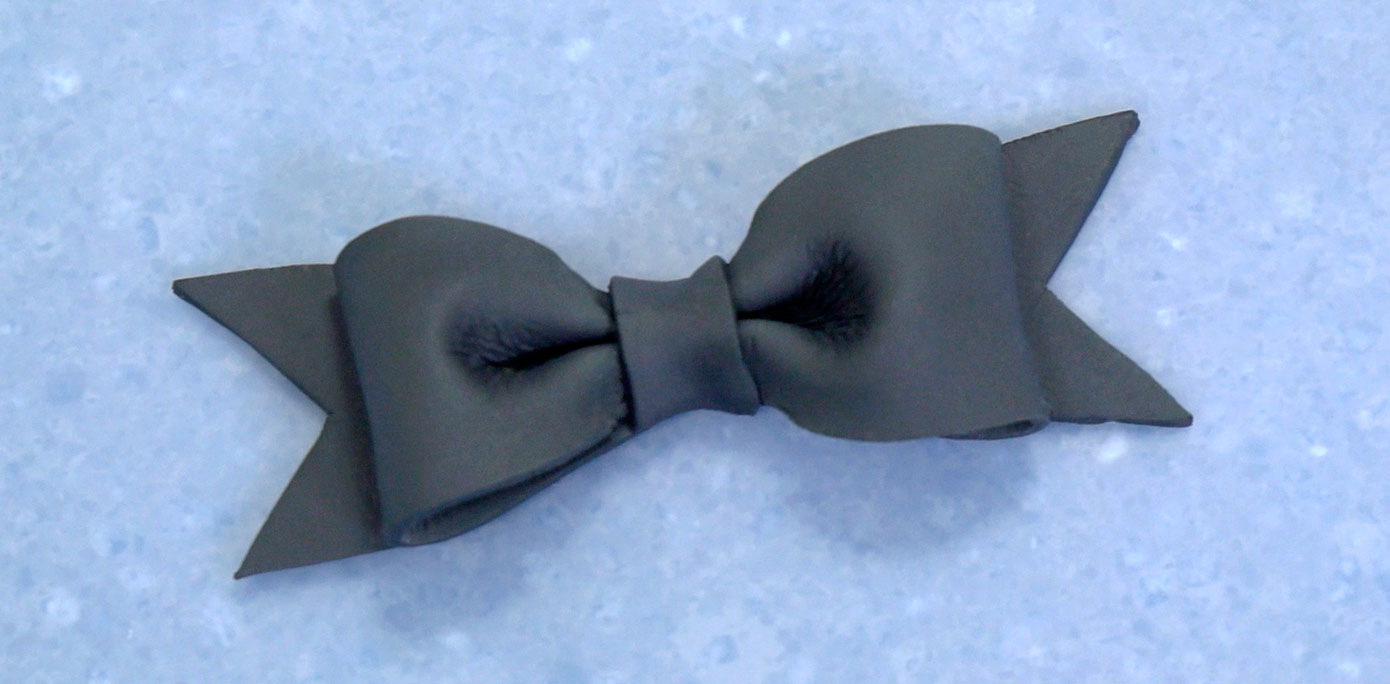
A bow made from gum paste

Gum paste, also known as florist paste, is an edible, brittle material that dries quickly and can be sculpted to make cake decorations such as flowers or molded designs. It is similar to fondant but it dries harder and faster making it quicker to work with.

It is made from sugar, egg whites and a hardening agent like tylose powder or gum tragacanth.

=== Modeling chocolate ===
Modeling chocolate is a chocolate paste made by melting chocolate and combining it with corn syrup, glucose syrup or golden syrup. The chocolate is formed into a variety of shapes and structures that cannot be easily accomplished with other softer edible materials such as buttercream frosting, marzipan or|fondant. Modeling chocolate can be made from white, dark, semi-sweet or milk chocolate. Often stacked on or around the cake for a decorative finish.

=== Edible ink printing ===
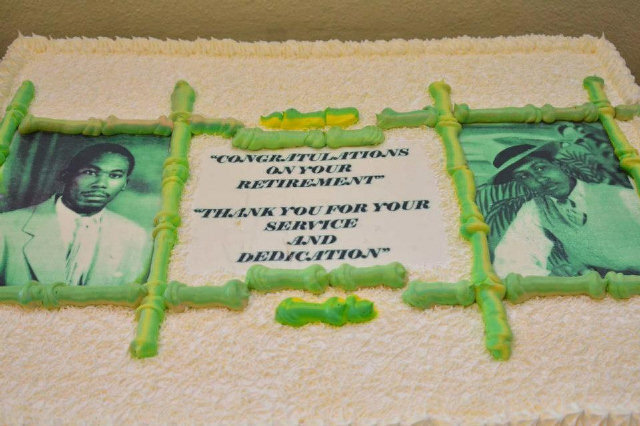
Edible ink can be used to print pictures and text onto wafer paper.

Edible ink printing is also used in decorating cakes. After breakthroughs in nontoxic inks and printing materials in the early 1990s, it became possible to print images and photographs onto edible sheets for use on cakes. The process uses pre-printed images printed with edible food colors, which are then applied to various confectionery products such as cookies, cakes or pastries. Designs made with edible ink can be created with a specialty printer, which transfers an image onto a thin, edible paper, made of starches and sugars. Originally introduced as a specialty service provided by bakeries, this technology can now be used by home consumers using the specialized paper, ink and printers. Modern day use of edible ink printing is mainly for themed cakes, and is often used to display a real face onto the cake's surface.

=== Buttercream icing ===
Buttercream is the most common, present day form of decoration. Decorators use it for a thick, creamy outcome and it is widely used as a filling when stacking cake. It is made by whipping soft butter and adding in cups of powdered sugar, and it is often combined with a sweet vanilla and cream form.

=== Airbrushing ===
Airbrushing in cake decorating is a technique used to apply color in a smooth and even layer using an airbrush. The tool is used with edible food coloring. This method allows for a gradient technique and stencil design. It is commonly used in a professional setting due to its precision and efficiency.

== Techniques ==
Decorating a cake usually involves covering it with some form of icing and then using decorative sugar, candy, chocolate, or icing decorations to embellish the cake. However, it can be as simple as sprinkling a fine coat of icing sugar or drizzling a glossy blanket of glaze over the top of a cake like a mirror cake style that uses a glaze of gelatin, sugar, water and sometimes chocolate. A cake turntable (or rotating tray) can be used to facilitate the process.

Icing decorations can be made by either piping icing flowers and decorative borders or by molding sugar paste, fondant or marzipan flowers and figures. An embossing mat is a tool for cake decoration that creates embossed effects on the top of cakes, cupcakes or similar items. The user presses the mat down into cake dough or icing and the pattern embossed in the mat is transferred to the item. Embossing mats are often made of silicone rubber or similar flexible polymers.

Many icing designs can be made by piping tips; these come in many shapes and sizes. Tutorials are often made to model the different designs created by different piping tips. For example, a tip learned through years of cake decorating, was to put the icing in the freezer just enough to stiffen it up to create roses. Decorating, creating flowers, balloons, writing 'happy birthday' or any special message, comes with practice and creativity.

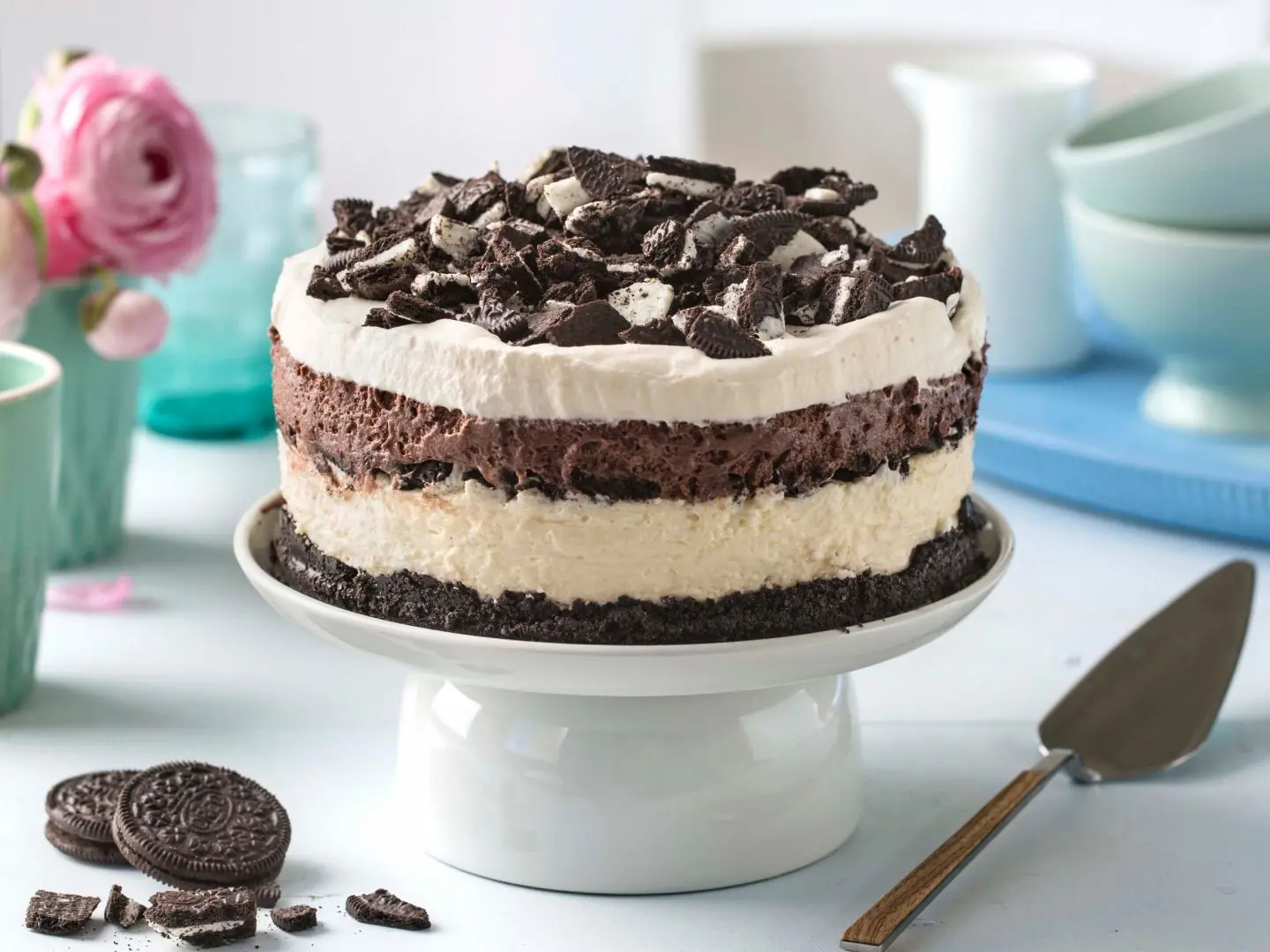
A chocolate naked cake (no frosting on the sides)

"Naked cakes" became a popular trend, most notably during 2020. In this decorating style, fillings are used between the cake layers but the outside is left unfrosted or sparsely frosted, with much of the cake itself still visible between and through the frosted areas. Naked cakes are often decorated with icing sugar or fresh flowers on top. They are often garnished with fresh fruit, sometimes in the layers. They were especially popular as new types of wedding and engagement cakes.

It may be necessary to secure cake layers in place to prevent sliding or falling, especially for large cakes with several layers. Various forms of wooden skewers or dowels and plastic straws are commonly used for this purpose.

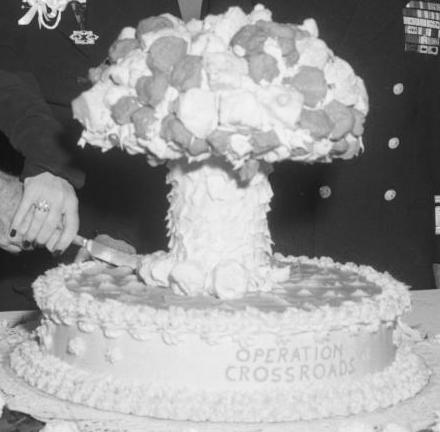
"Operation Crossroads" atomic bomb mushroom cloud cake, 1946

Large and complex structures can be made by cutting shapes out of cake and piecing them together (often secured together with many non-edible reinforcements). Pre-formed baking pans make it easy to create cakes in non-traditional shapes. Though useful for producing multiple cakes of the same general shape, they do not have the endless customizability of hand-cut building blocks. Fondant and marzipan structures can also be used to modify the overall shape of a cake.

== As an art ==
Cake decorating has become a unique edible art form, with examples ranging from simply decorated single-layer cakes, to complex, multi-layered three-dimensional creations with extensive edible decorations. Cake copyright may apply.

== In popular culture ==
- Food Network's Ace of Cakes features baker and former street-artist, Duff Goldman and his shop, Charm City Cakes.
- WE's Amazing Wedding Cakes is a television series featuring several cake decorating companies across America and focuses on the crafting and design of the cakes.
- Cake Wrecks is an entertainment photoblog featuring user-submitted images of "unintentionally silly, sad, creepy or inappropriate" cakes.
- TLC's Cake Boss features baker Buddy Valastro and his shop called Carlo's Bake Shop in Hoboken, New Jersey.
- Netflix's Nailed It! is a competition show in which amateur bakers attempt cake decorating.
- The Great British Bake Off is an amateur baking competition show which often features cake decorating.

== Gallery ==
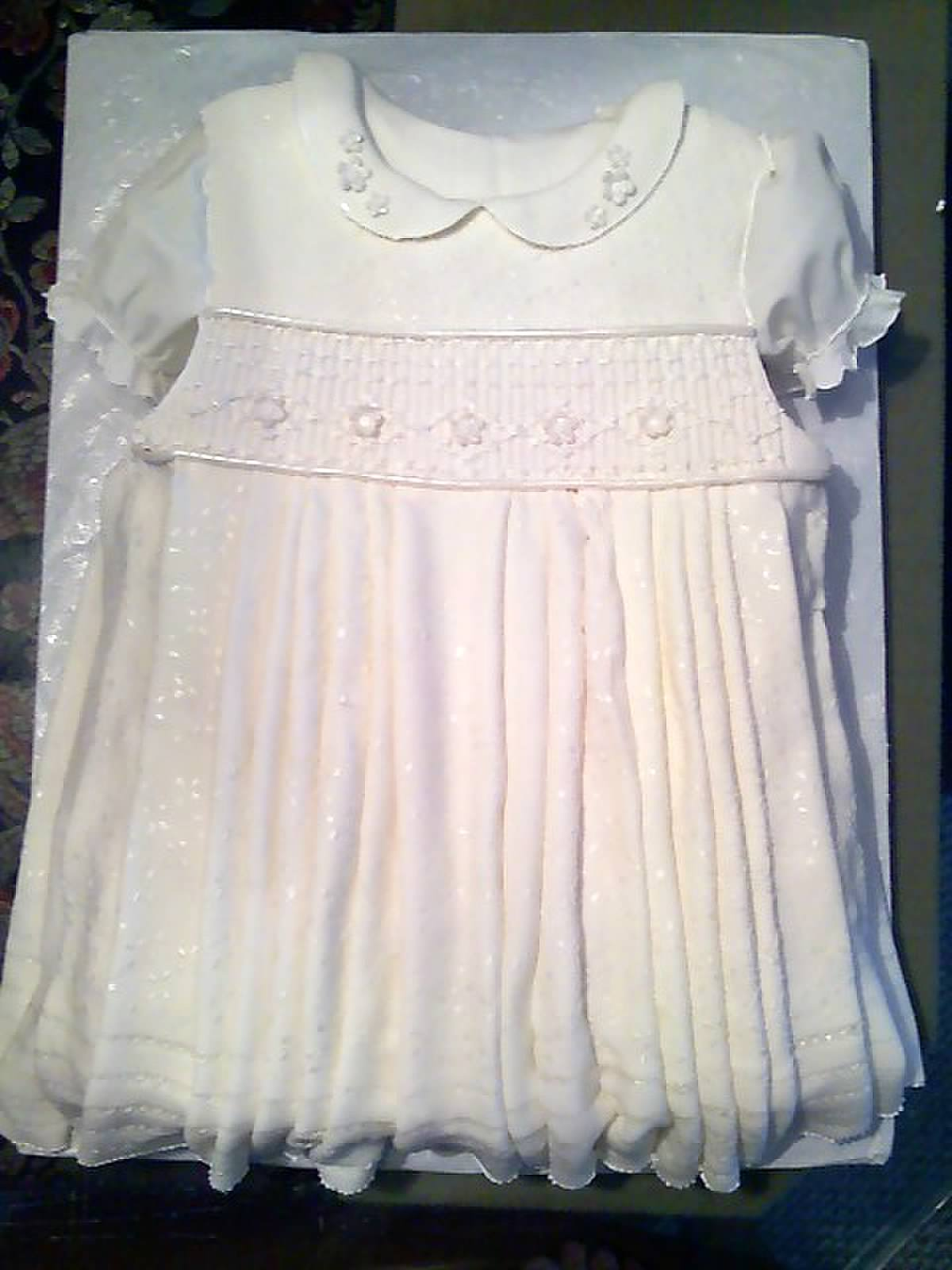
A cake decorated to resemble a child's dress

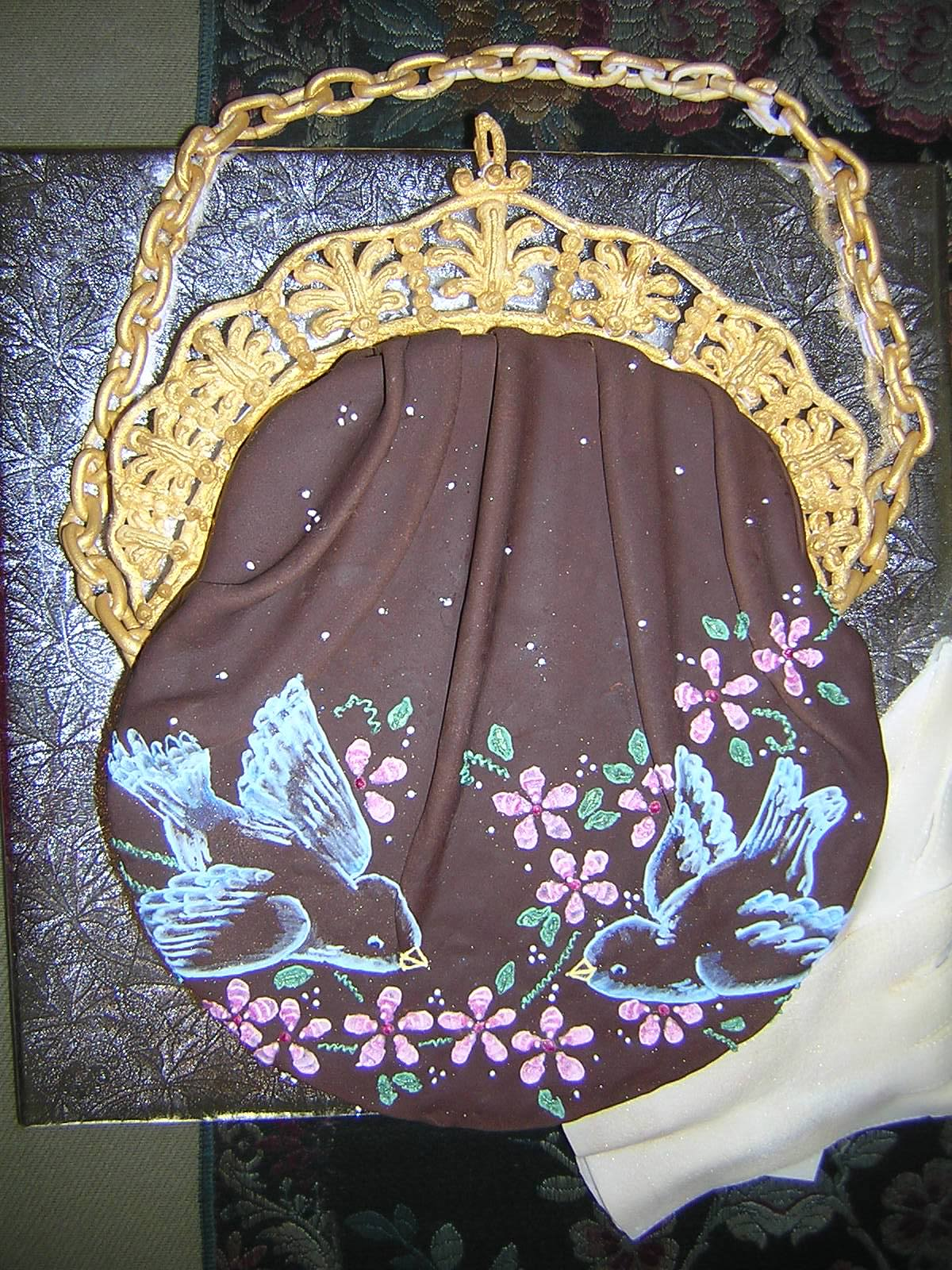
Lady's evening bag cake with edible frosting

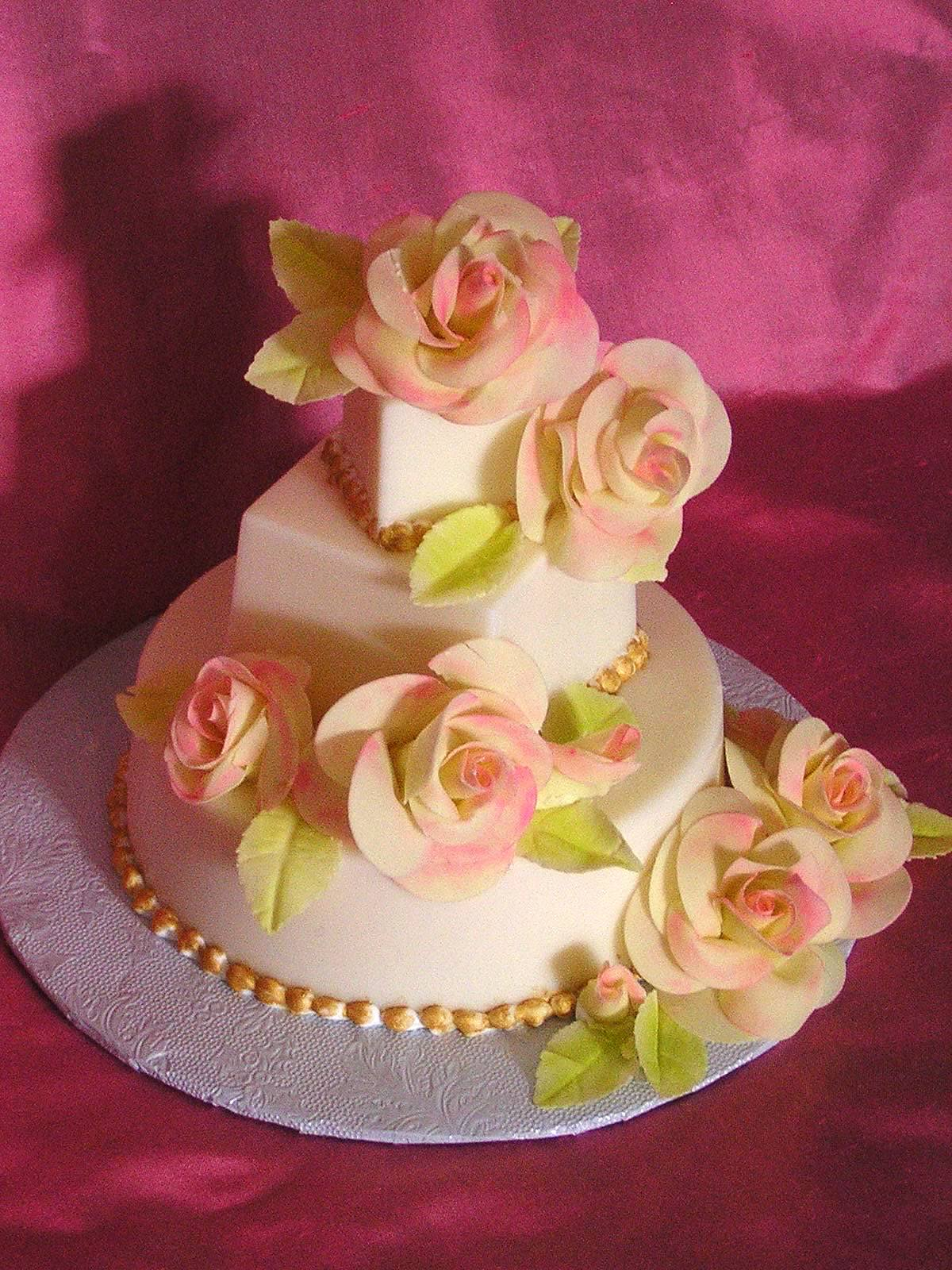
Cake with large cabbage roses

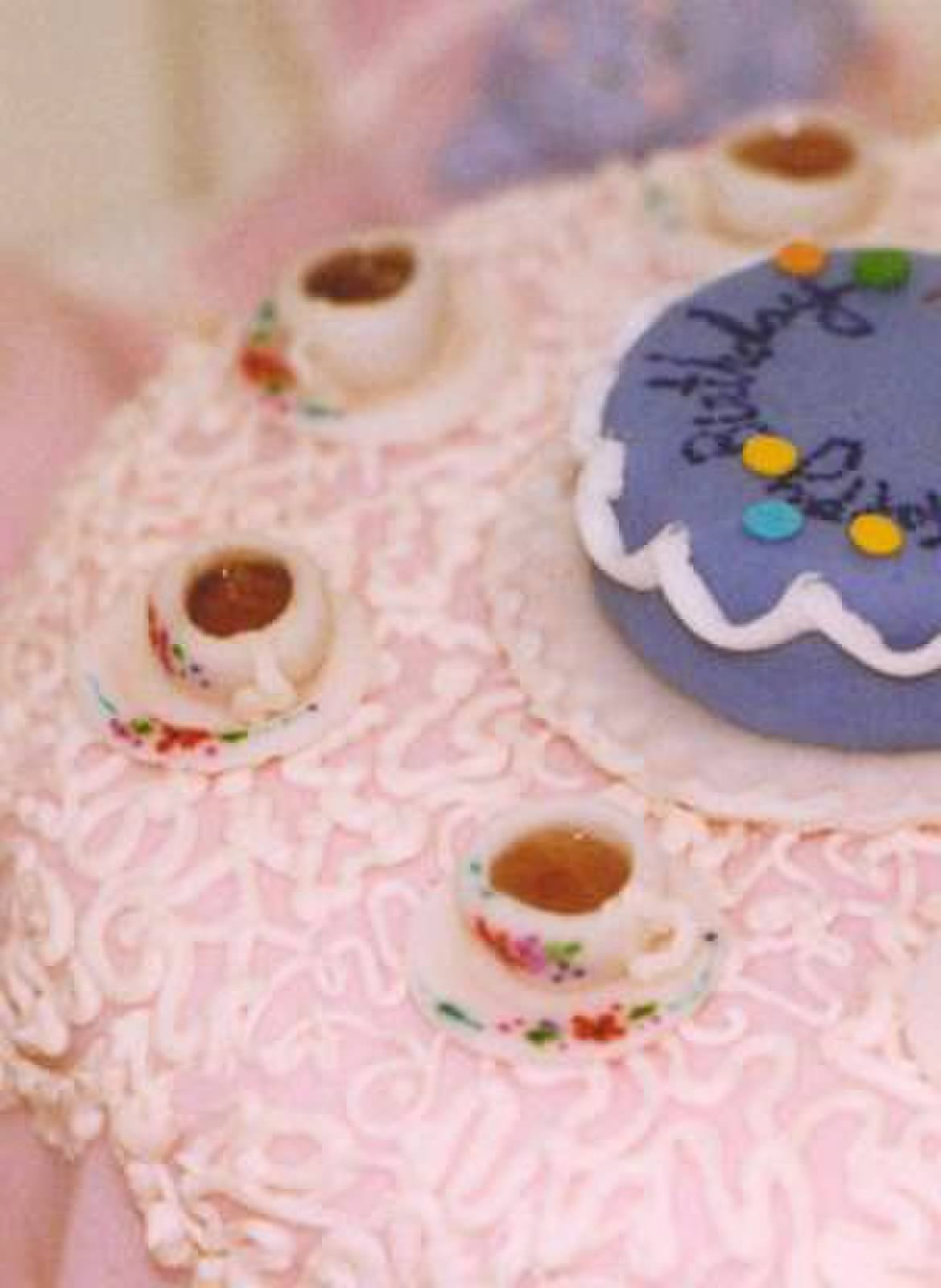
Detail of hand-painted miniature cups in sugar with sugar lace tablecloth

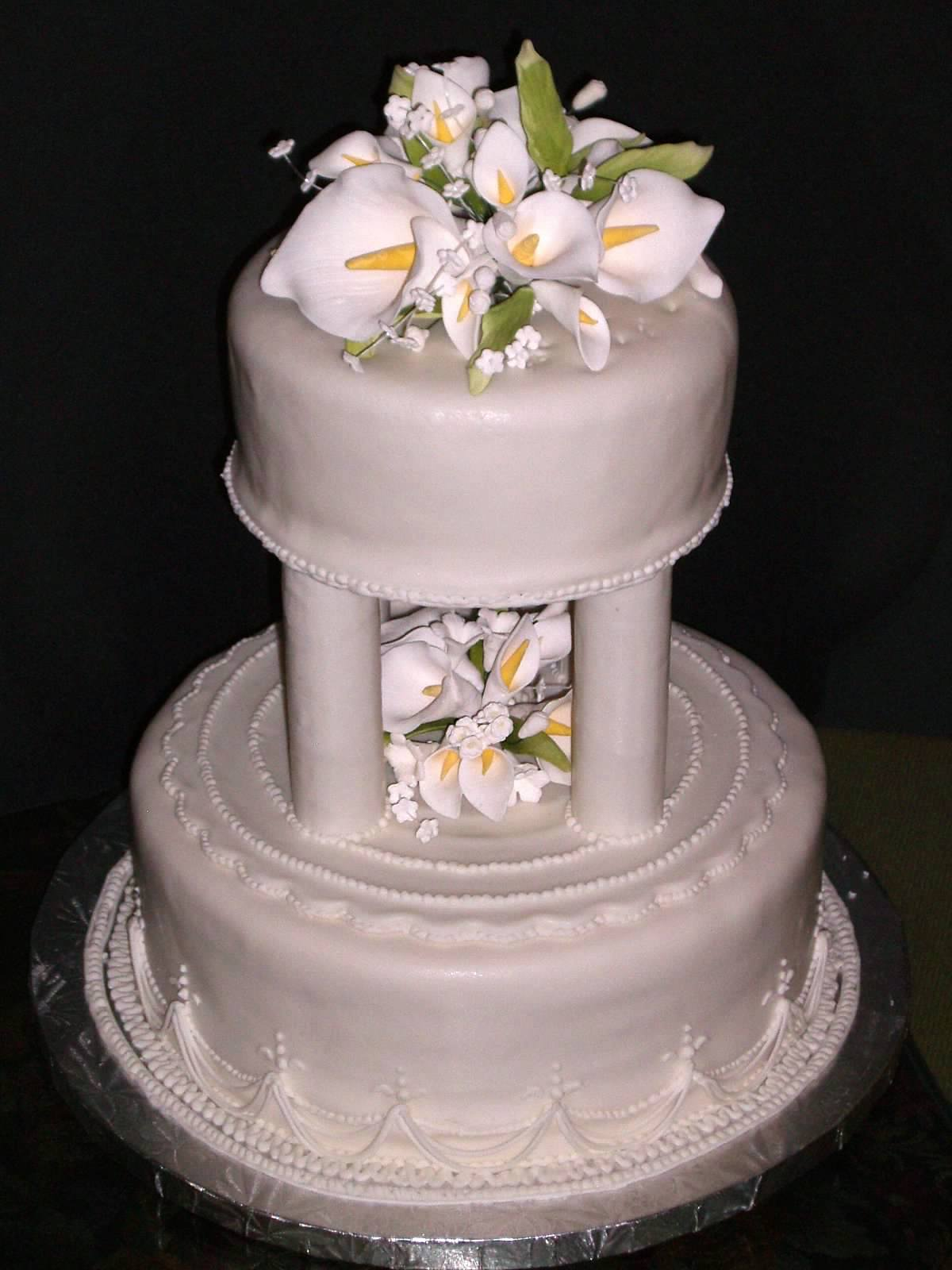
Tiered wedding cake with calla lilies

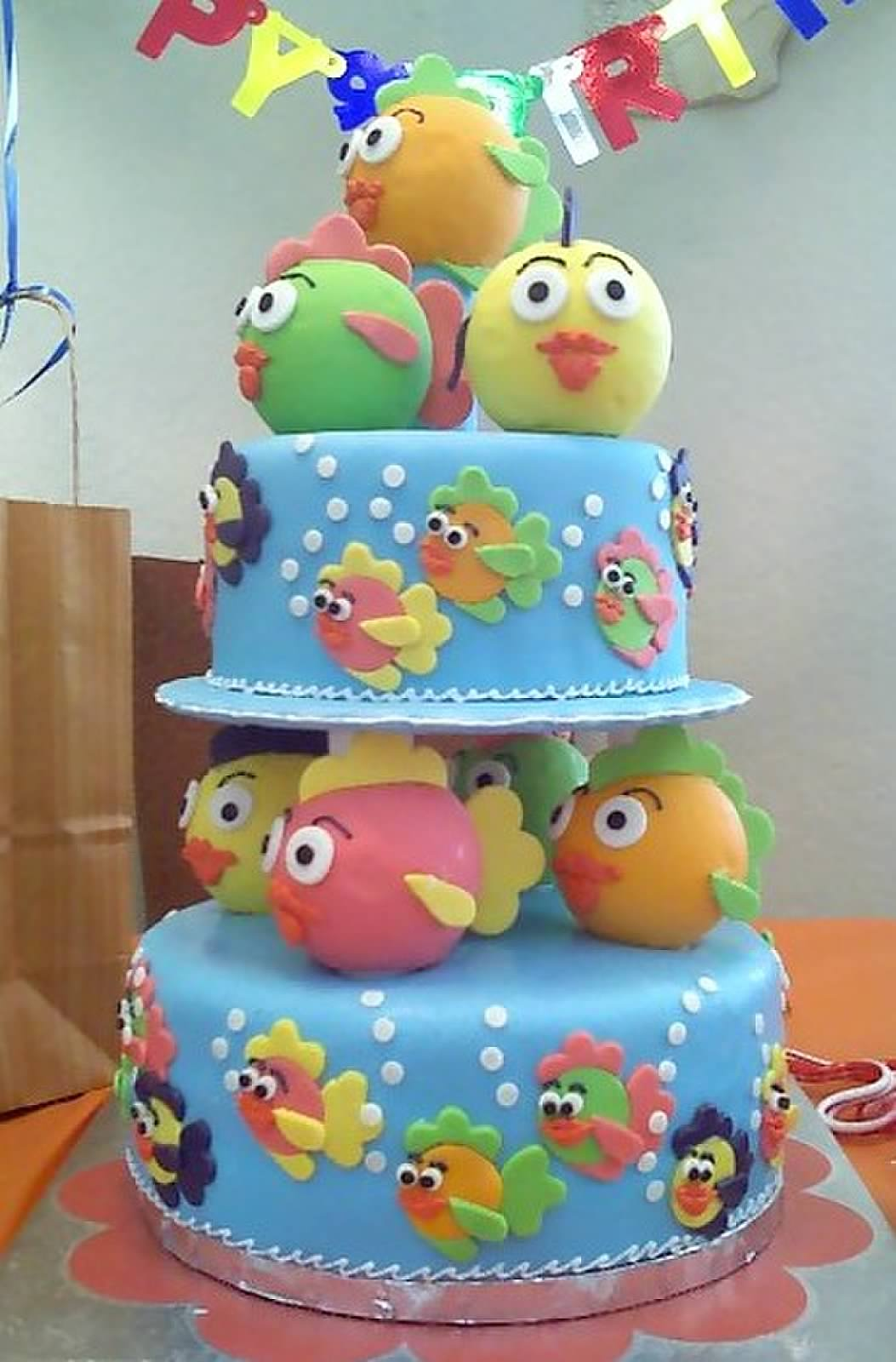
Birthday cake for one-year-old

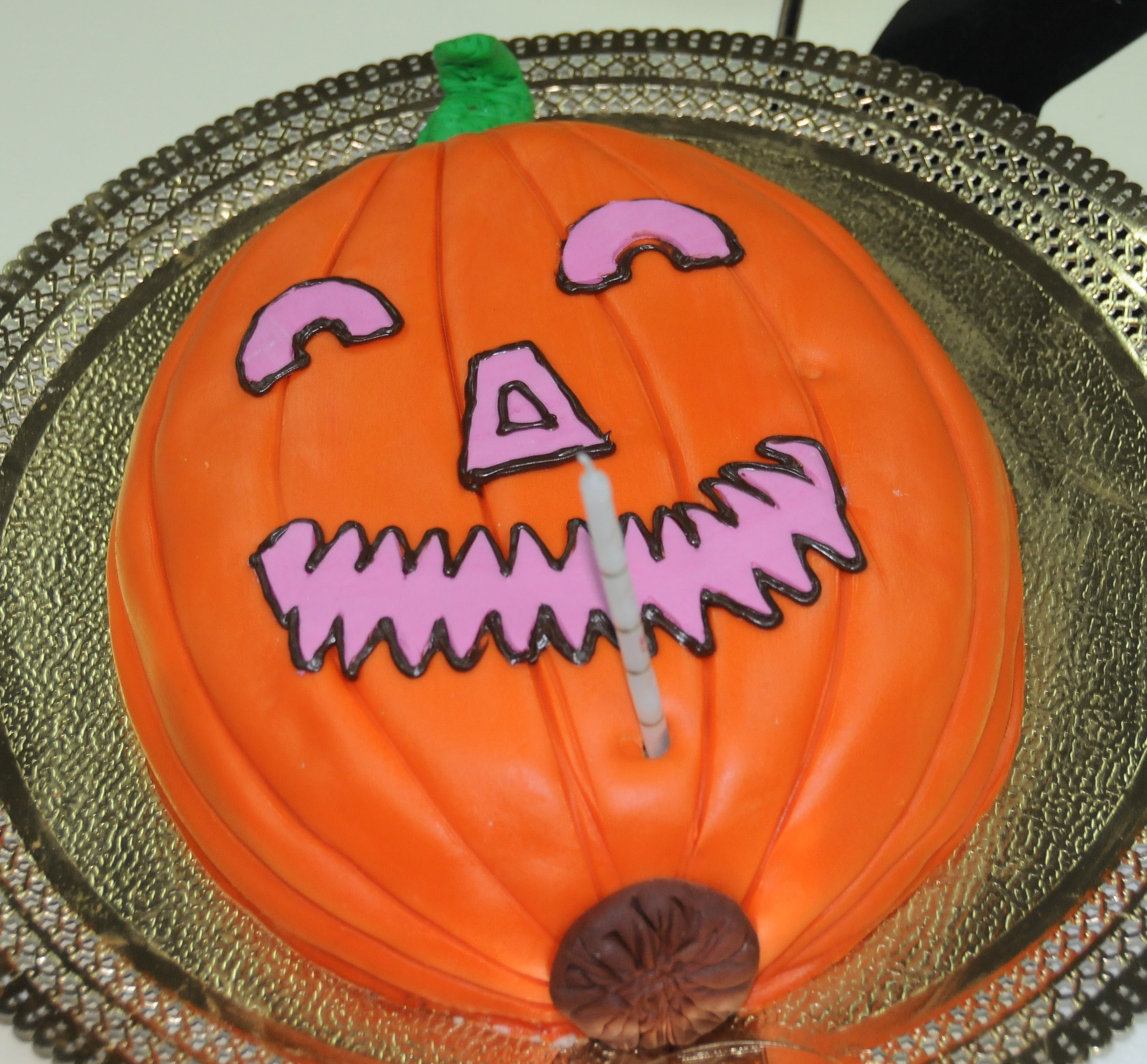
A Halloween cake

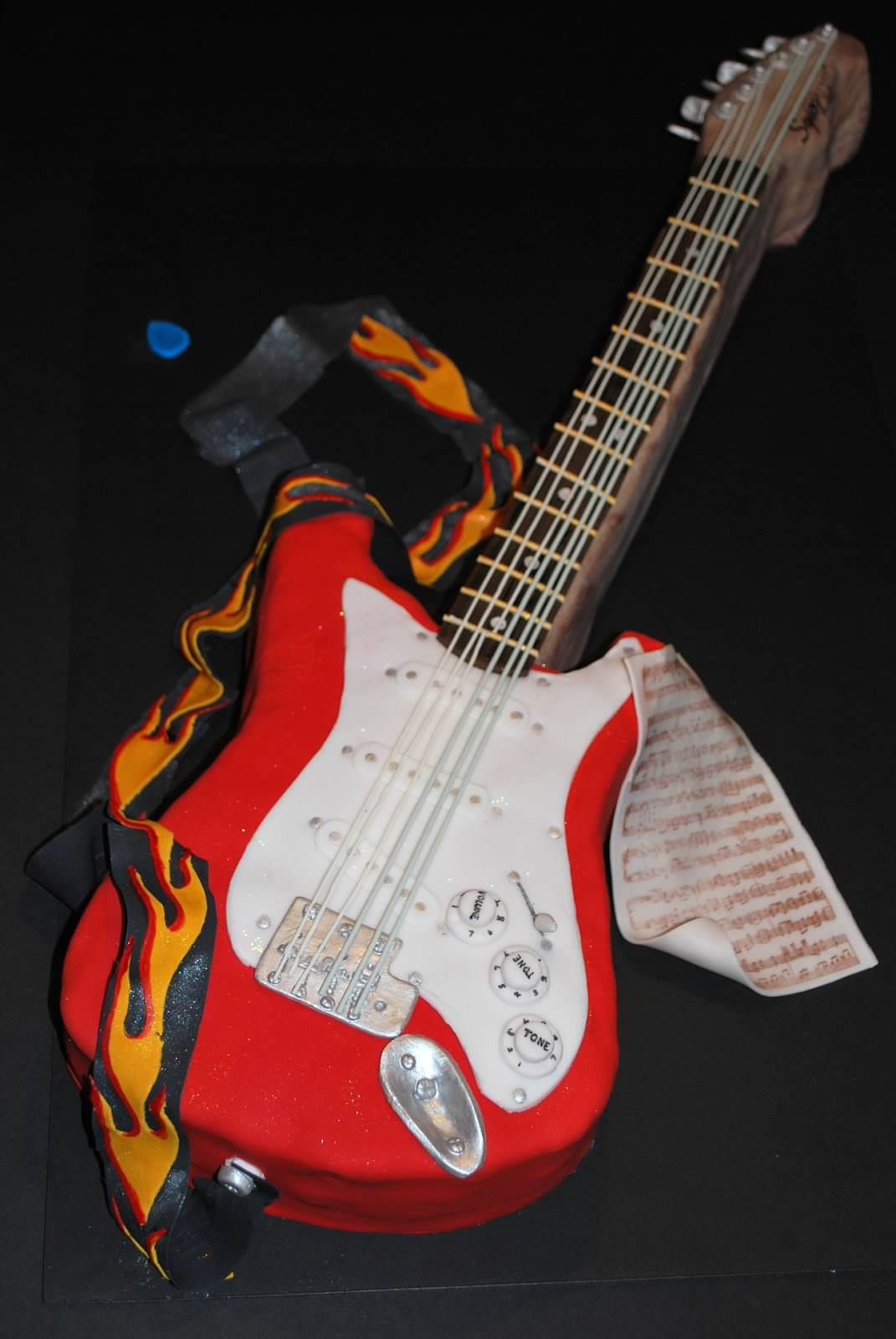
Guitar cake with edible frosting

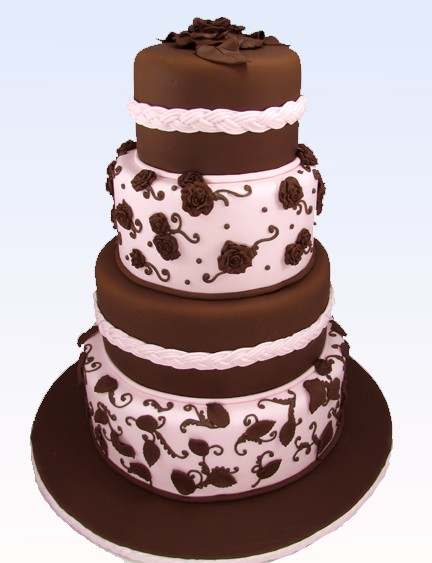
Chocolate cake decorated with foliage and chocolate roses

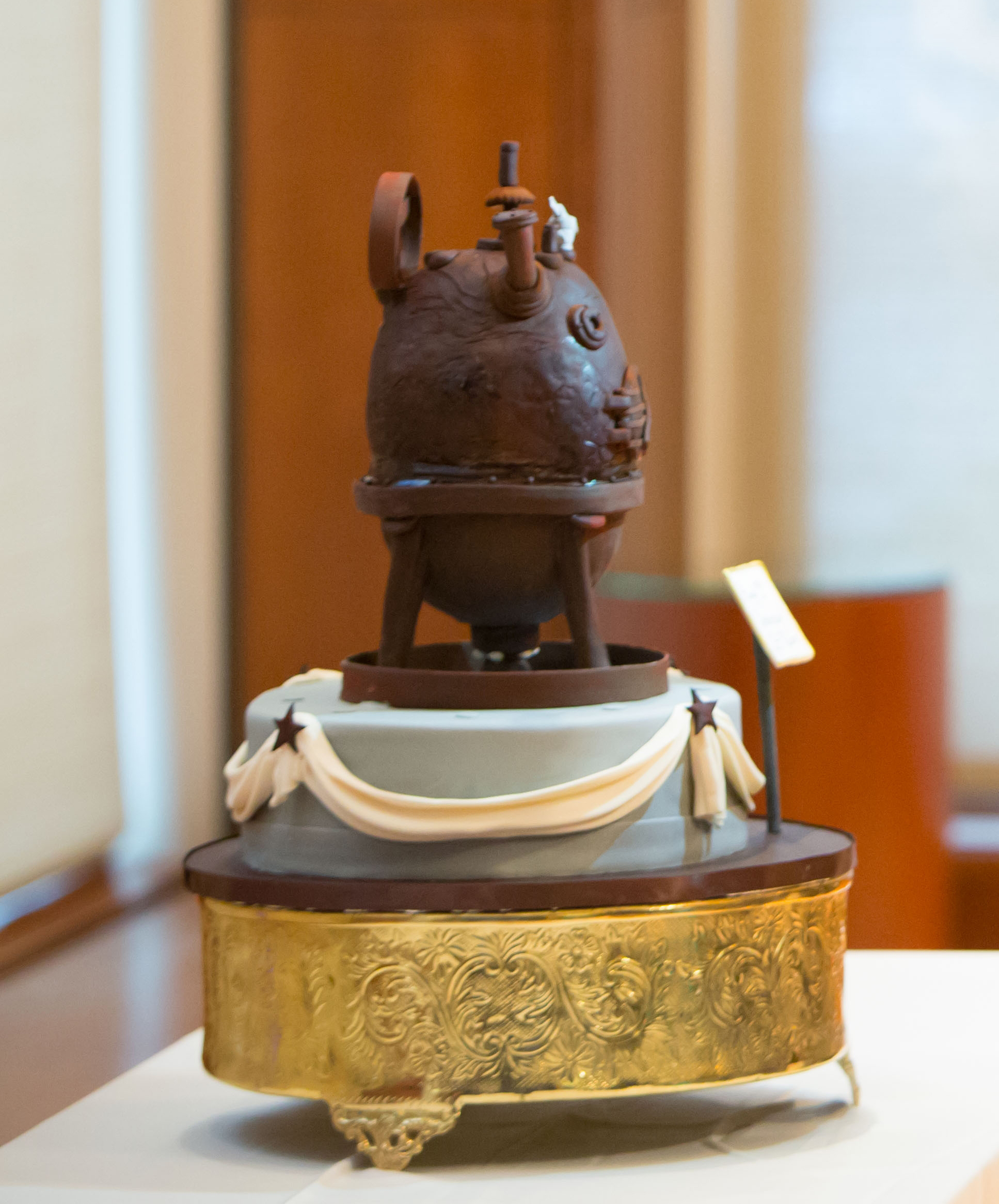
Science cake with Bakelite oven chocolate cake top

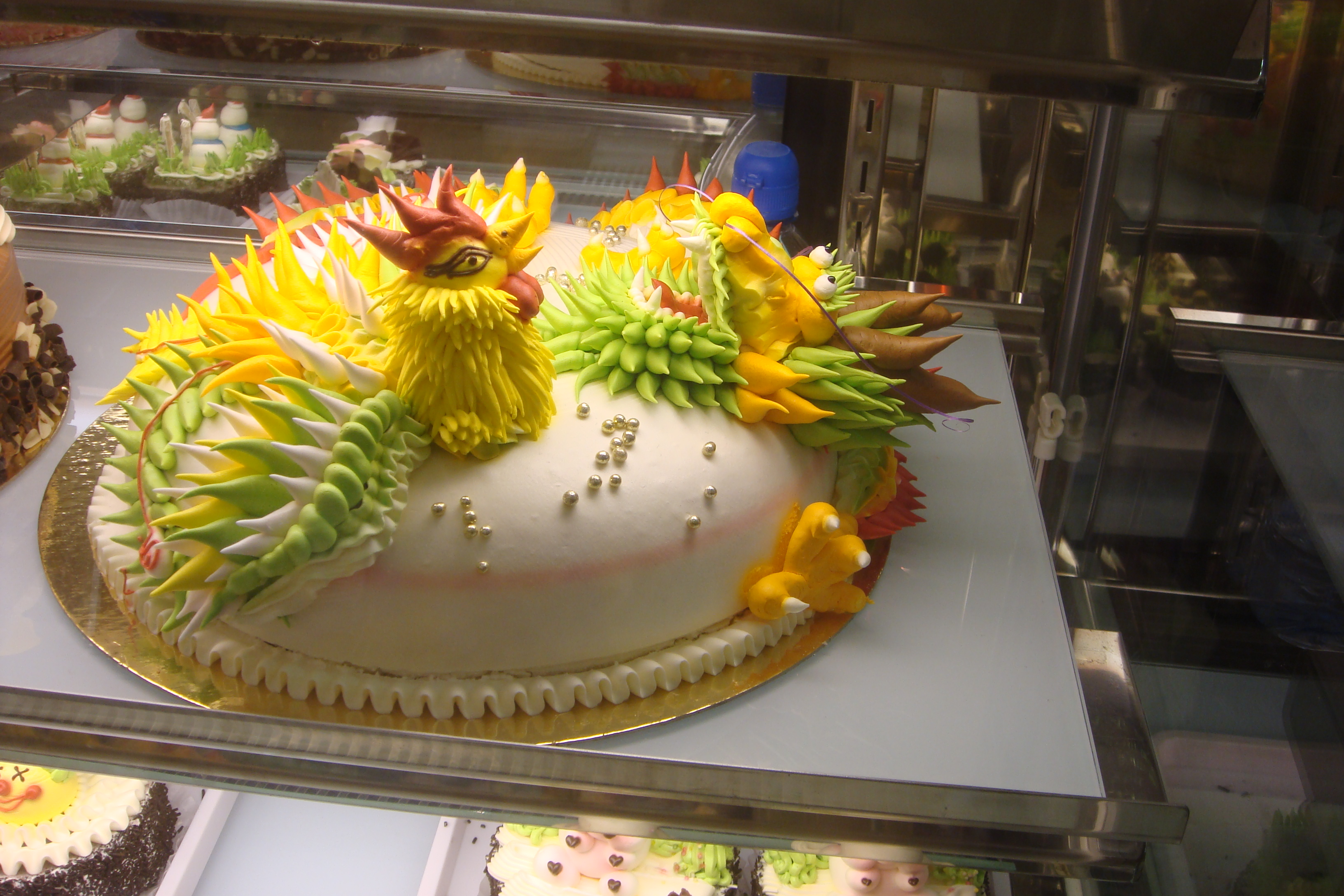
Rooster cake in Chinatown, London, for Chinese New Year celebrations

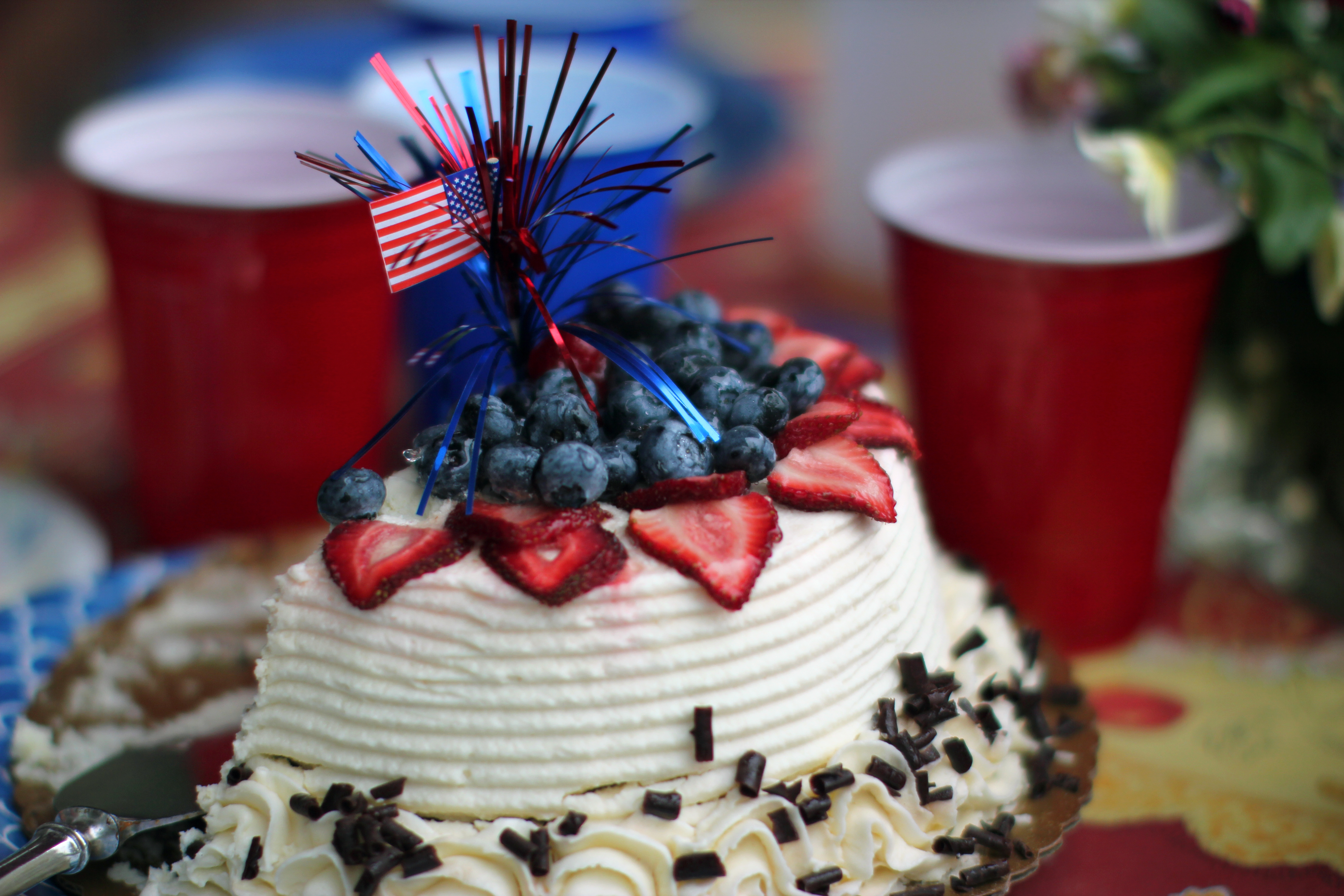
A Fourth of July cake decorated in red, white and blue

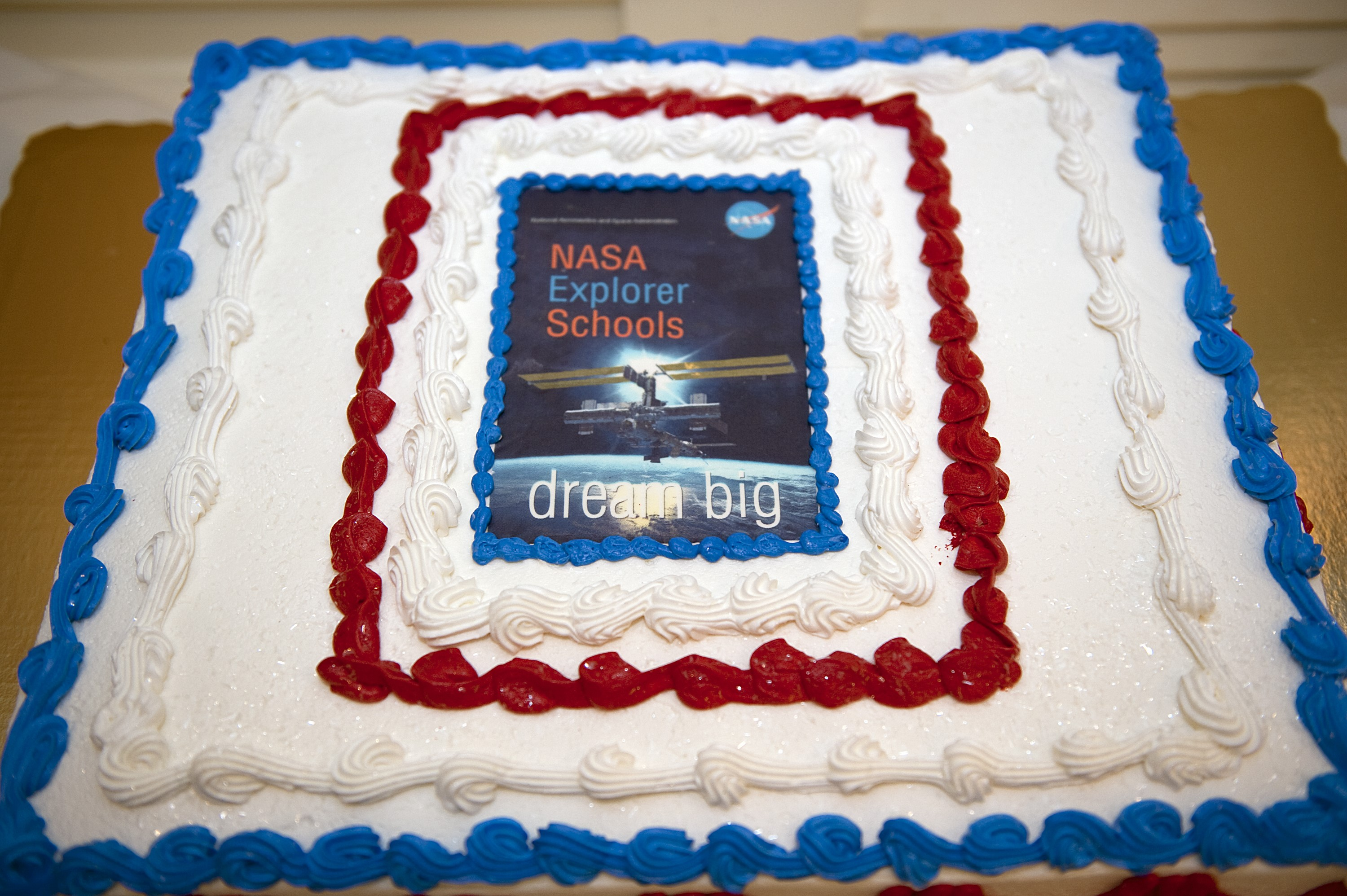
An International Space Station-themed NASA slab cake for students at Kennedy Space Center

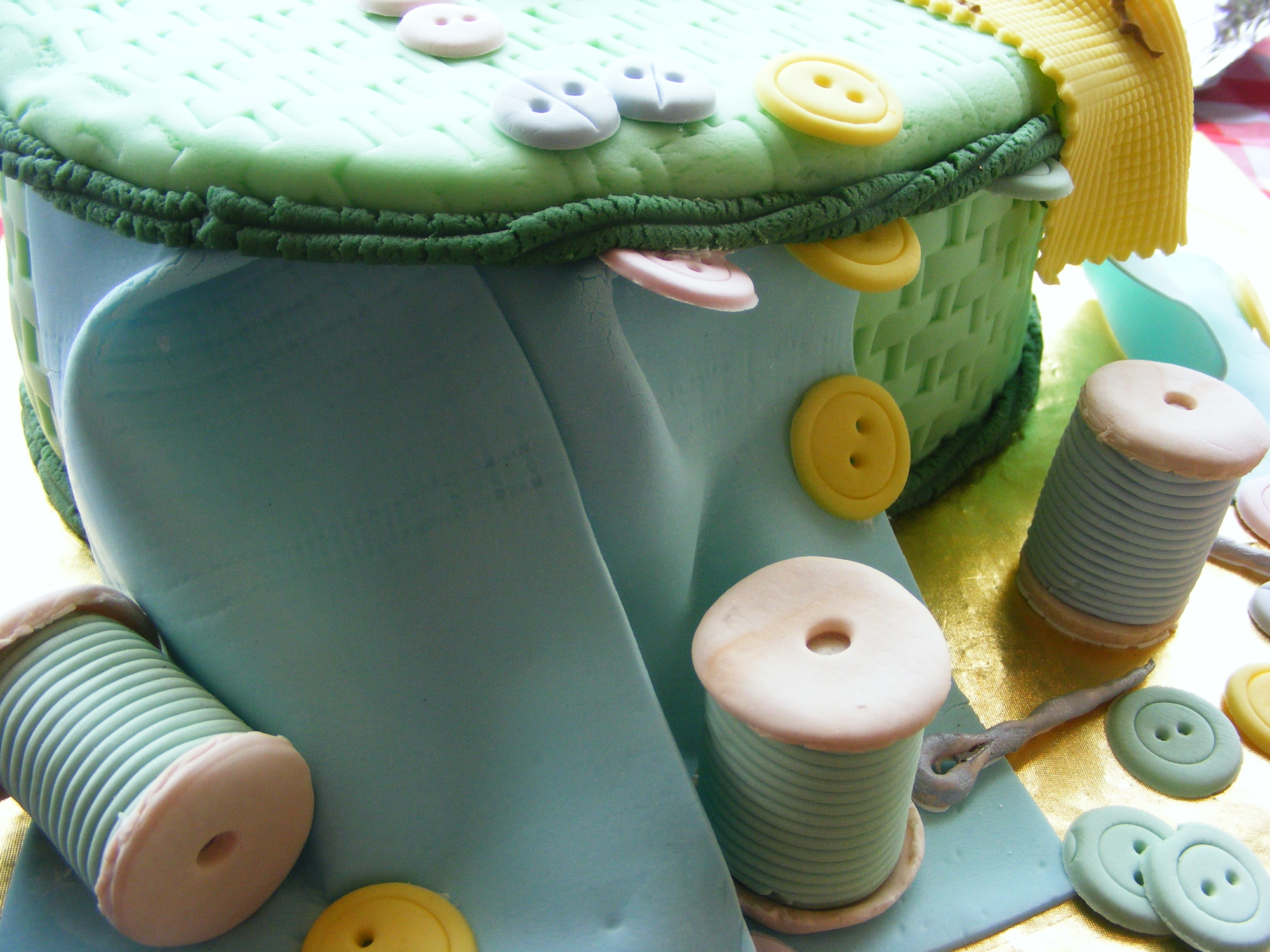
A fondant-covered cake depicting a sewing kit

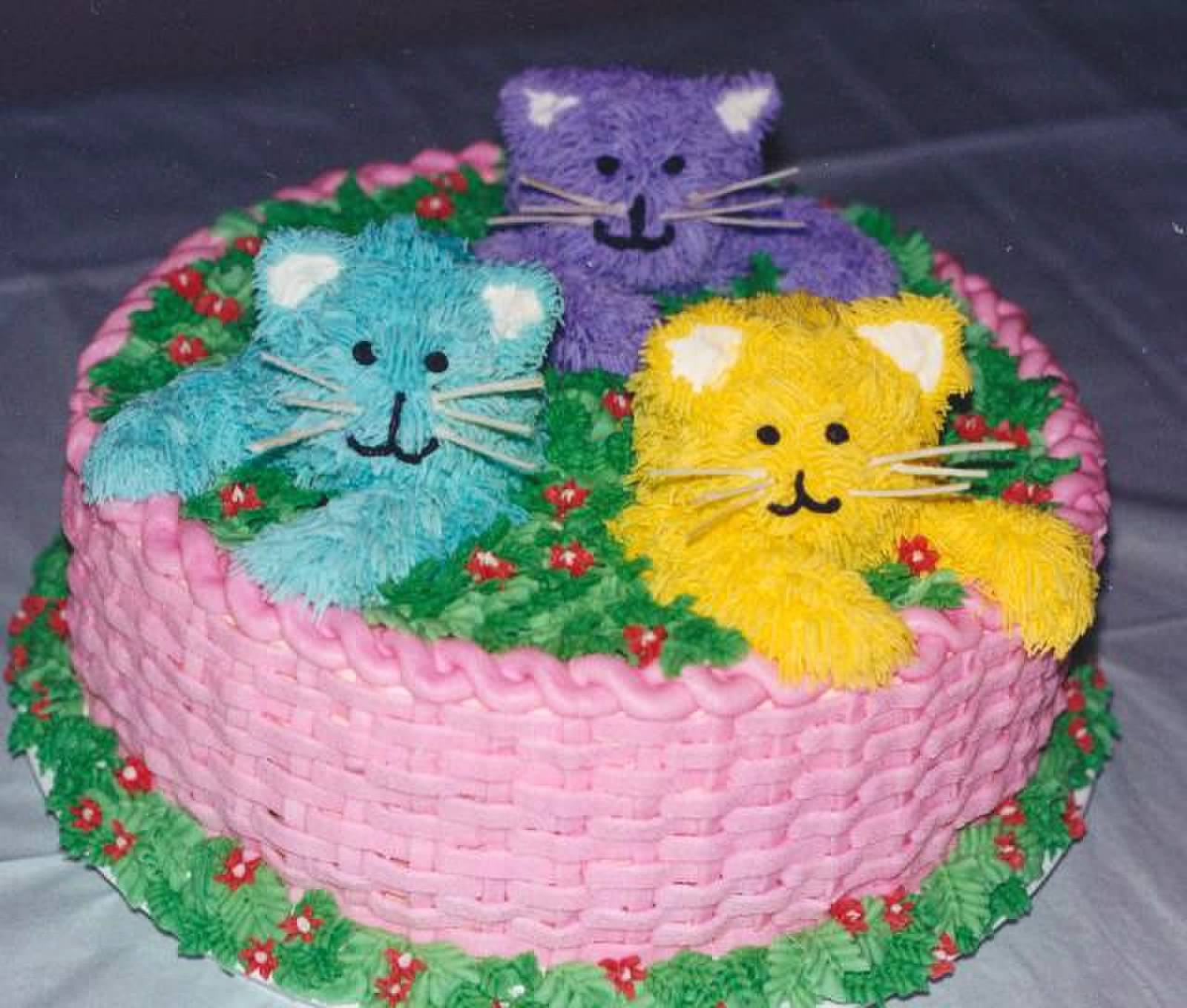
Basket of kittens cake

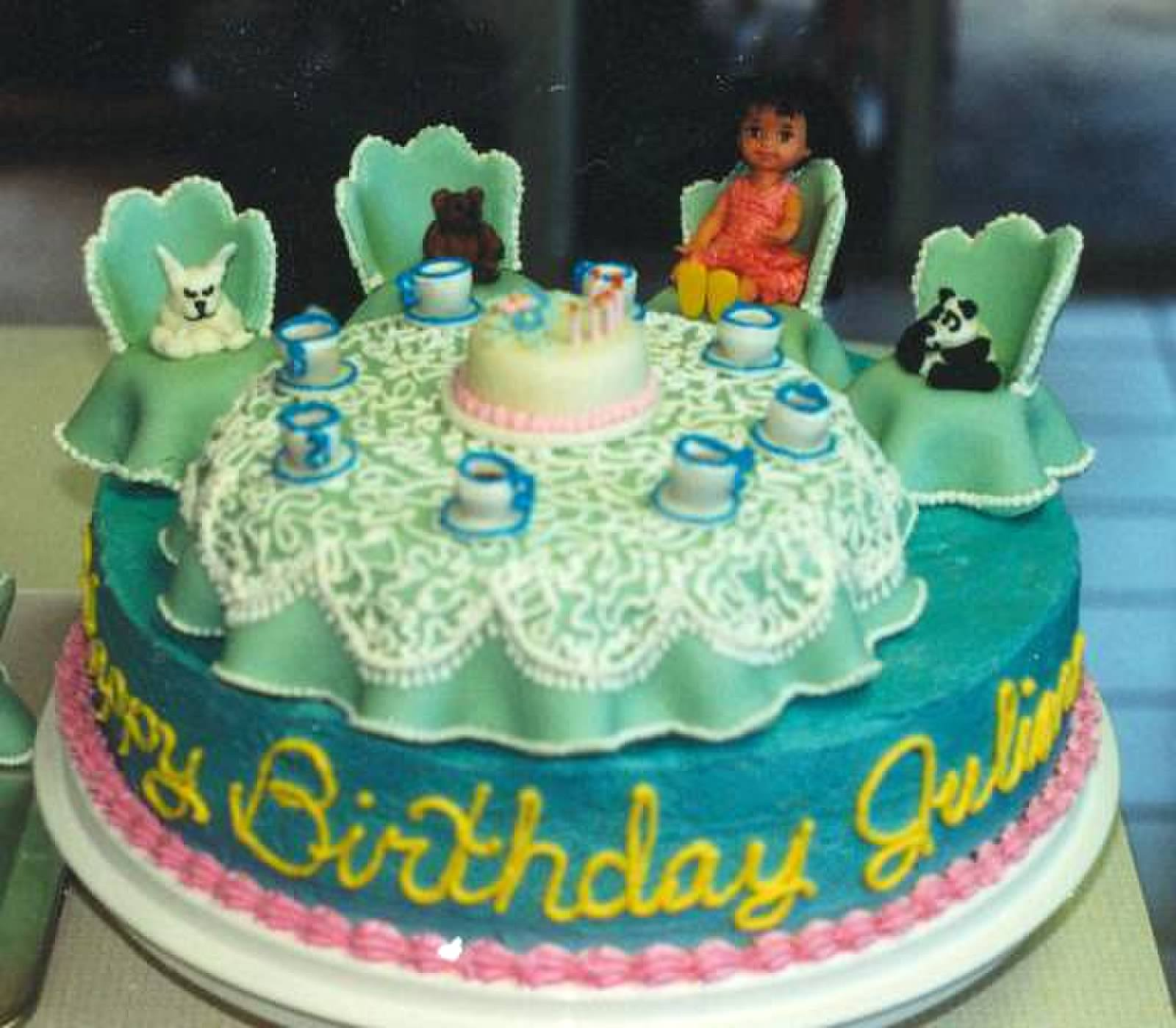
Birthday party birthday cake

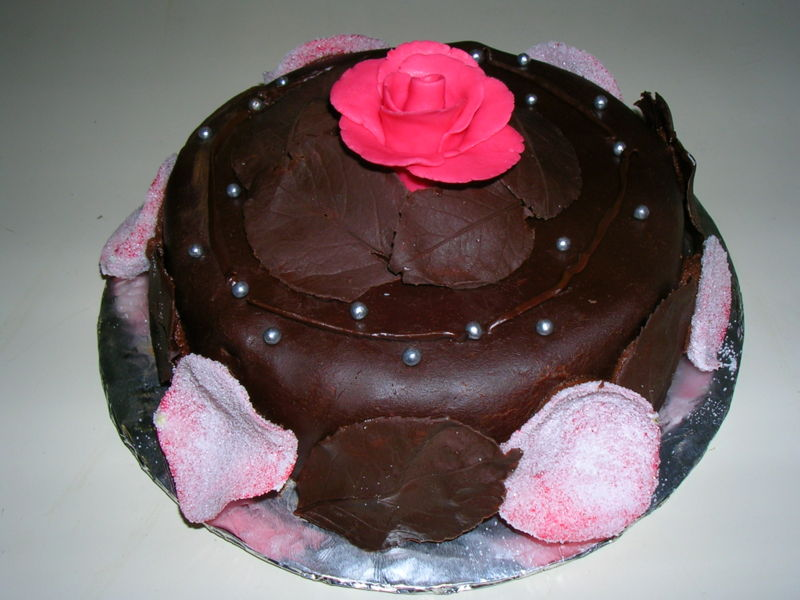
Chocolate cake with roses

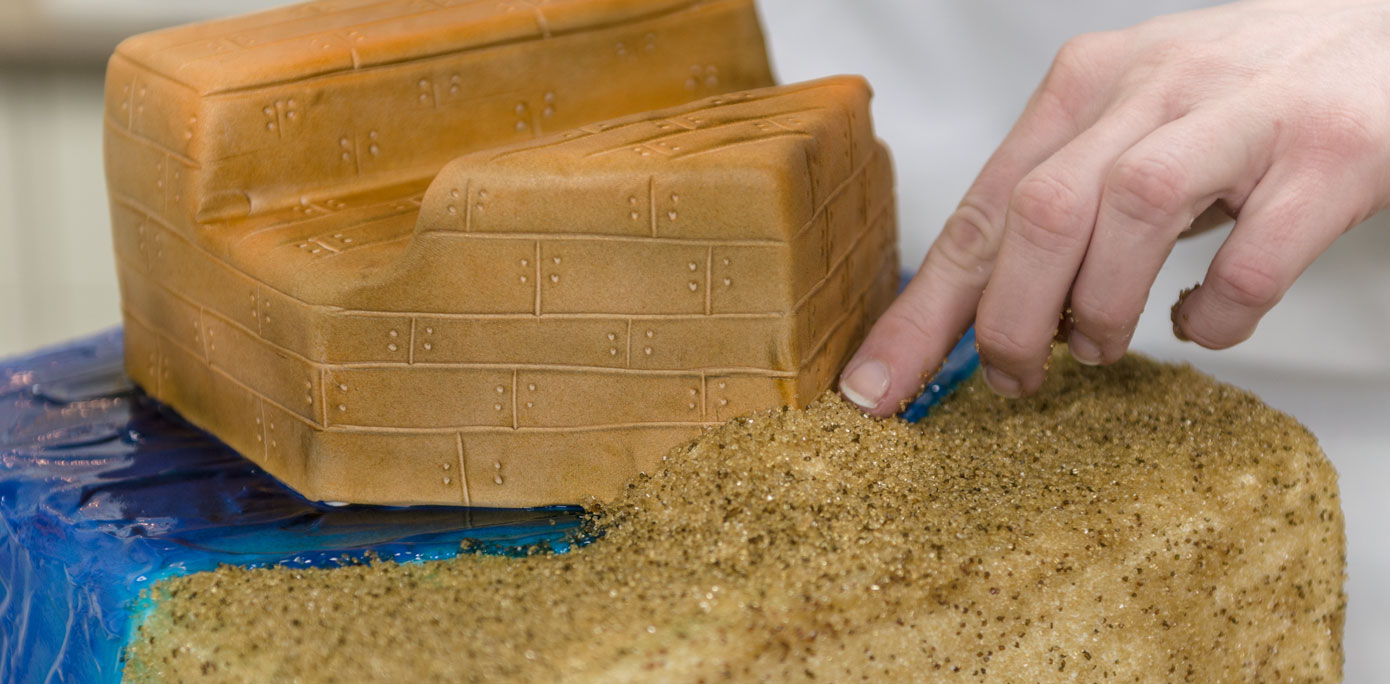
Advanced cake decorating techniques

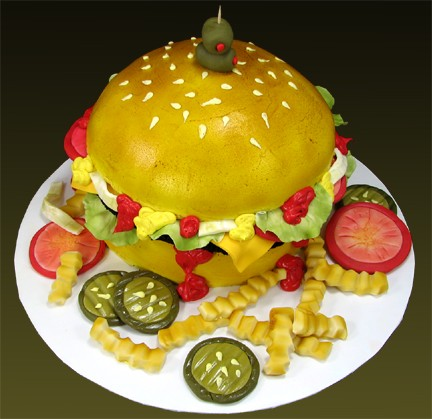
A cake sculpted to look like a cheeseburger with fries

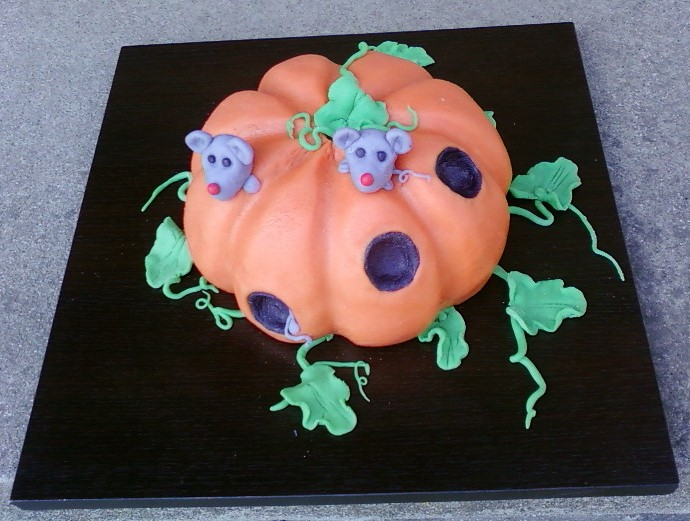
A cake decorated to look like a pumpkin with mice living in it

== See also ==
- Bakery
- Couverture chocolate
- Dessert sauce
- Huamo
- Pastry chef
- Pâtisserie
- Food presentation
- Food photography
- Sprinkles
- Sugar substitute
- Wedding cake
- Cake
