= Huamo =

Decorated mantou

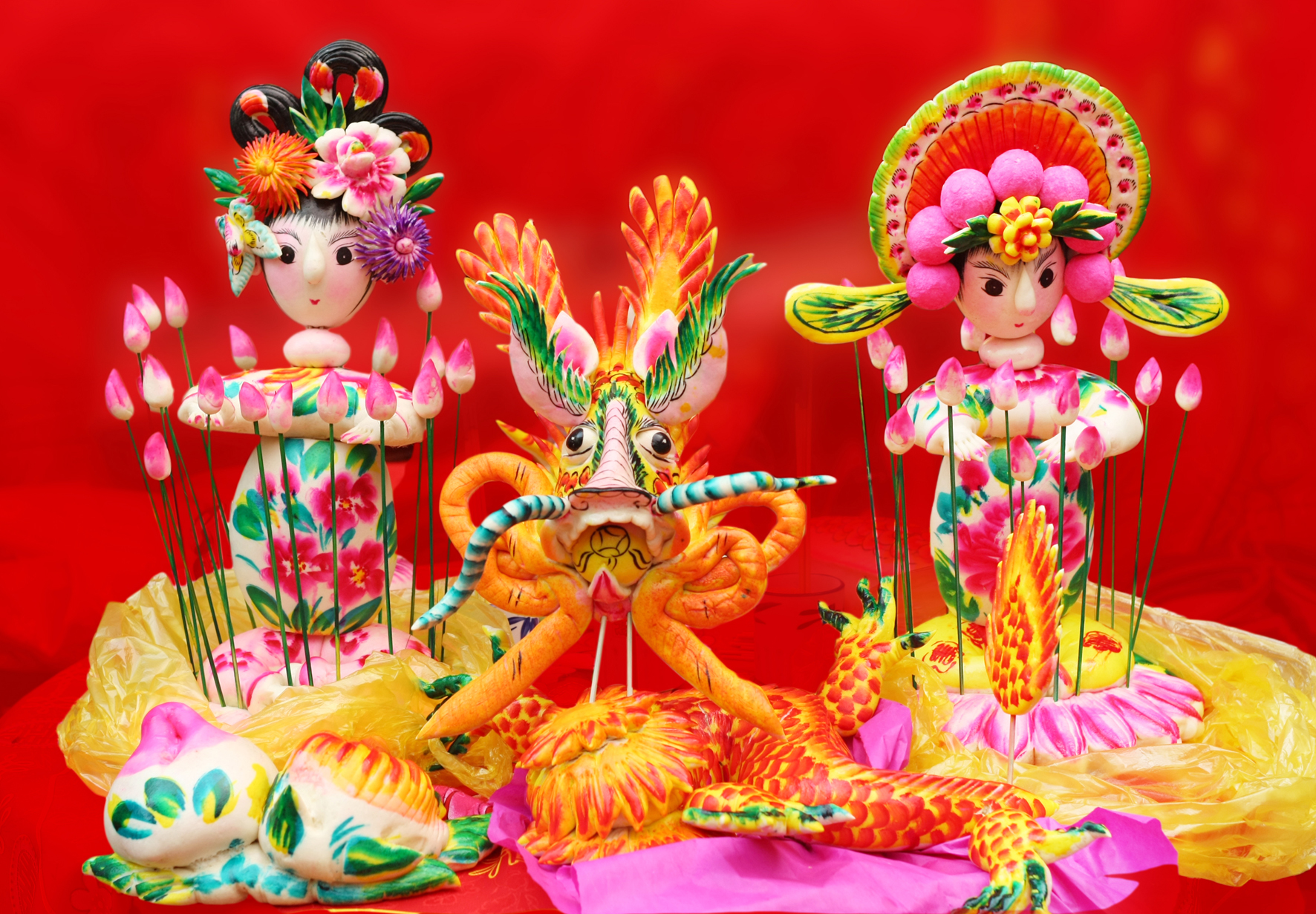
Wedding huamo, featuring a bridal couple

Huamo (simplified Chinese: 花馍; traditional Chinese: 花饃; pinyin: huāmó) is a Chinese method of decorating specially shaped mantou. Huamo are a feature of the folk art of Shanxi and are often prepared for festivals such as Qingming. Wenxi County in Shanxi is particularly renowned for its huamo. Many shapes such as fish, guanmao, birds and dragons are used.

== See also ==
- Cake decorating
