= Sugar paste =

Sweet edible dough

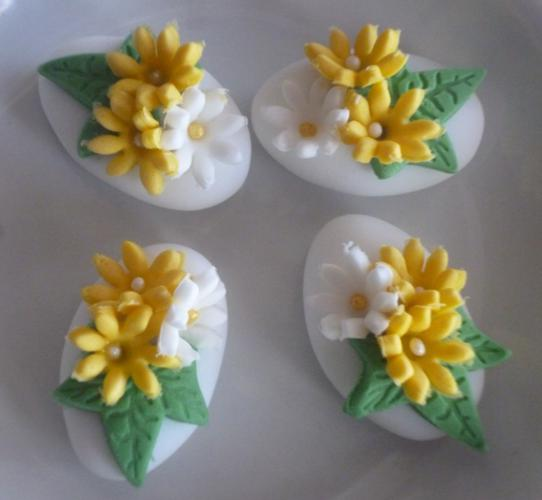
Sugar paste in the shape of flowers

Sugar paste icing is a sweet, edible sugar dough, typically made from sucrose and glucose. It is sometimes referred to as sugar gum or gum paste.

Sugar paste is a pliable, edible sugar dough used in cake decorating to cover cakes and to model figures and flowers.

Though the two are both used in cake decorating, sugar paste differs from fondant icing in that it hardens, rather than retaining a soft consistency, making it ideal for creating solid, sculpted decorations that can later be attached to a cake by other means. By contrast, the soft and malleable qualities of fondant icing make it softer and more ideal for covering cakes entirely.

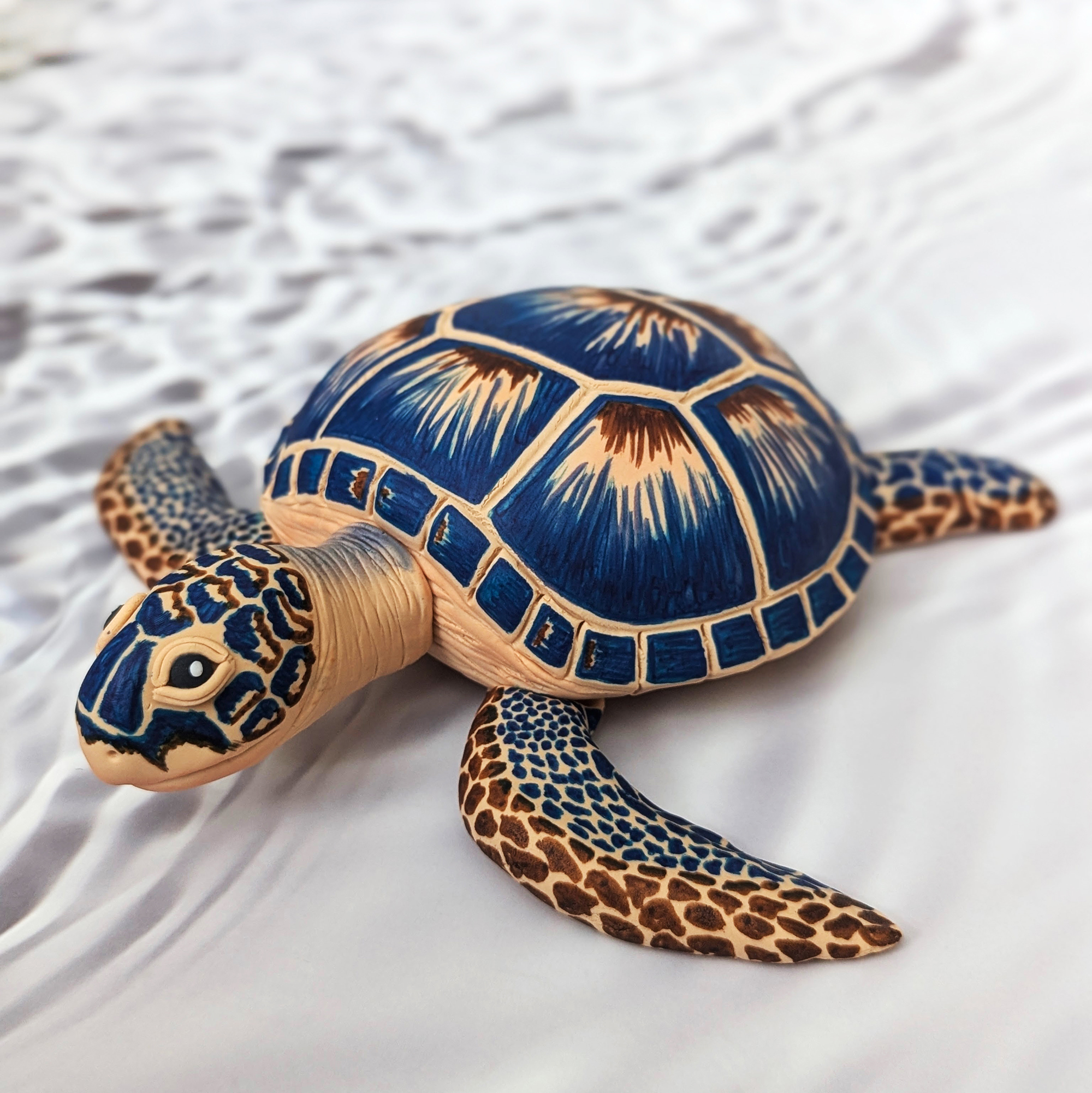
An edible sea turtle figurine made from sugar paste. Photo by MyArtistryWorld (CC BY-SA 4.0).

== Production ==
Sugar paste is produced both commercially and domestically, with commercial sugar paste holding a number of advantages that homemade sugar paste does not; commercial varieties of sugar paste can be stored for up to a year, is typically easier to manipulate and shape than homemade varieties, and can be bought in a pure-white colour, which is difficult to recreate at home.

== Gum paste ==
Gum paste (also known as flower paste) is a firmer variant of sugar paste made with added gums such as tylose (CMC) or gum tragacanth. These ingredients allow it to dry faster and harder than standard sugar paste, making it suitable for fine decorations such as flowers, figurines, and detailed sculpting. In contrast, sugar paste (rolled fondant) stays softer and is typically used for covering cakes rather than creating thin, freestanding decorations.

== History ==
Evidence for the use of sugar paste in various settings dates back to at least the 16th century.

The first sweets to go into the first Christmas crackers were made from sugar paste, and would be stamped with words and short phrases.
