= Ferriero =

Ferriero is a surname. Notable people with the surname include:

- Benn Ferriero, American professional ice hockey player
- David Ferriero, American librarian and library administrator
- Joe Ferriero, American politician
- Michela Ferriero, a bridal fashion brand and its owner
