= Cake pop =

Piece of cake styled as a lollipop

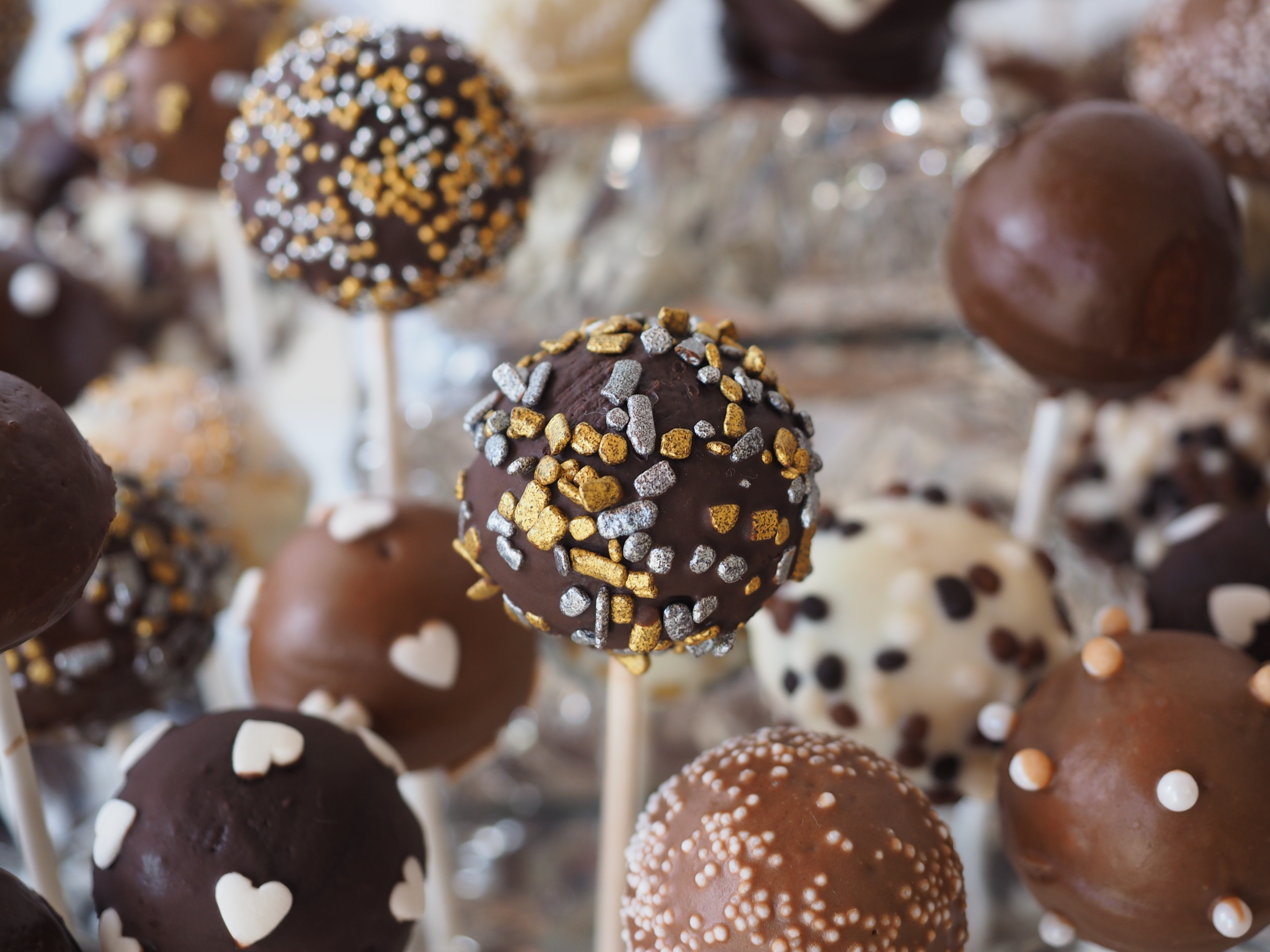
- Chocolate cake pops with sprinkles
- Place of origin: United States
- Main ingredients: Cake crumbs, icing or chocolate

A cake pop is a form of cake styled as a lollipop. Cake crumbs are mixed until bound together, sometimes using icing or chocolate, and formed into small spheres or cubes in the same way as cake balls, before being given a coating of icing, chocolate or other decorations and attached to lollipop sticks. Cake pops can be a way of using up leftover cake or cake crumbs.

== History ==
The cake pop was created by Angie Dudley. After attending a cake-decorating class in 2007, she experimented with baking and developed cake pops by modifying existing cake balls with candy coating, toppings, and a lollipop stick.

The cake pop increased in popularity during the 2010s thanks to bakers like Lerida Mojica, the creator of New York Cake Pops, whose cake pop business served thousands of individual customers as well as larger venues such as Yankee Stadium and Madison Square Garden. The major chain Starbucks began serving cake pops in 2011.

== Preparation ==
A video demonstration of the making of cake pops with a melted chocolate coating

Cake pops use many of the ingredients used in baking a traditional cake and can be made from cakes of any flavor.

Many recipes found online use a cake mix instead of a cake batter from scratch. While more convenient, it does not necessarily deliver the same result. The homemade or "made from scratch" cake recipes tend to yield a cake with a much denser crumb than what one would normally get when using a store-bought mix, which ends up performing better, especially after being mixed with homemade frosting. The denser cake is stiffer, making it easier to shape the balls and attach the sticks. Store bought mix yields a lighter cake that does not harden as much, and the sticks tend to slip out after attached.

Once the cake has been baked, or when leftovers from an existing cake have been collected, it is crumbled into pieces. These crumbs are mixed into a bowl of frosting, and the resulting mixture is shaped into balls, cubes or other shapes. Each ball is attached to a lollipop stick dipped in melted chocolate and put in the fridge to chill. Once the mixture solidifies and cools, it is dipped in melted chocolate to form a hard shell and decorated with sprinkles or decorative sugars. The cake balls can be frozen to speed the solidification process.

== See also ==
- Cake balls
- Dango
- Lolly cake
