= Cake =

Flour-based baked sweet

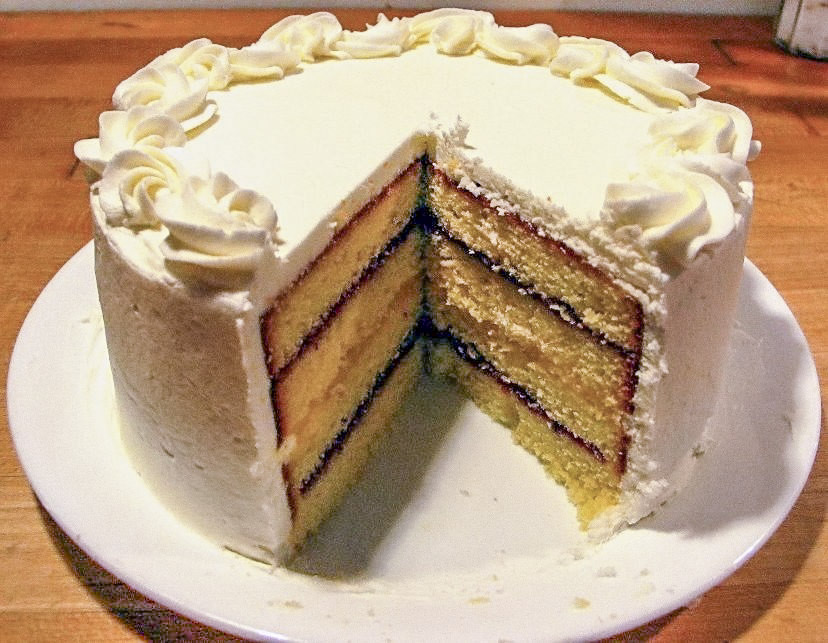
A layer cake made of pound cake, jam, and frosting.

Cake is a baker's confectionery made by combining flour with a liquid, a fat or both, and usually with a leavening agent. Cakes are usually baked, but can be griddled. In their oldest forms, cakes were modifications of bread, but cakes now cover a wide range of preparations that can be simple or elaborate and which share features with other desserts such as pastries, meringues, custards, and pies.

The most common ingredients include flour, sugar, eggs, fat (such as butter, oil, or shortening), and a leavening agent (such as baking soda or baking powder). Common additional ingredients include dried, candied, preserved or fresh fruit, nuts, cocoa, and flavor extracts such as vanilla, with numerous substitutions possible. Cakes can also be flavored with fruit preserves, nuts, or dessert sauces (like custard, jelly, cooked fruit, whipped cream, or syrups), covered with icing or frosting, and decorated with marzipan, piped borders, or candied fruit.

== Definition ==
This is called a crab cake due to its shape, but does not actually define as a cake.

The precise definition of "cake" has always been elusive. The oldest cakes were essentially breads with sweet ingredients added. Throughout much of history, terms for "bread" and "cake" were used interchangeably. Some define cake as a subtype of bread. Other foods that contain none of the properties traditionally associated with cake may be referred to, or translated, as "cake" because of their appearance or function as a dessert—for example, cheesecakes and icebox cakes. Cake, however, is normally defined as being made with a batter and not a dough mixture.

== Etymology ==
The word "cake" itself is of Viking origin, from the Old Norse word kaka.

== History ==
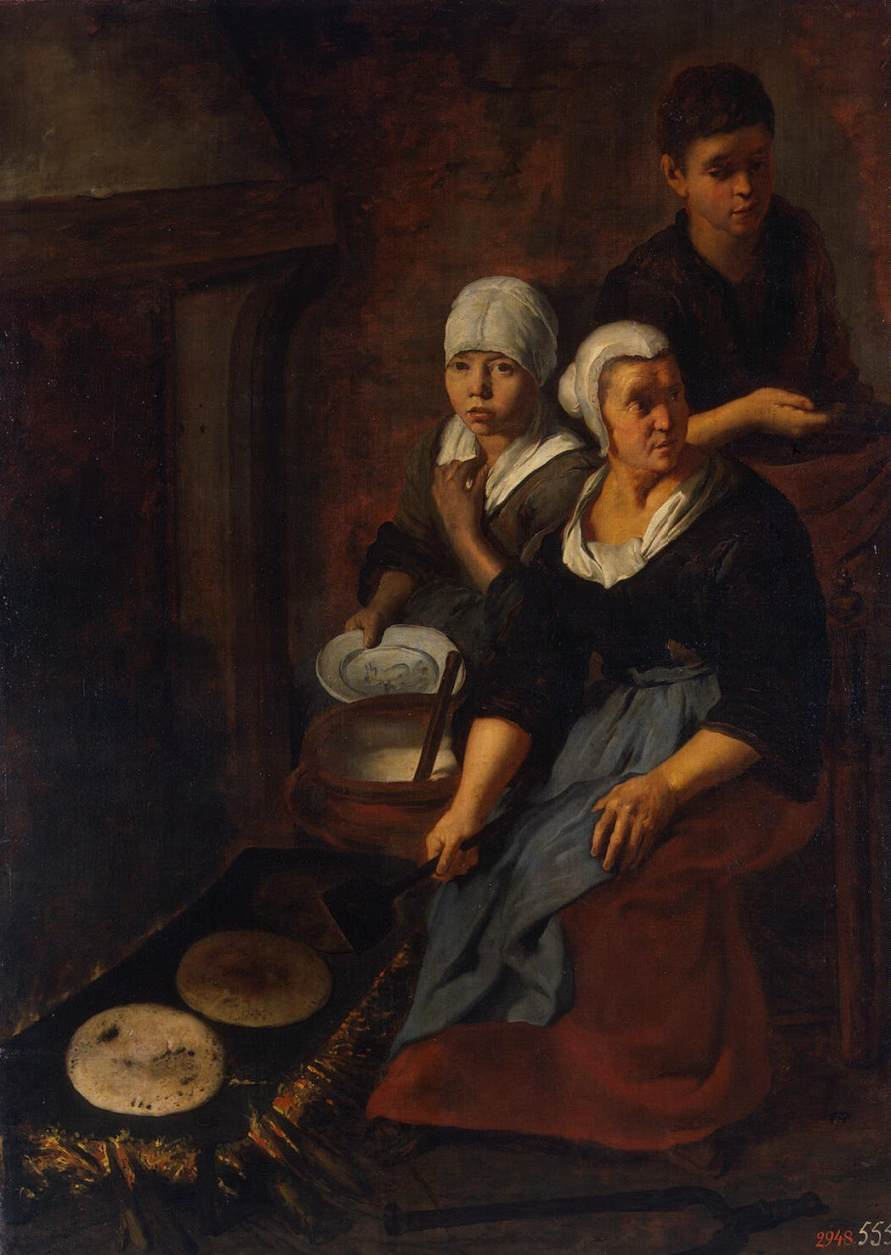
Baking of Flat Cakes by the Spanish painter Bartolomé Esteban Murillo, c. 1650

The oldest cakes were essentially breads with sweet ingredients added. The ancient Greek πλακοῦς (plakous), which was derived from the word for 'flat', πλακόεις (plakoeis), was baked using flour mixed with eggs, milk, nuts, and honey. The Greeks invented using beer as a leavener. In ancient Rome, the basic bread dough was sometimes enriched with butter, eggs, and honey, which produced a sweet and cake-like baked good. The name for cake became placenta, which was derived from the Greek term. A placenta was baked on a pastry base or inside a pastry case.

Early 14th century cakes in England were also essentially bread: the most obvious differences between a "cake" and "bread" were the round, flat shape of the cakes and the cooking method, which turned cakes over once while cooking, while bread was left upright throughout the baking process. Sponge cakes, leavened with beaten eggs, originated during the Renaissance, possibly in Spain. Cakes became fashionable in the United States in the 1920s, as women entered the labor force leaving little time to prepare multiple components for dessert.

=== Cake mixes ===
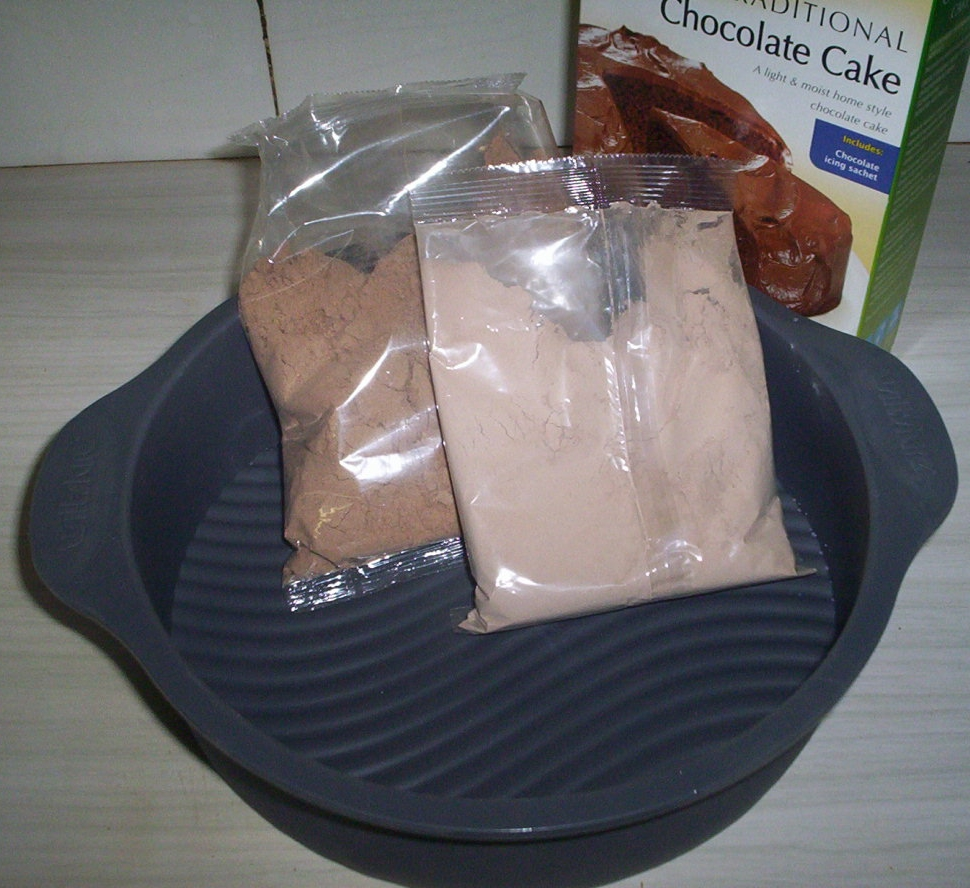
Chocolate cake mix in plastic packets

During the Great Depression, there was a surplus of molasses and the need to provide easily made food to millions of economically depressed people in the United States. One company patented a cake-bread mix to deal with this economic situation and thereby established the first line of cake in a box. In doing so, cake, as it is known today, became a mass-produced good rather than a home- or bakery-made specialty.

Later, during the post-war boom, other American companies (notably General Mills) developed this idea further, marketing cake mix on the principle of convenience, especially to housewives. When sales dropped heavily in the 1950s, marketers discovered that baking cakes, once a task at which housewives could exercise skill and creativity, had become dispiriting. This was a period in American ideological history when women, retired from the war-time labor force, were confined to the domestic sphere while still exposed to the blossoming consumerism in the US. This inspired psychologist Ernest Dichter to find a solution to the cake mix problem in the frosting. Since making the cake was so simple, housewives and other in-home cake makers could expend their creative energy on cake decorating inspired by, among other things, photographs in magazines of elaborately decorated cakes.

== Cooking techniques ==
Cake varieties are often distinguished by their ingredients and mixing techniques, both of which influence the texture of the finished cake. They may also be cooked through methods other than baking.

=== Ingredients and mixing techniques ===
The ingredients of a cake— in particular, leavening agents and fat—determine the texture and size of the finished cake.

==== Batter cake ====
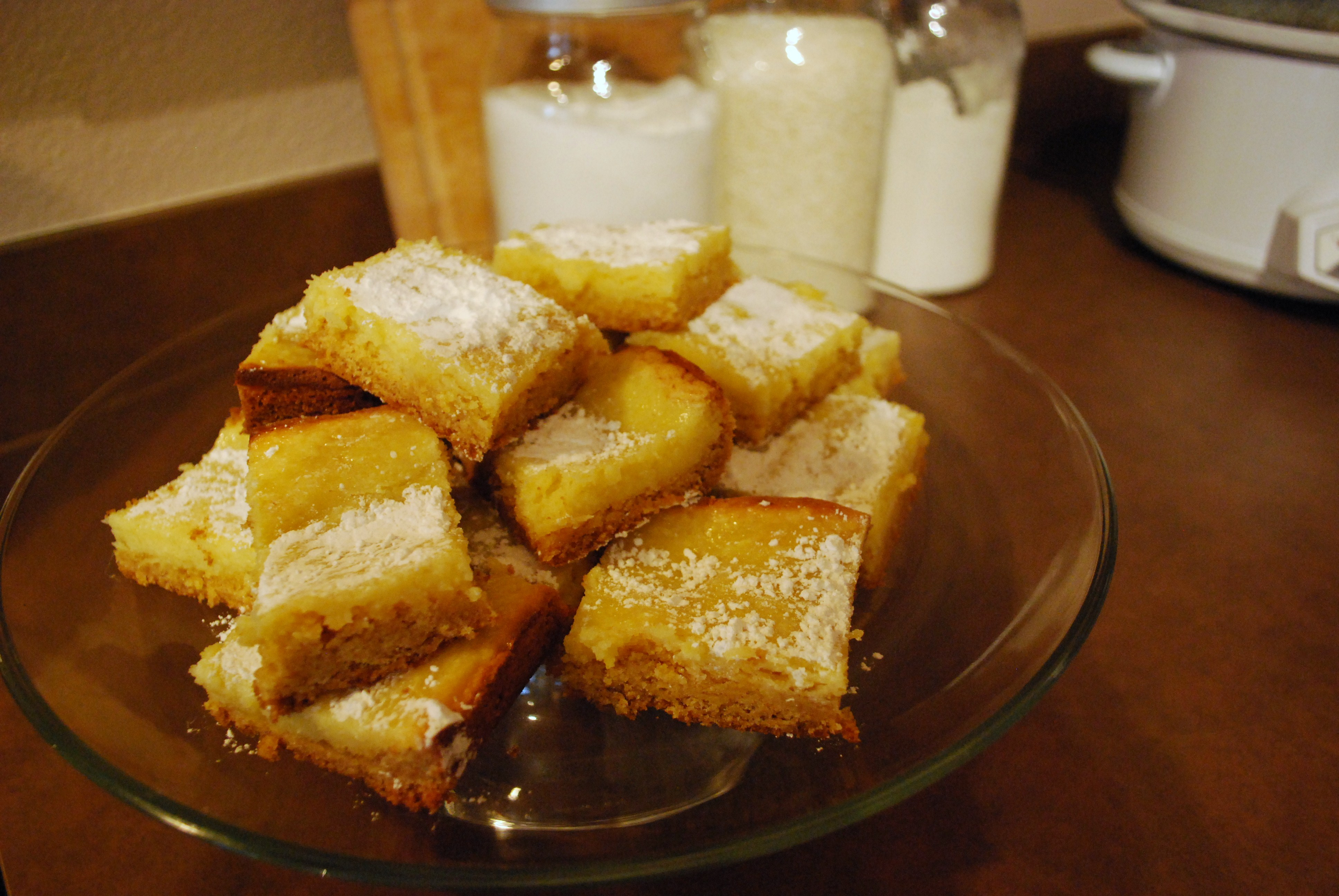
Butter cake with powdered sugar

Batter cakes are made from a liquid batter made of creamed butter or oil, sugar, eggs, and flour. They get their structure from chemical leavening agent or by beating certain ingredients (typically butter and sugar) for an extended period of time to incorporate air into the batter. Cakes made with oil tend to be more moist and dense, especially at room temperature, but may have less flavor; cakes made with butter tend to be more flavorful and have a lighter, airier texture.

Varieties include:

- Butter cake (high butter content)
- Pound cake (equal parts butter, sugar, flour, and eggs)

==== Foam cake ====
Foam cakes get their structure and volume primarily from whipping eggs and then gently combining the meringue with flour and other ingredients, though they may also incorporate chemical leaveners. Foam cakes often use cake flour for a lighter texture and typically include minimal or no fat, which can interfere with the rise. Egg-leavened sponge cakes are thought to be the oldest cakes made without yeast.

Varieties include:

- Sponge cake (uses both egg whites and yolks for a slightly denser texture, may incorporate some fat)
  - Génoise cake (with clarified butter)
- White cake (only egg whites and no fat, for a lighter texture)
  - Angel food cake (no egg yolks, no fat)

==== Chiffon cakes ====
A slice of honey chiffon cake

Chiffon cakes incorporate both batter and foam methods, and utilize oil instead of butter to keep cakes from drying out in a refrigerator.

==== Flourless cake ====
A flourless cake is a type of cake made without wheat flour. Some flourless cakes utilize an alternate kind of meal made from nuts, semolina, corn or rice; others rely on ingredients such as eggs, dairy, chocolate, or applesauce.

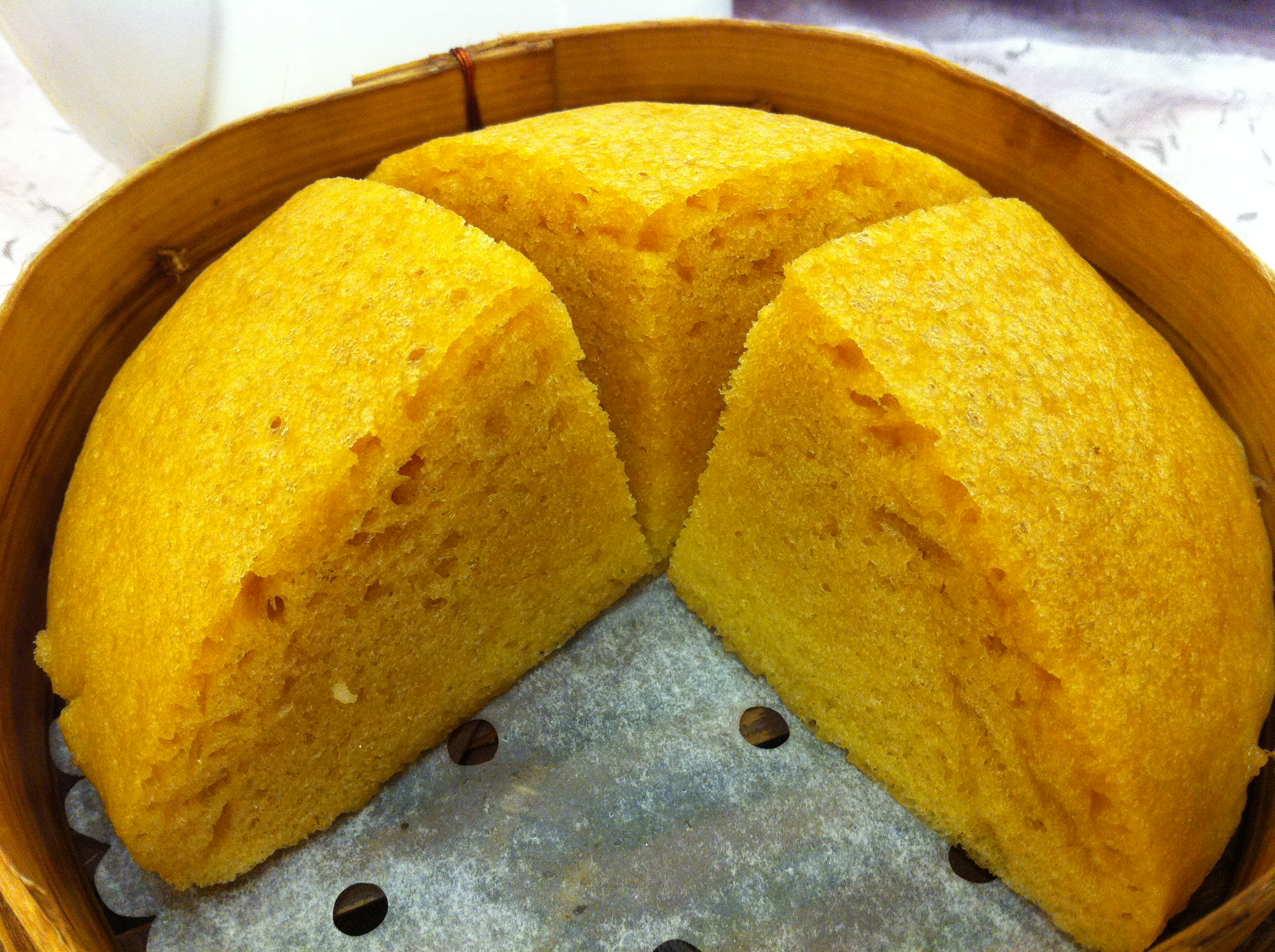
Ma lai gao, also known as steamed sponge cake

=== Cooking techniques ===
While most cakes are baked, some varieties are fried (like pancakes) or steamed.

Baked cakes rely on a correct temperature to keep the ingredients stable while rising and keep the cake from falling in on itself. In a cake that "falls", parts may sink or flatten, because it was baked at a temperature that is too low or too hot, when it has been underbaked and when placed in an oven that is too hot at the beginning of the baking process. An incorrect ratio of fat or leavening to other ingredients can also cause a cake to fall.

== Celebration cakes ==
Cakes may be classified according to the occasion for which they are intended. For example, wedding cakes, birthday cakes, cakes for first communion, Christmas cakes, and Passover plava (a type of sponge cake sometimes made with matzo meal) are all identified primarily according to the celebration they are intended to accompany. The cutting of a wedding cake constitutes a social ceremony in some cultures. The Ancient Roman marriage ritual of confarreatio originated in the sharing of a cake.

Particular types of cake may be associated with particular festivals, such as stollen or chocolate log (at Christmas), babka and simnel cake (at Easter), or mooncake. There has been a long tradition of decorating an iced cake at Christmas time; other cakes associated with Christmas include chocolate log and mince pies.

A Lancashire Courting Cake is a fruit-filled cake baked by a fiancée for her betrothed. The cake has been described as "somewhere between a firm sponge - with a greater proportion of flour to fat and eggs than a Victoria sponge cake - and a shortbread base and was proof of the bride-to-be's baking skills". Traditionally, it is a two-layer cake filled and topped with strawberries or raspberries and whipped cream.

Sometimes a cake is made less for its value as food, and more for its value as a novelty. That includes the pop out cake, which is usually a large cardboard box, covered with cake or at least frosting. A cake dress is a wearable dress that is made mostly out of cake.

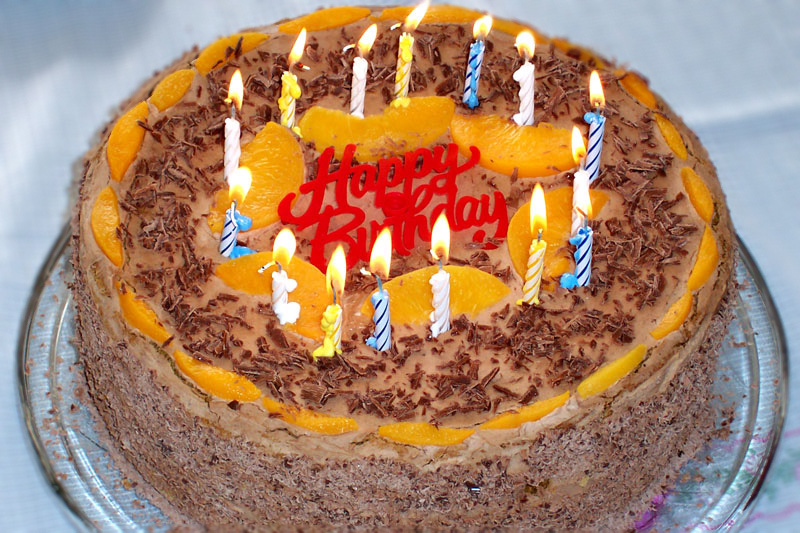
A birthday cake with candles

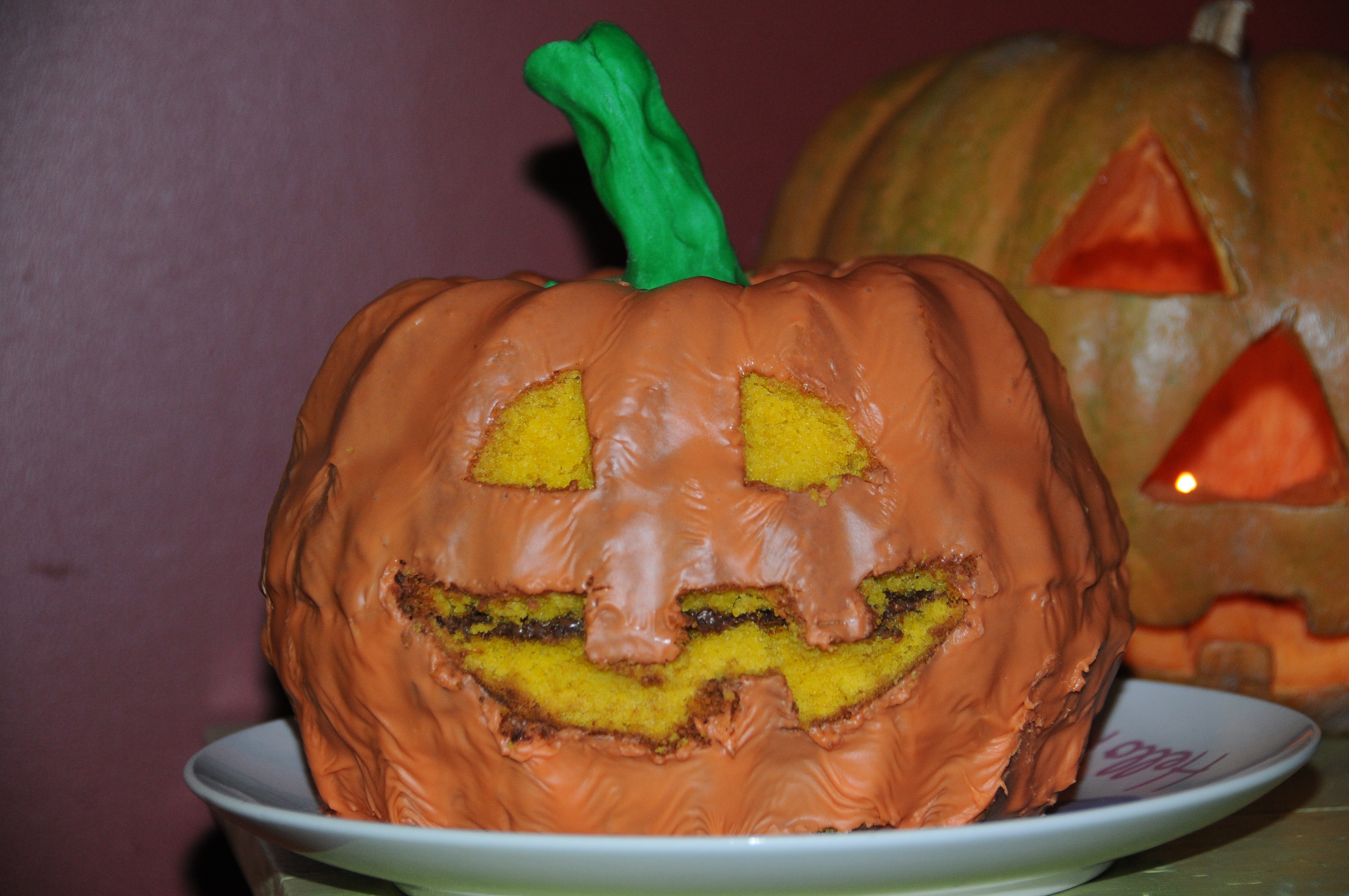
A Halloween cake shaped like a pumpkin

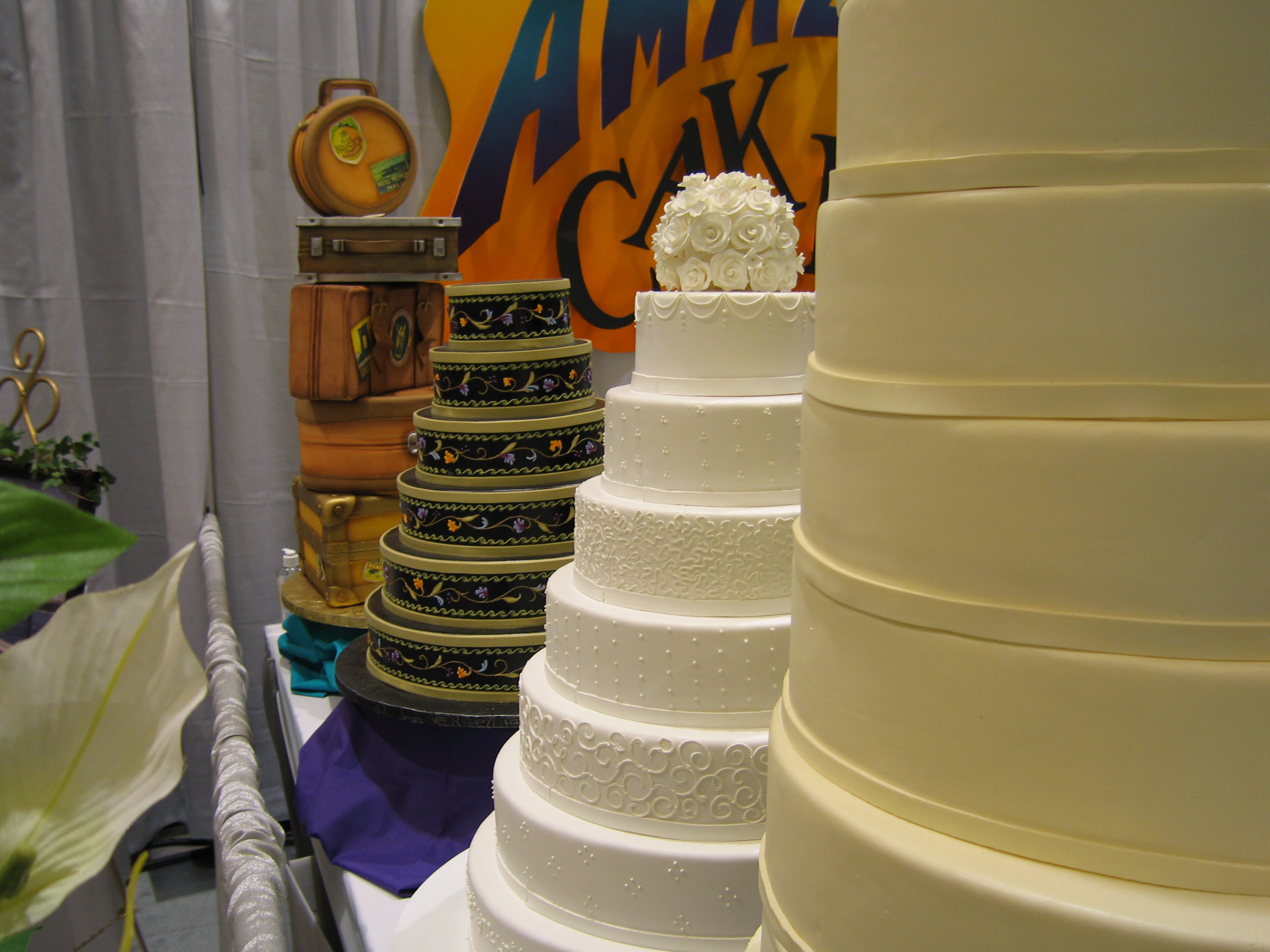
Wedding cakes at a bridal show

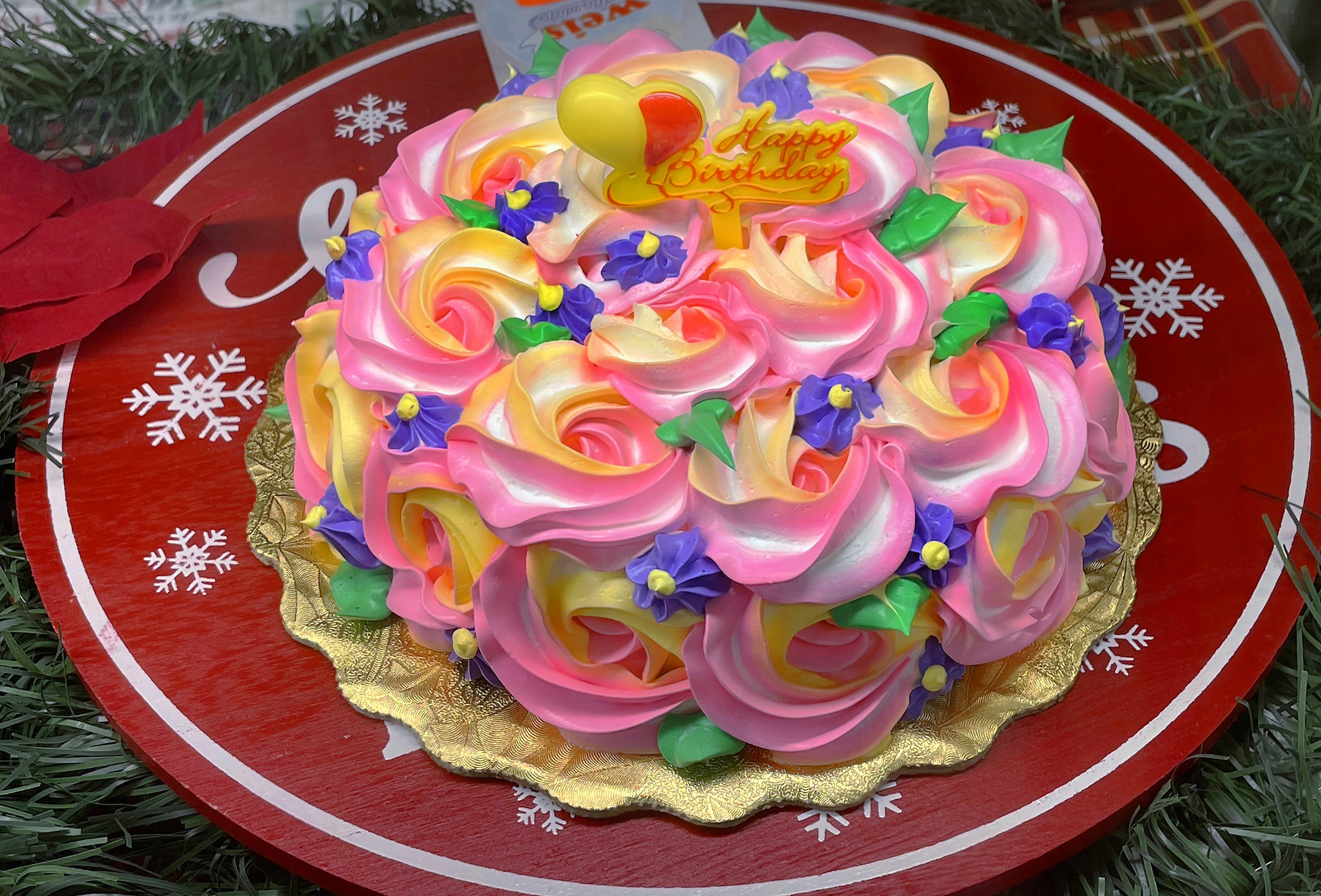
A cake with ombre rosettes

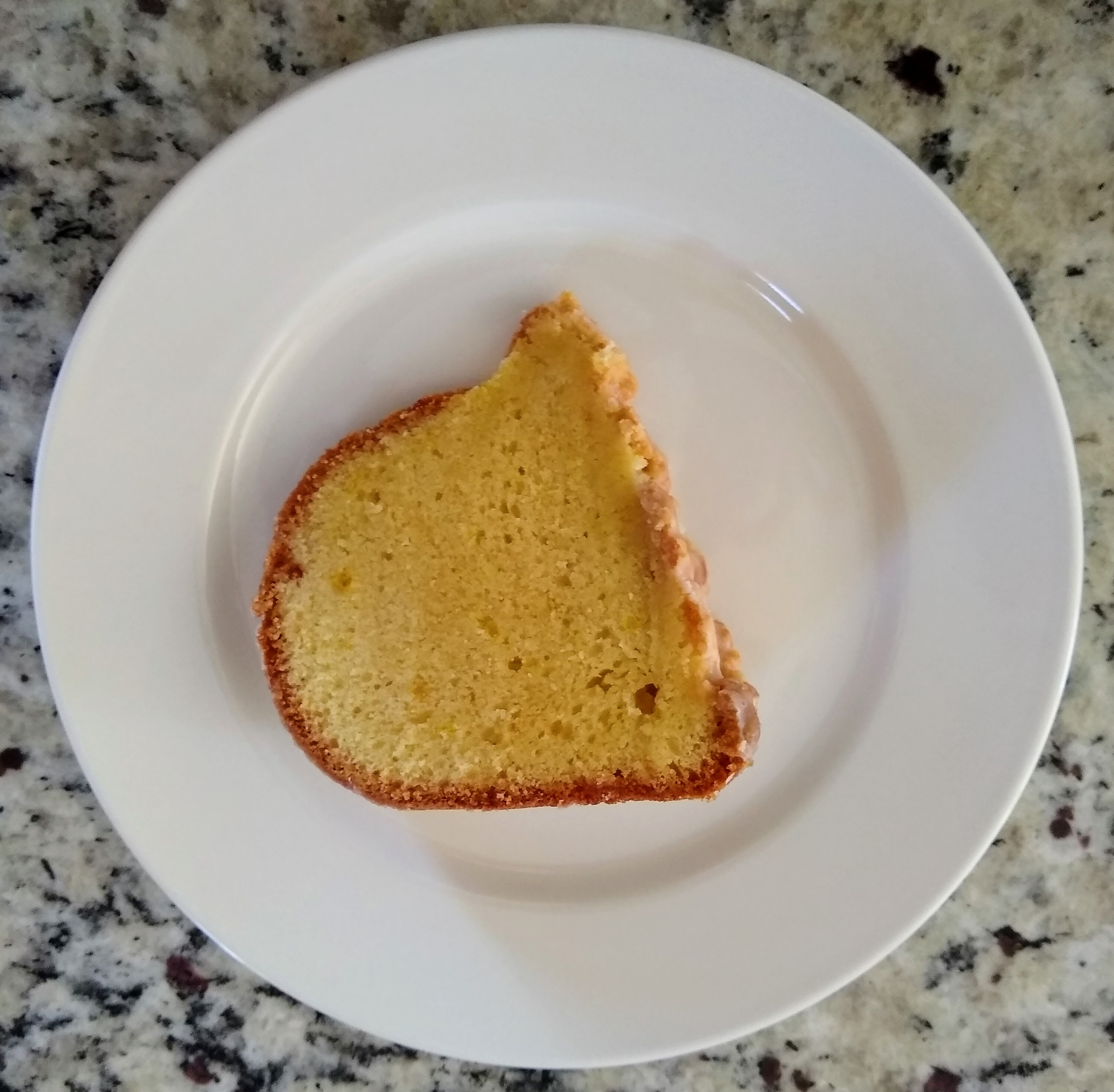
Slice of lemon pound cake

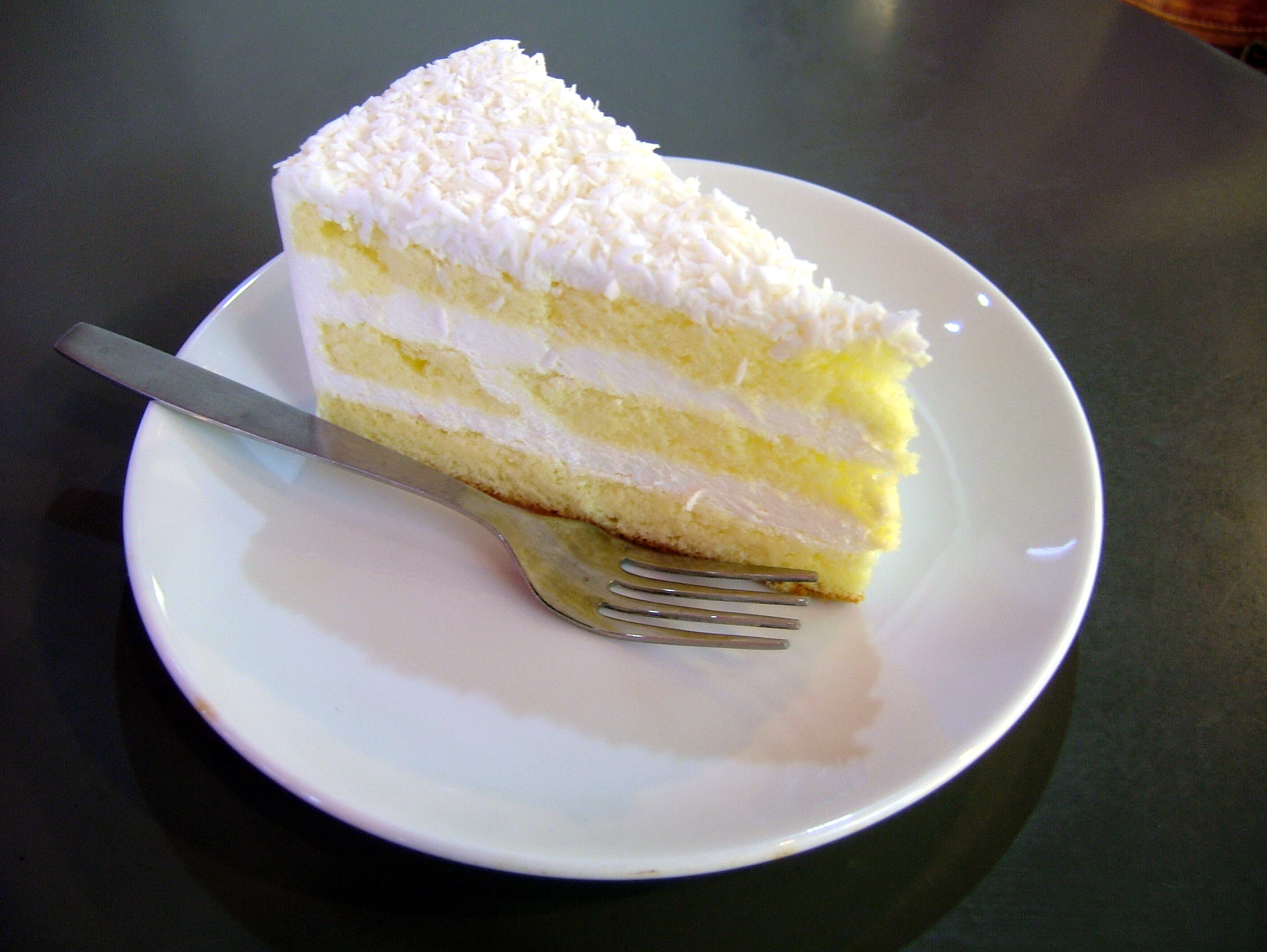
A slice of coconut cake

== Shapes ==
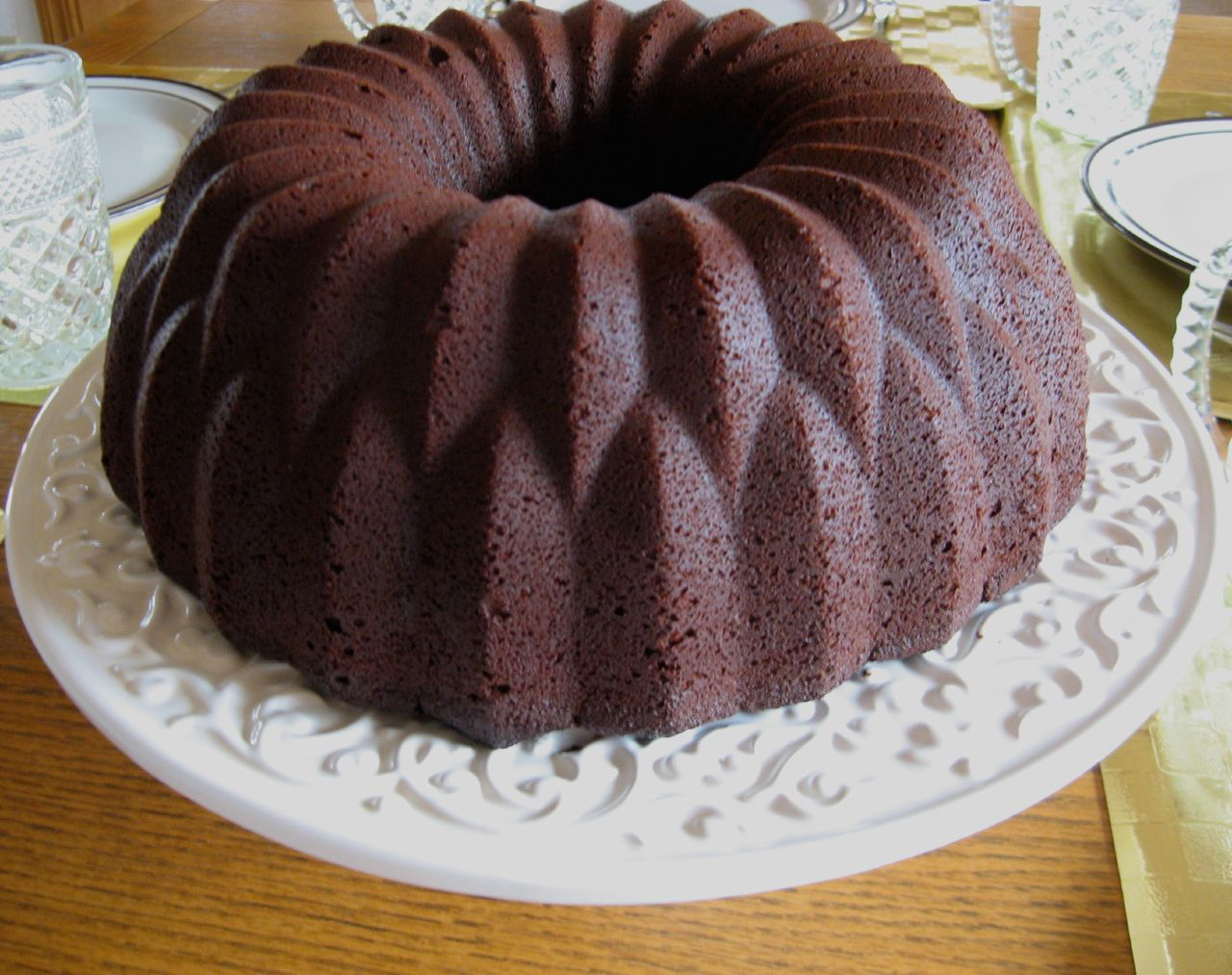
A chocolate bundt cake made with sour cream

Cakes are frequently described according to their physical form. Cakes may be small and intended for individual consumption. Larger cakes may be made to be sliced and served as part of a meal or social function. Common shapes include:

- Braided cakes
- Bundt cakes
- Cake balls
- Cake pops
- Conical, such as the Kransekake
- Cupcakes and other miniature cakes
- Layer cakes, with at least two stacked layers, frequently filled and decorated
- Sheet cakes, simple, flat, rectangular cakes baked in sheet pans
- Spit cake, a tubular cake baked on a rotating spit
- Roll cakes
Cakes by shape

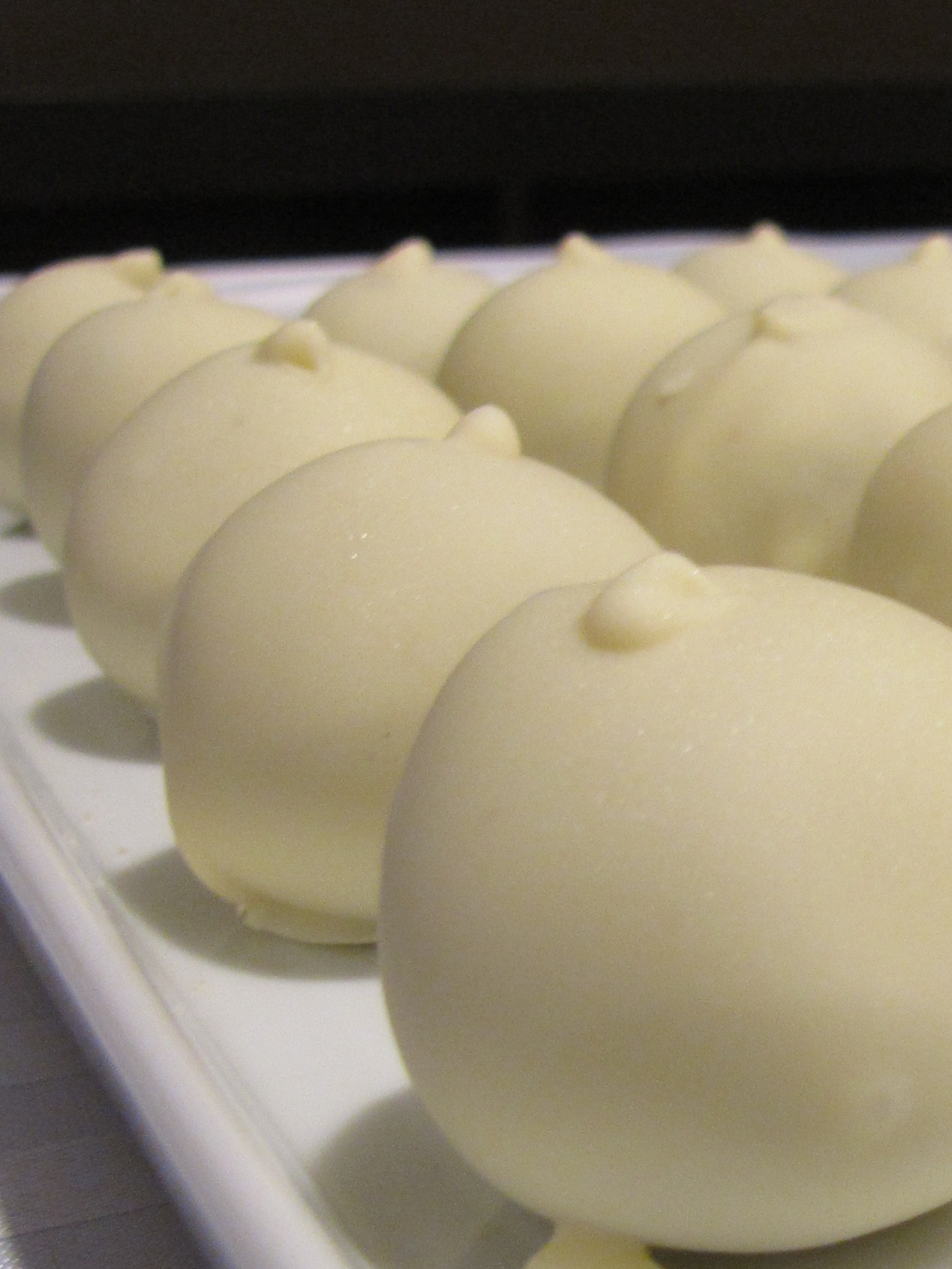
A plate of white chocolate cake balls

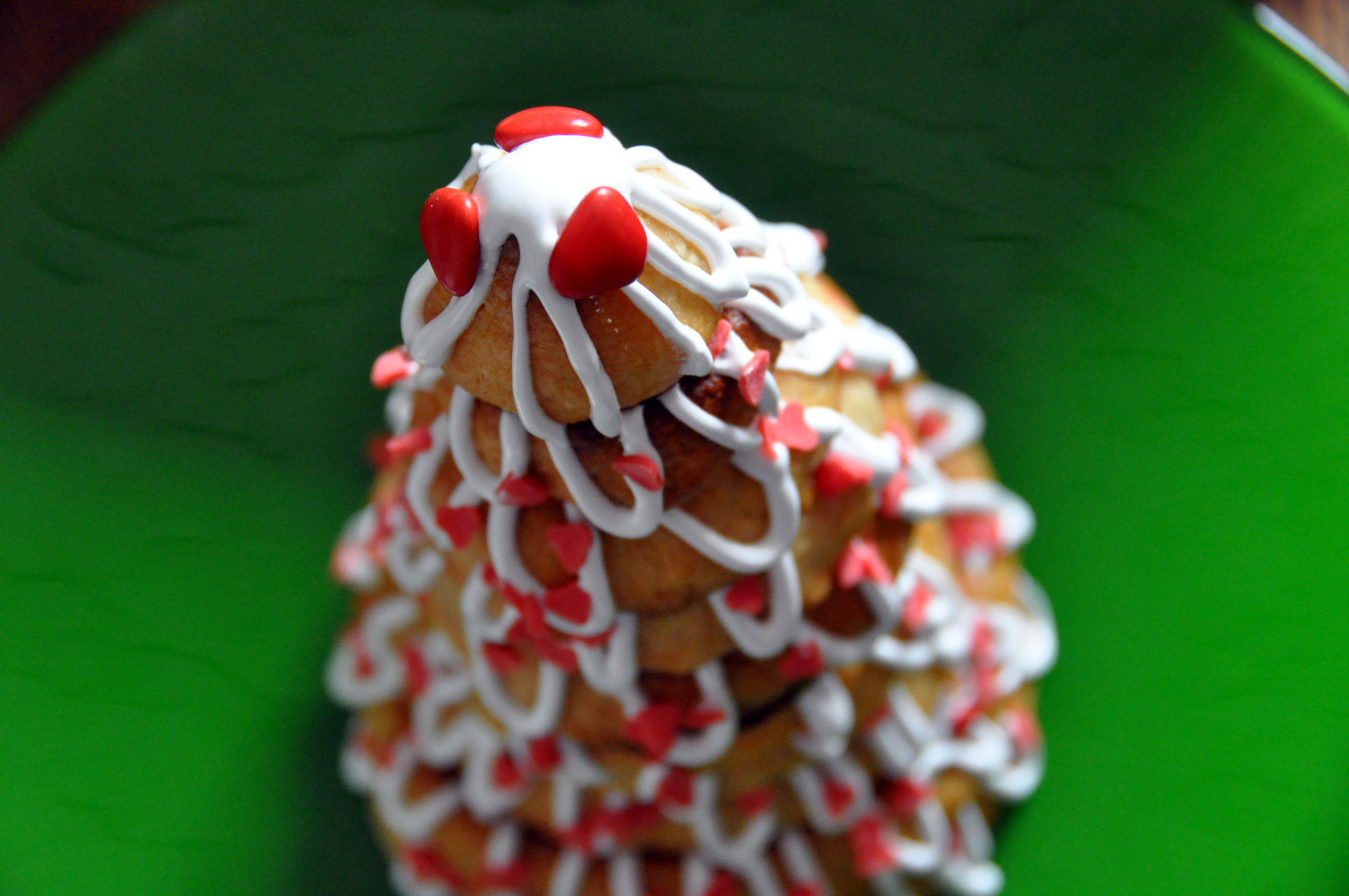
The kransekage is an example of a conical cake.

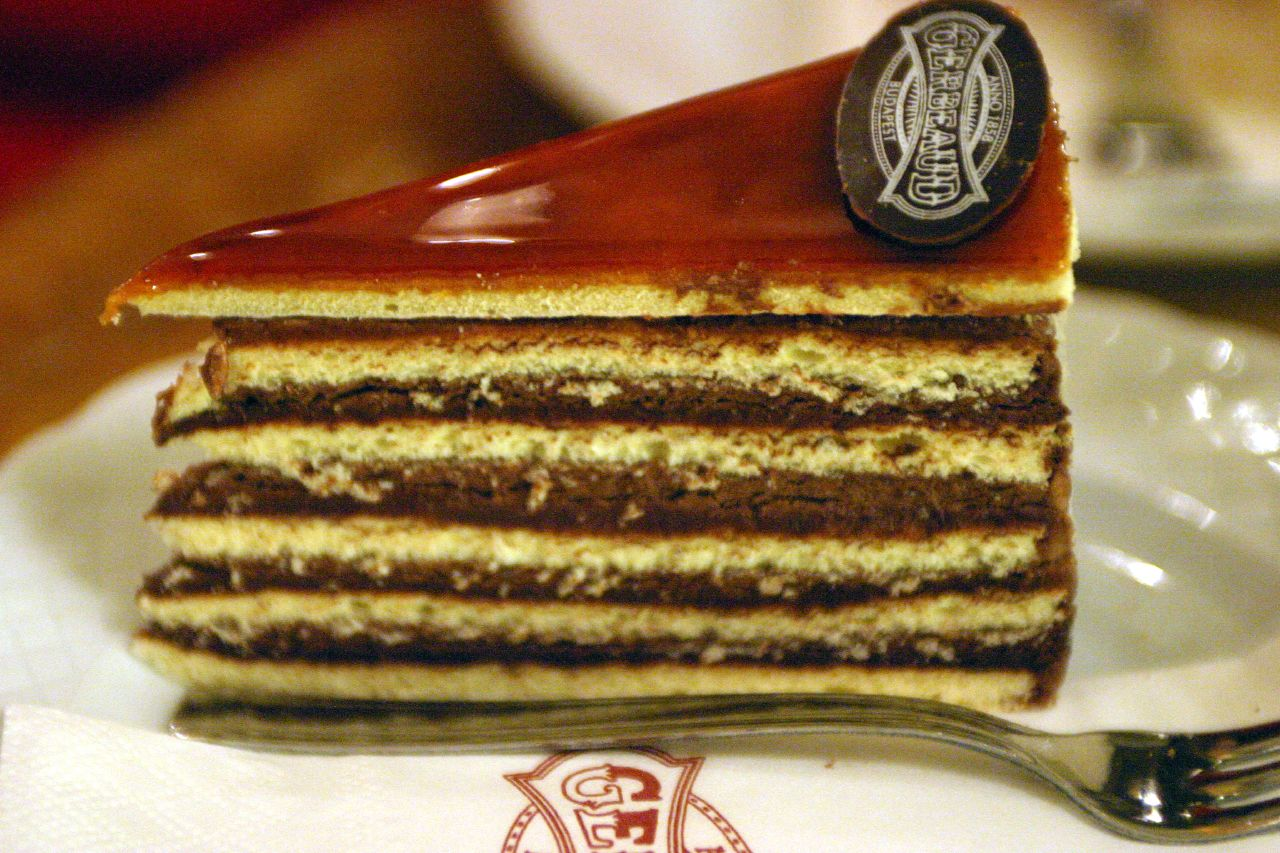
Dobos torte is an older form of layer cake.

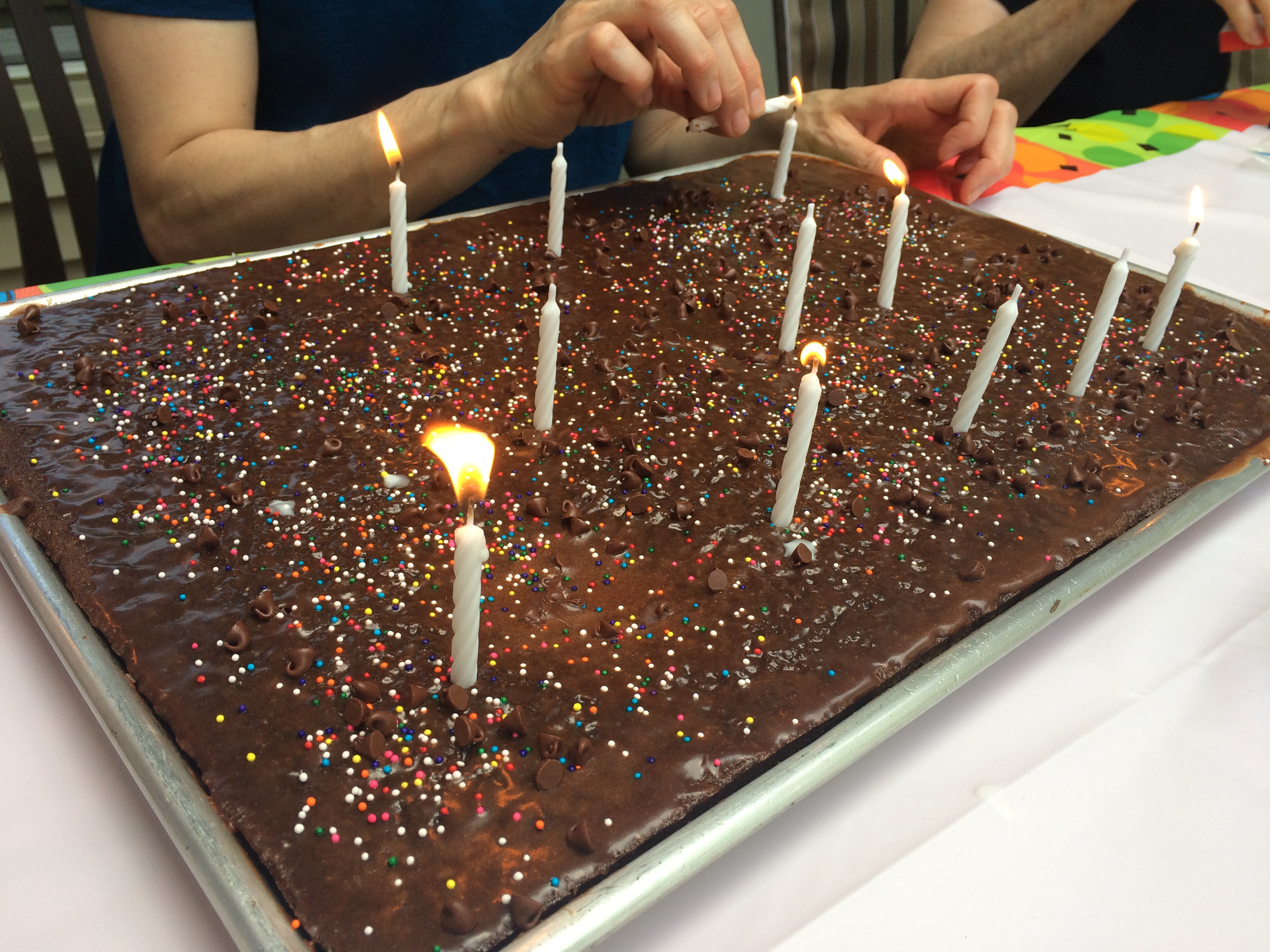
A sheet cake

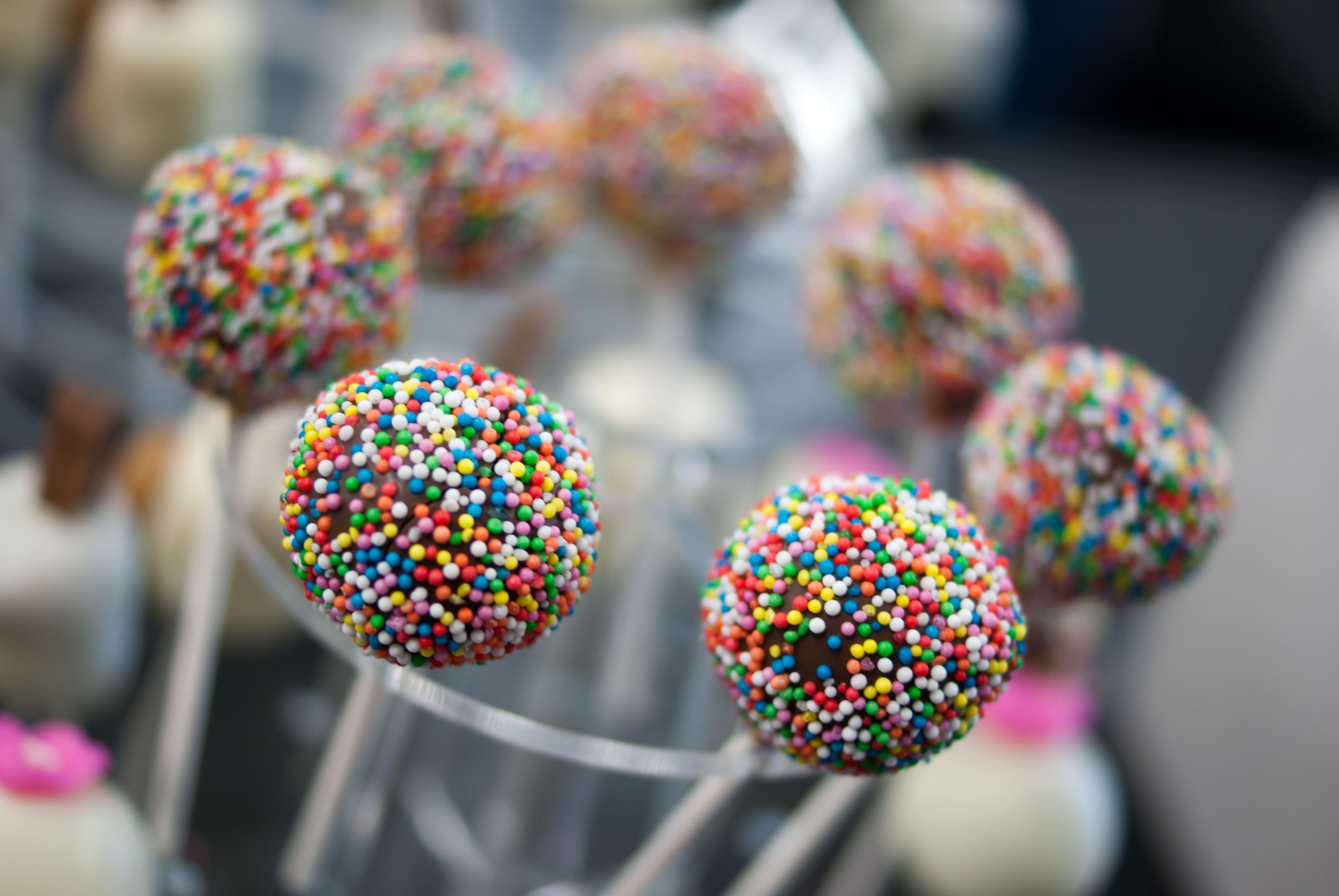
Cake pops

A heart-shaped cake

== Cake flour ==
In the US, special cake flour is available, which has a high starch-to-gluten ratio that is made from fine-textured, soft, low-protein wheat. It is strongly bleached and compared to all-purpose flour, and cake flour tends to result in cakes with a lighter, less dense texture than cakes made with all-purpose flour. In Europe, Australia and New Zealand, cake flour is banned because it is bleached, with recipes stipulating using either plain (US:All-purpose) or self-raising flour. In US recipes, cake flour is frequently specified or preferred in cakes meant to be soft, light or bright white, such as angel food cake. However, if cake flour is called for, a substitute can be made by replacing a small percentage of all-purpose flour with cornstarch or removing two tablespoons from each cup of all-purpose flour. Some recipes explicitly specify or permit all-purpose flour, notably where a firmer or denser cake texture is desired.

== Decorating ==
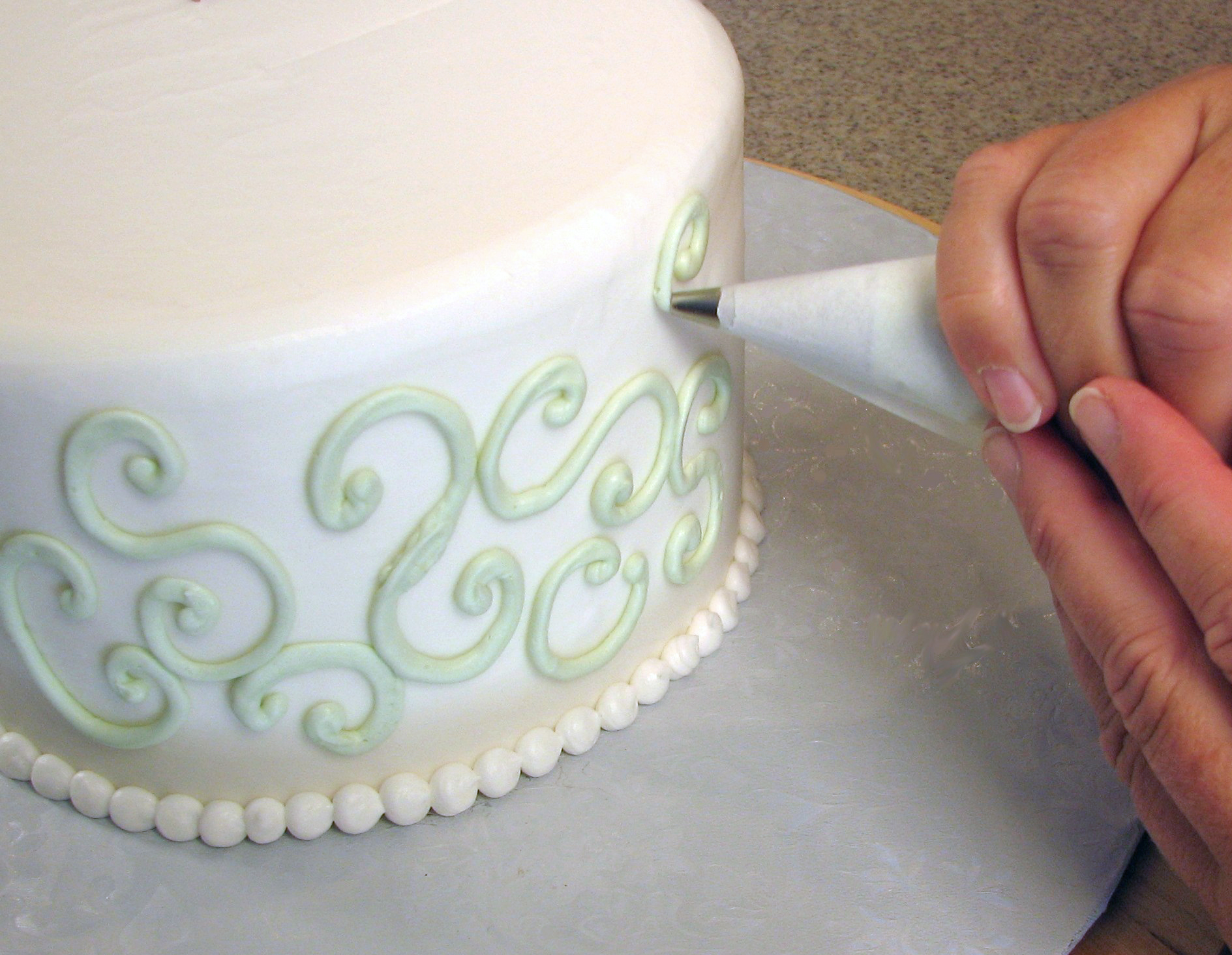
Food-dyed buttercream swirls are being piped onto the sides of a cake with a pastry bag.

A finished cake is often enhanced by covering it with icing, or frosting, and toppings such as sprinkles, which are also known as "jimmies" in certain parts of the United States and "hundreds and thousands" in the United Kingdom. The frosting is usually made from powdered (icing) sugar, sometimes a fat of some sort, milk or cream, and often flavorings such as a vanilla extract or cocoa powder. Some decorators use a rolled fondant icing. Commercial bakeries tend to use lard for the fat, and often whip the lard to introduce air bubbles. This makes the icing light and spreadable. Home bakers either use lard, butter, margarine, or some combination thereof. Sprinkles are small firm pieces of sugar and oils that are colored with food coloring. In the late 20th century, new cake decorating products became available to the public. These include several specialized sprinkles and even methods to print edible pictures and transfer the image onto a cake.

Special tools are needed for more complex cake decorating, such as piping bags and various piping tips, syringes and embossing mats. To use a piping bag or syringe, a piping tip is attached to the bag or syringe using a coupler. The bag or syringe is partially filled with icing which is sometimes colored. Using different piping tips and various techniques, a cake decorator can make many different designs. Basic decorating tips include open star, closed star, basketweave, round, drop flower, leaf, multi, petal, and specialty tips. An embossing mat is used to create embossed effects. A cake turntable that cakes are spun upon may be used in cake decoration.

Royal icing, marzipan (or a less sweet version, known as almond paste), fondant icing (also known as sugar paste), and buttercream are used as covering icings and to create decorations. Floral sugarcraft or wired sugar flowers are an important part of cake decoration. Cakes for special occasions, such as wedding cakes, are traditionally rich fruit cakes or occasionally Madeira cakes, that are covered with marzipan and iced using royal icing or sugar-paste. They are finished with piped borders (made with royal icing) and adorned with a piped message, wired sugar flowers, hand-formed fondant flowers, marzipan fruit, piped flowers, or crystallized fruits or flowers such as grapes or violets.

Decorated cakes

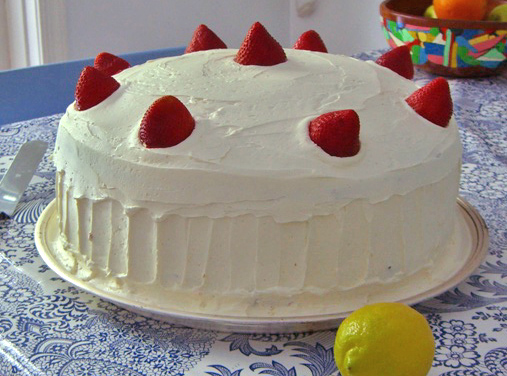
A cake garnished with strawberries

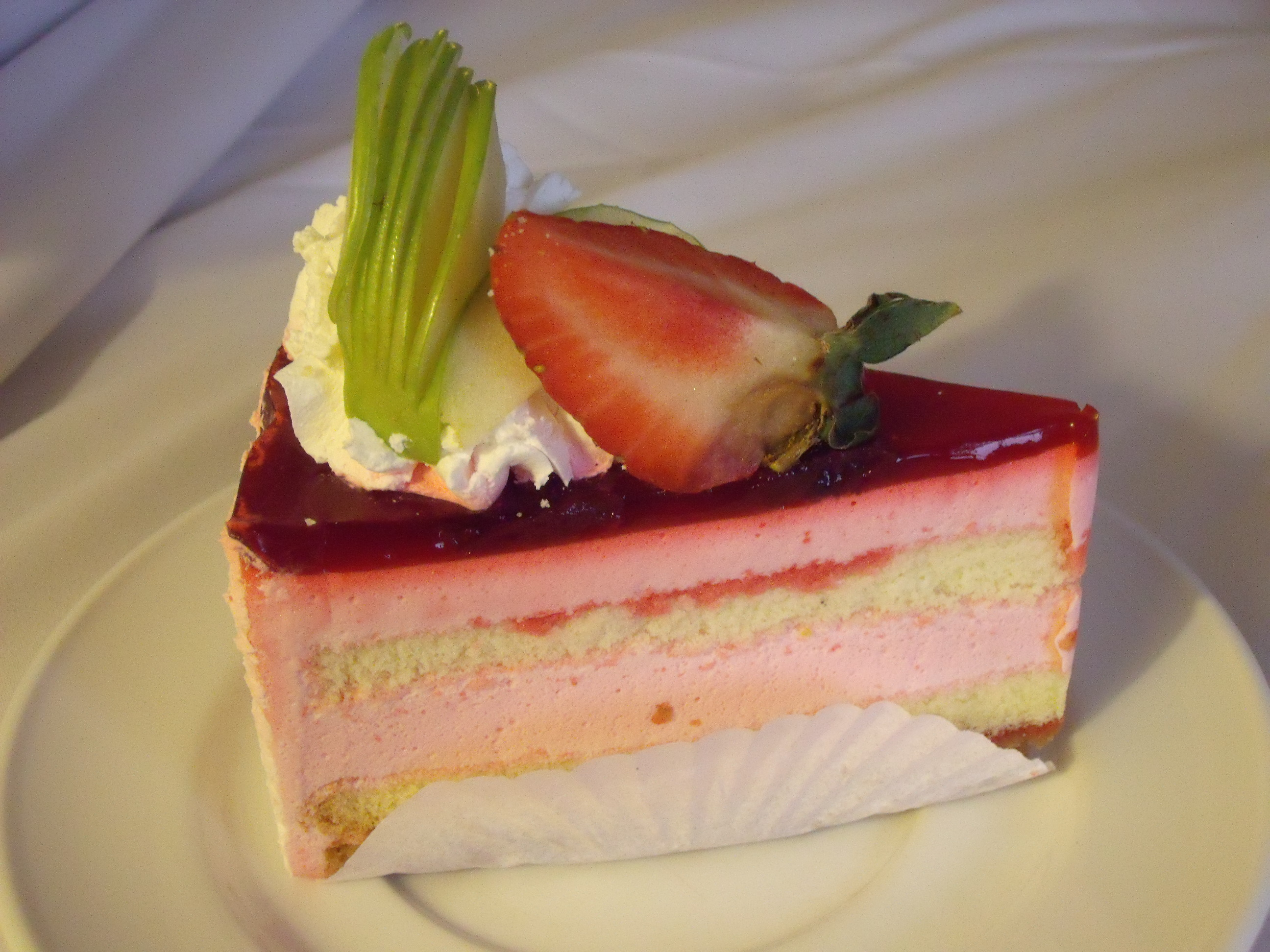
A slice of strawberry cake topped with a piece of strawberry

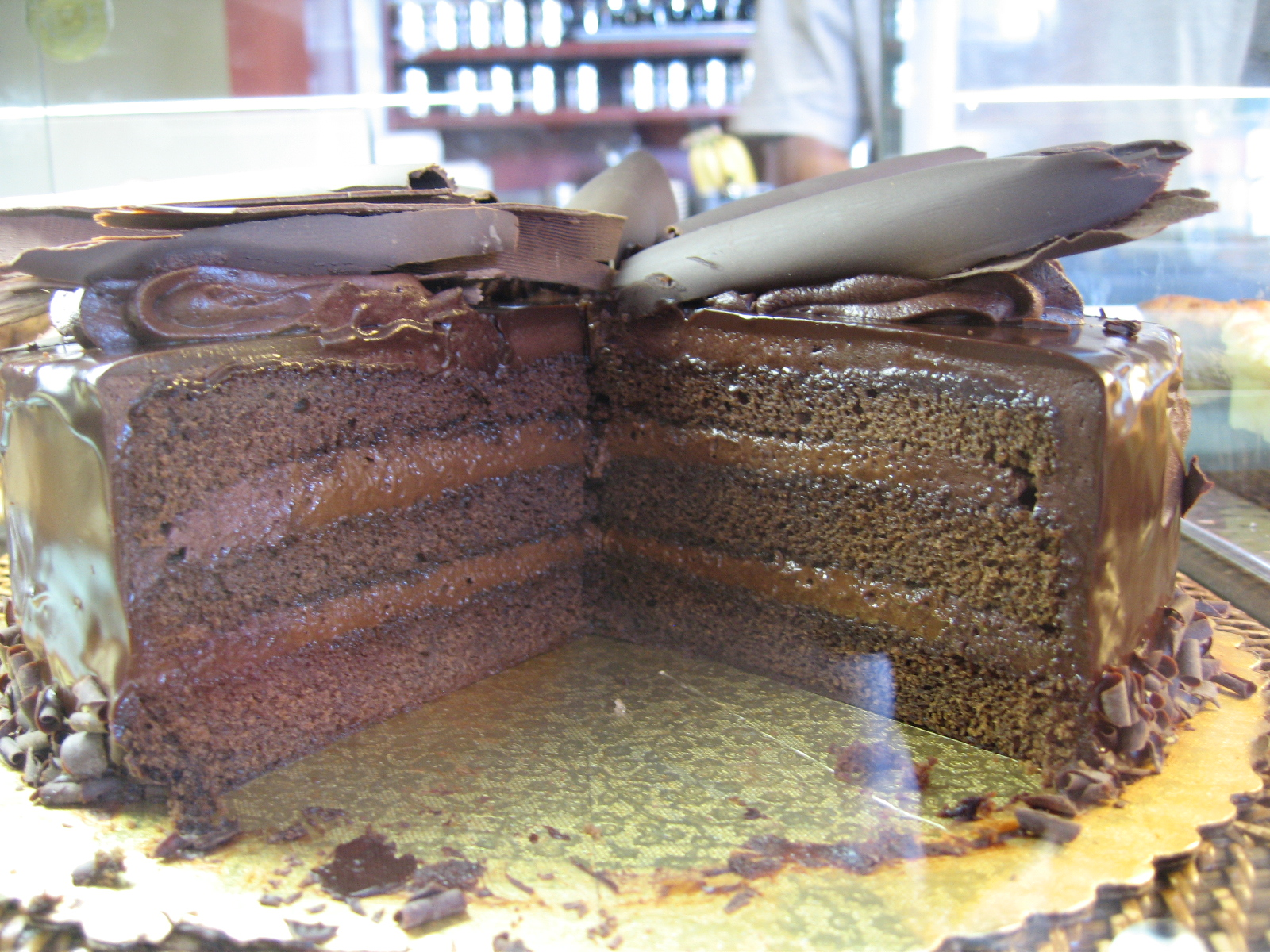
Chocolate layer cake with chocolate frosting and shaved chocolate

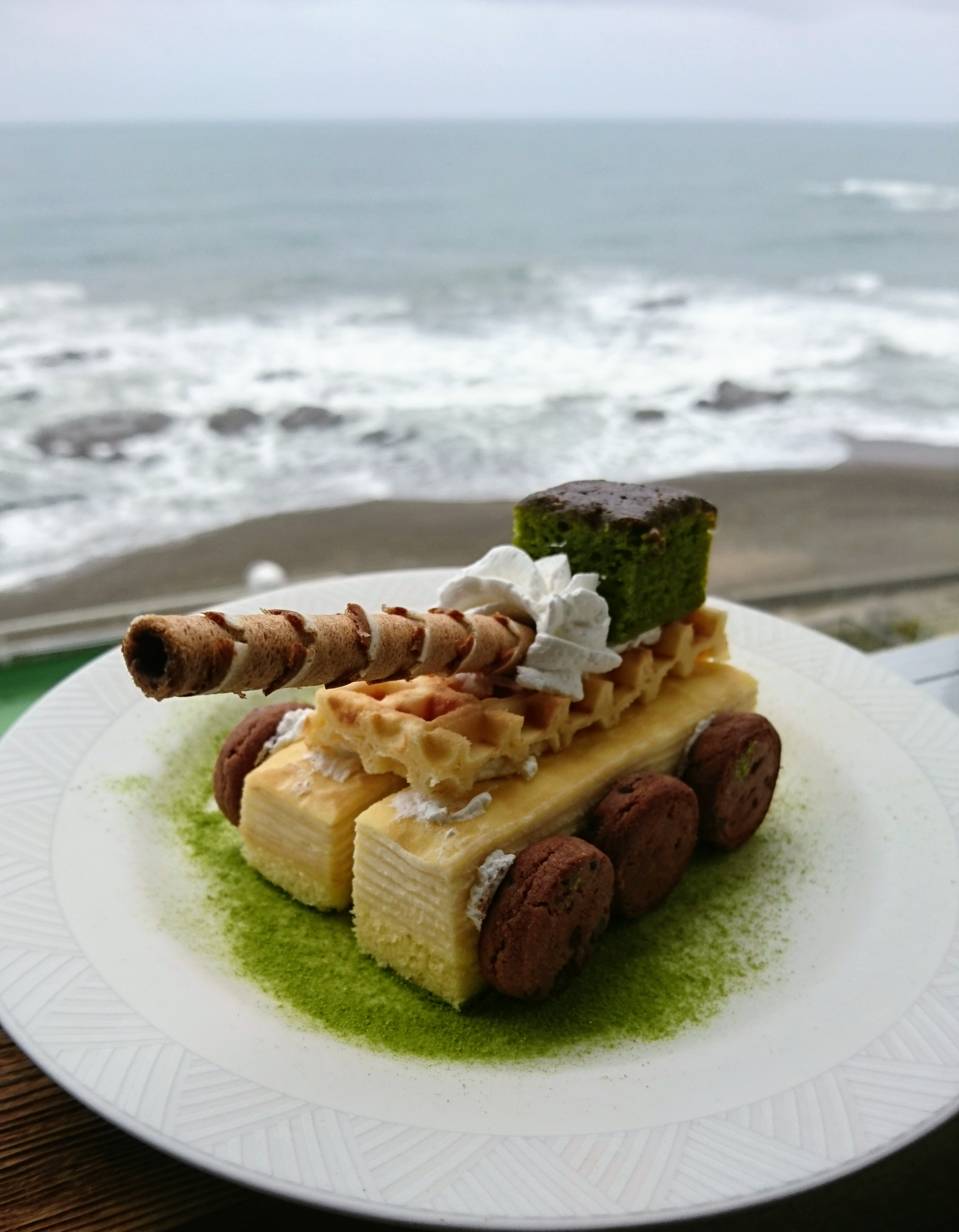
Tank-shaped cake famous in Ōarai, Japan

A vanilla strawberry cake

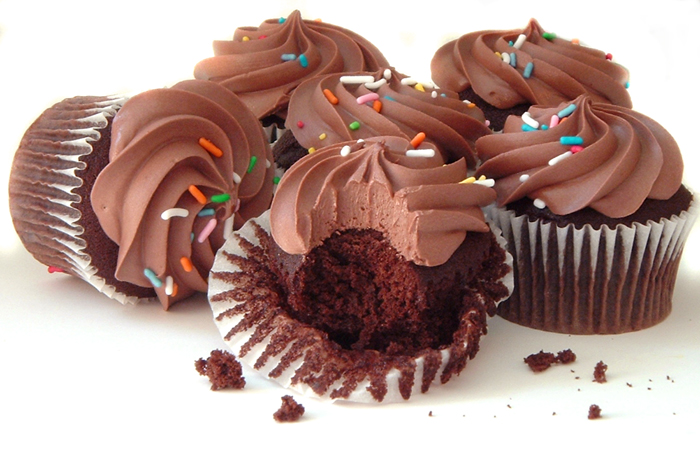
Chocolate cupcakes with sprinkles

== Food safety ==
The shelf life of cakes packaged for commercial sale depends on several factors. Cakes are intermediate moisture products prone to mold growth. Commercial cakes are commonly exposed to different mold varieties before they are packaged for sale, including Aspergillus flavus and various penicillins, and Aspergillus niger. Preservatives and oxygen absorbents are currently used to control and inhibit mold growth.

In the US, the CDC has recommended not to eat raw cake batter because it can contain pathogens like Salmonella and E. coli. Cake batter uses raw flour, which can contain live bacteria and present a hazard if consumed.

== See also ==
- List of cakes
- List of baked goods
- List of desserts
- Pie
- Torte
- Turnover
