= Cake balls =

Piece of cake coated with chocolate or frosting

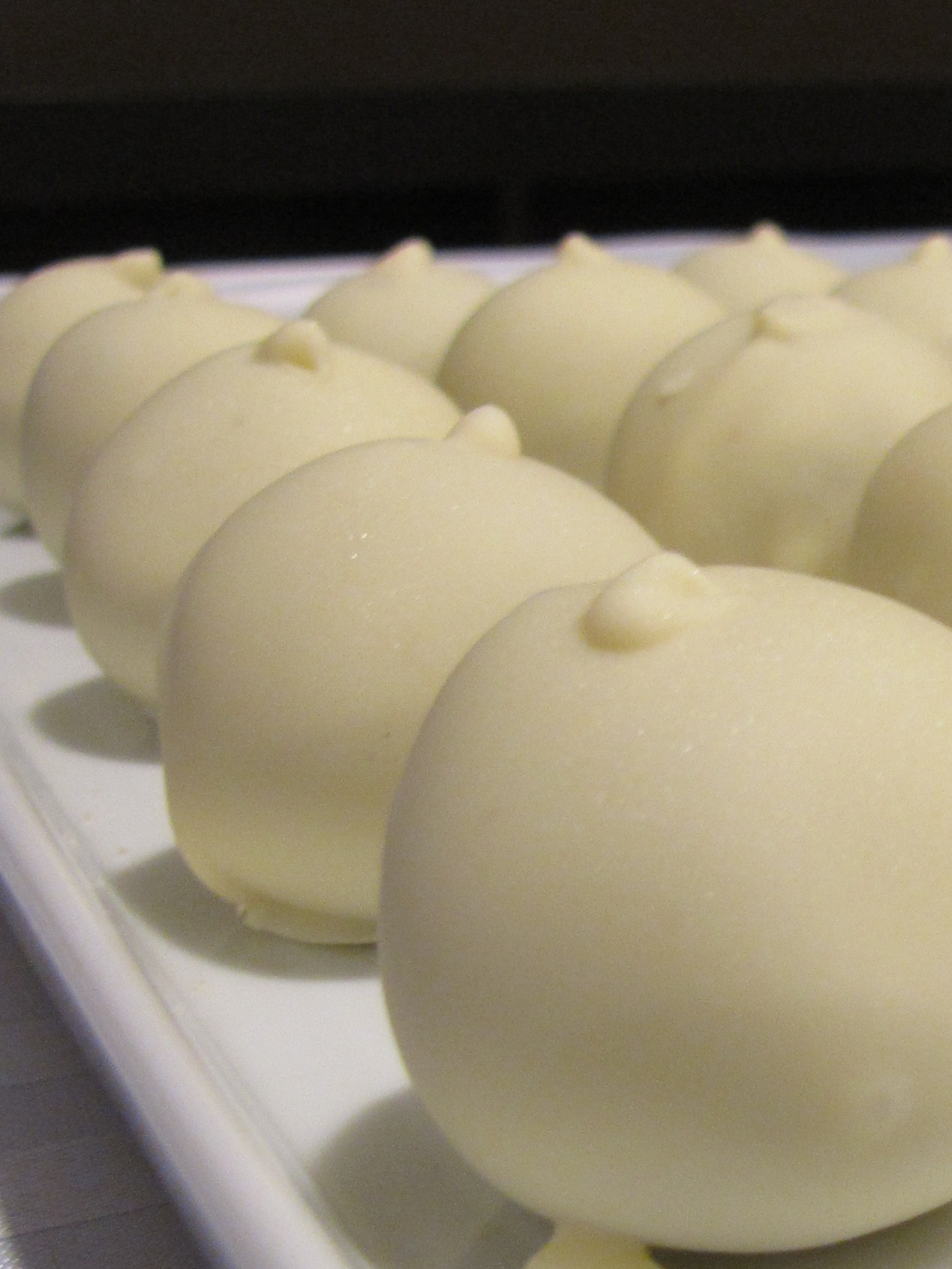
- A plate of white chocolate cake balls
- Main ingredients: Cake crumbs, chocolate or icing

Cake balls are small spheres of reconstituted cake crumbs, coated with chocolate or frosting. They are made by blending cake crumbs with icing, shaping them to form a ball and then dipping them in a coating, such as melted chocolate. Cake balls were originally created from the crumbs of leftover or stale cake to prevent waste.

Cake balls do not have the consistency of the traditional sweetened, baked and leavened cakes, but have a consistency similar to dough which can be attributed to the blending of the cake crumbs and icing. Cake balls are sold in various bakeries as well as mall kiosks; they are also available to be purchased as gifts. The bite-sized snacks may be displayed on a stick (known as a cake pop), and can be decorated with ribbon. They are especially popular during the holiday months.

Cake balls can be decorated in a variety of ways, using such items as sprinkles, nuts, chocolate shavings, candy or other confectionery toppings. Almond bark or confectionery coating are often used as alternatives to chocolate, and can be easily melted in a microwave oven before dipping.

== See also ==
- Cake pop
- Chocolate balls
