= Cake dress =

Cake in the form of wearable dress

The cake dress is a confectionery creation, designed and crafted to resemble a fashionable dress in its form and appearance.

== Award ==
Natasha Coline Kim Fah Lee Fokas, a baker from Switzerland, has achieved recognition from the Guinness World Record for creating the largest wearable cake dress in the world, with a weight of 131.15 kilograms and a sturdy support system. To break the world record, the cake must weigh 68 kg or more and the model must walk 5 meters without the dress falling apart. Natasha Coline Kim Fah Lee Fokas undertook her attempt to break the world record during the Swiss World Wedding fair. On January 15, 2023, in Bern, Switzerland, she presented her dress, which was crafted from materials commonly utilized in cake-making, to the public.

== See also ==
- Michela Ferriero
