= Pastry bag =

Kitchen utensil

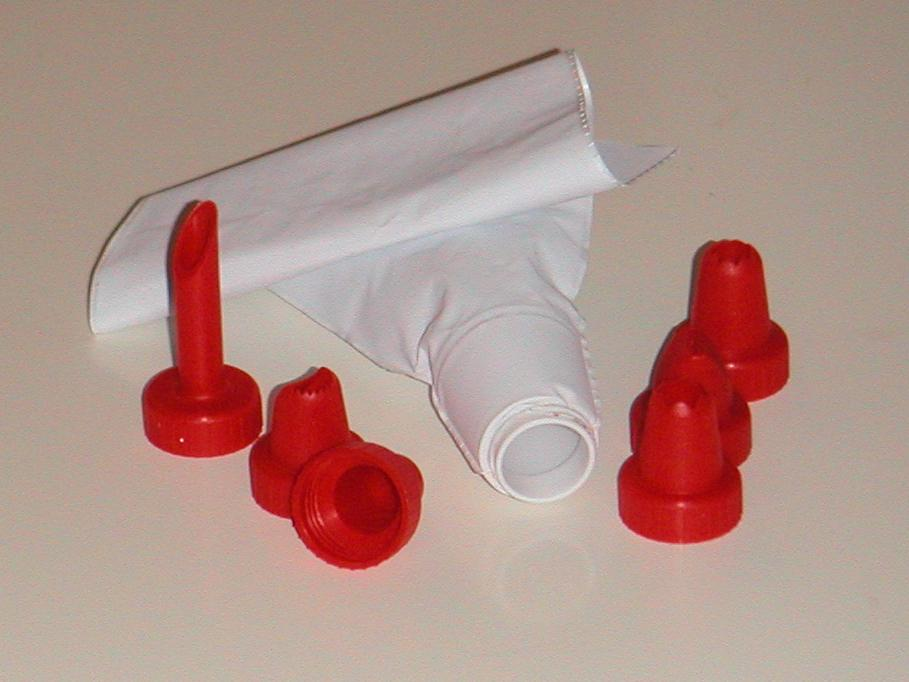
An inexpensive pastry bag, with an inner ring insert and a variety of plastic tips that screw onto the ring

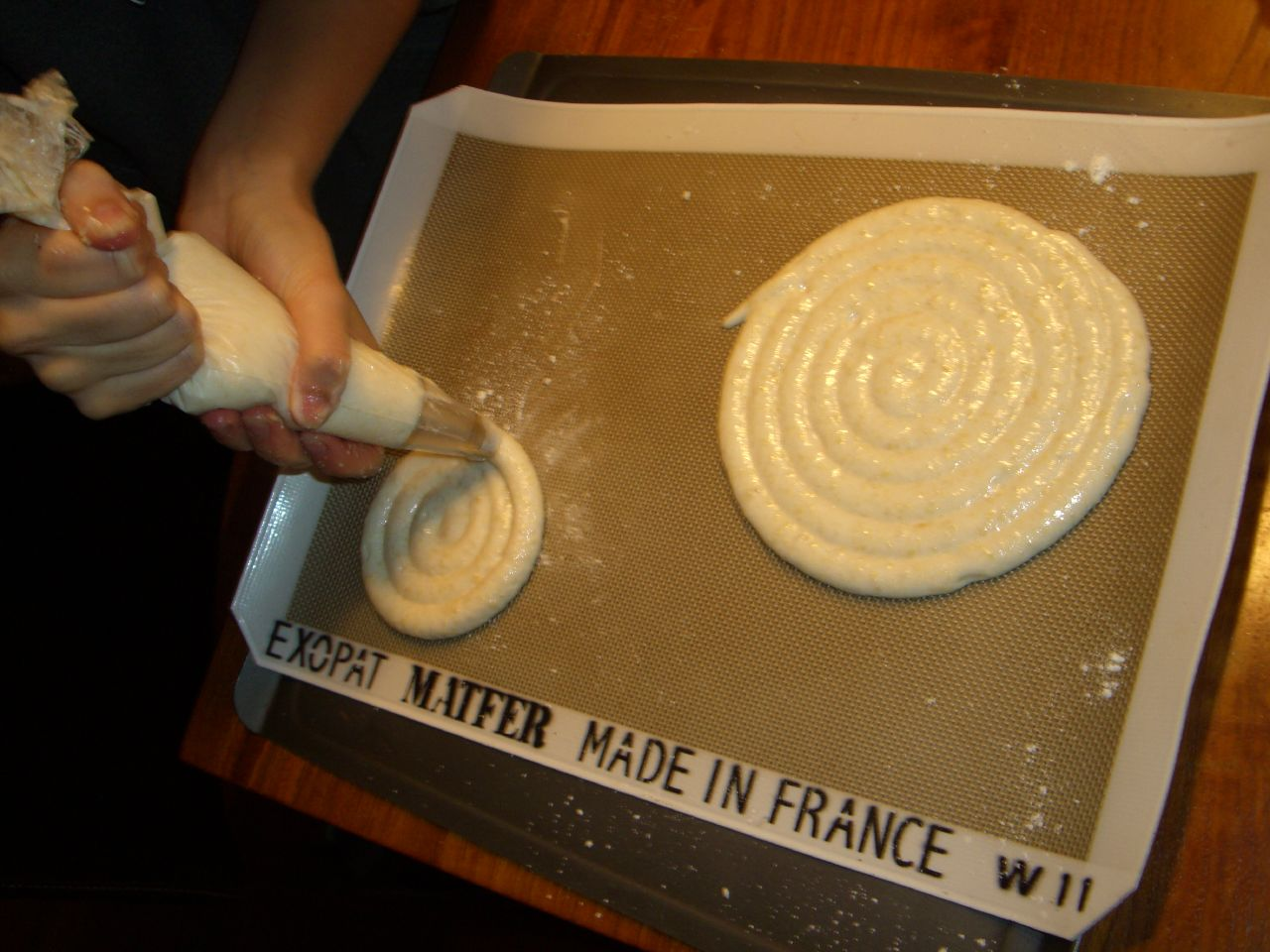
Piping dacquoise meringue disks onto a baking sheet

A pastry bag (or piping bag in the Commonwealth) is an often cone- or triangular-shaped bag made from cloth, paper, plastic, or the intestinal lining of a lamb, that is squeezed by hand to pipe semi-solid foods by pressing them through a narrow opening at one end often fitted with a shaped nozzle, for many purposes including in particular cake decoration and icing. It is filled through a wider opening at the opposite end, rolled or twisted closed, and then squeezed to extrude its contents. Many differently shaped nozzles are used to produce cross-sections such as star, leaf, and flower-petal shapes; a simple circular nozzle makes round shapes and is also used for filling pastries such as profiteroles.

In addition to icing, pastry bags are commonly used to shape meringue and whipped cream, and to fill doughnuts with jelly or custard. They are used to form cream puffs, éclairs, and ladyfingers. Bags can also be used to shape savory foods such as filling for deviled eggs, whipped butter, and mashed potatoes (especially for Pommes duchesse).

Reusable bags are usually made from tightly woven nylon, polyester, rubber or waterproofed (plastic-coated) cotton. After use they are washed and hung to dry. A high-quality bag may last for many years.

Disposable bags do not require washing; they are typically made of inexpensive plastic. A plastic food storage bag may be used as a pastry bag. For small quantities and fine piping, a pastry bag can be made by rolling cooking parchment or wax paper into a cone, filling it, folding the wide end several times to close it, and then cutting the tip into whatever shape is desired. This is especially useful for small quantities of melted chocolate, since a very small hole can be cut and the bag can be discarded when it cools and becomes clogged.

Interchangeable tips usually come in sets; particular tips can often be purchased individually. They may be chrome-plated or stainless steel, or plastic. Each tip is cone-shaped, with a base too large to fit through the small opening in the bag; in some cases they are inserted through the larger opening before food is spooned in. If tips need to be interchanged without emptying the bag, they can be used with pairs of adapter rings: an inner ring is dropped inside the bag and pushed part way out the hole, a tip is slipped over the ring, then an outer ring is slipped over the tip and screwed onto the inner ring. Some inexpensive sets are of disposable plastic film with a drop-in ring and screw-on plastic tips (see image above). Many foods (including frosting and pressurized "spray can" whipped cream) can be purchased in disposable packaging designed to serve the function of a pastry bag.

== See also ==
- Pastry
- Pastry chef
