= Michela Ferriero =

Fashion brand from Italy

Michela Ferriero is a fashion brand from Italy. It is a bridal fashion label that specializes in custom-made wedding gowns. It is a family-owned business that originated at Atelier Pantheon, a maison with 40 years of experience. Now owned by Michela Ferriero and Antonio Ferriero and based in Grottaminarda.

== Wedding dress with the most crystals ==
Michela Ferriero is a young Italian couturier of bridal gowns. They presented a wedding dress at the Sì Sposaitalia Collezioni fashion show adorned with 50,890 Swarovski crystals, setting a new guinness record on April 14, 2023, for the highest number of crystals on a wedding dress.

=== Background ===
The dress was fashioned by Michaela Ferriero, one of the co-founders, who conducted a thorough investigation to identify the suitable materials for realising the envisioned design. Following the selection of the design, the designer collaborated with a pattern maker and a proficient team of seamstresses to produce the dress. The dress features a form-fitting silhouette, a sweetheart neckline, and transparent fabric. The gloves are embellished with crystals to enhance the bridge's shimmering effect during movement.

The bodice of the dress, which would have to sustain thousands of crystals, was built with special care. Individual crystals were sewed onto the tulle base of the dress, the crystal fringes on the bodice, the gloves, and lastly the crystal chains on the back to create a cascade of light. 200 hours of labour went into delicately sewing each jewel.

== See also ==
- Cake dress
