= Icing (food) =

Food producing method that could be applied to many sweets

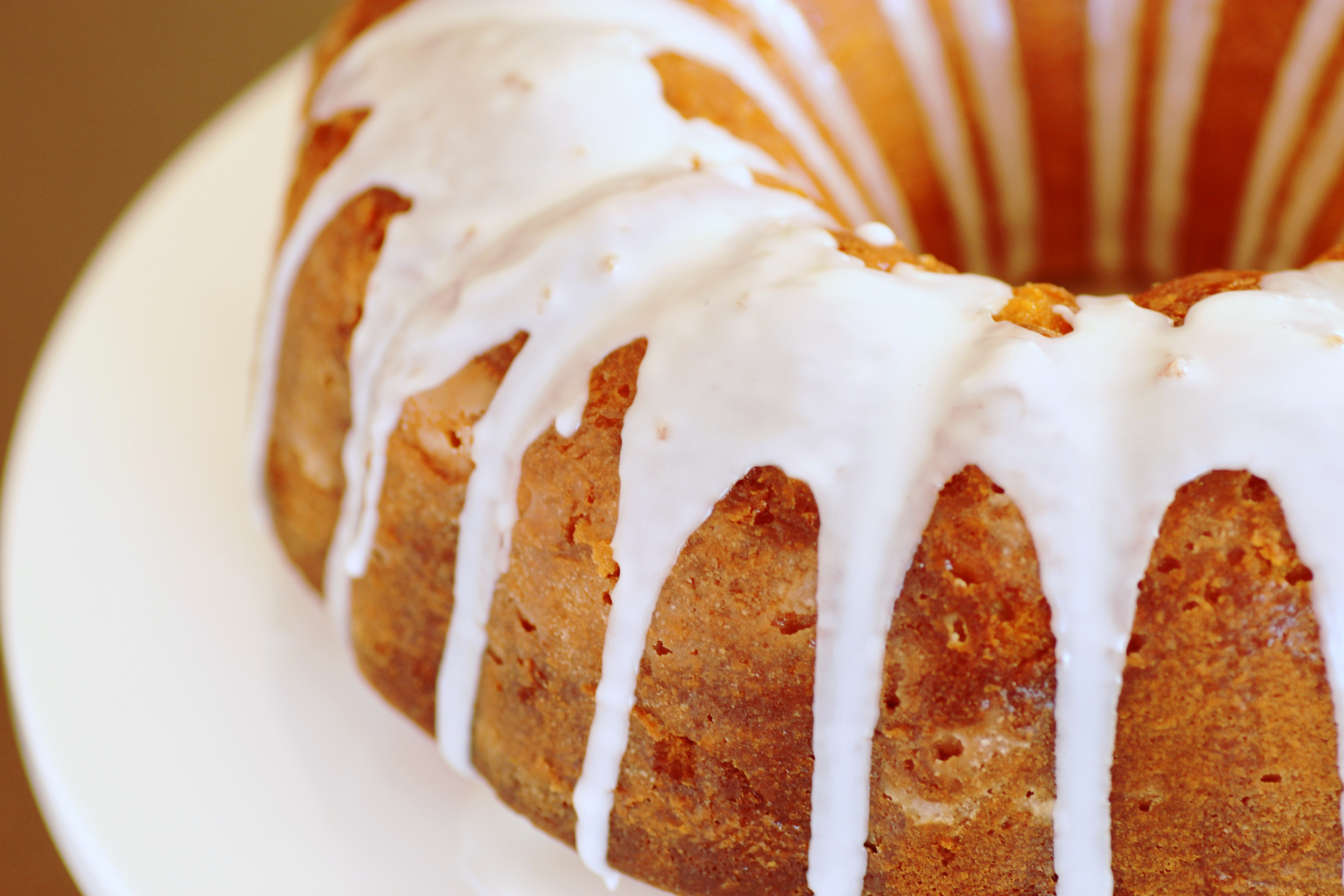
White glacé icing on a lemon bundt cake

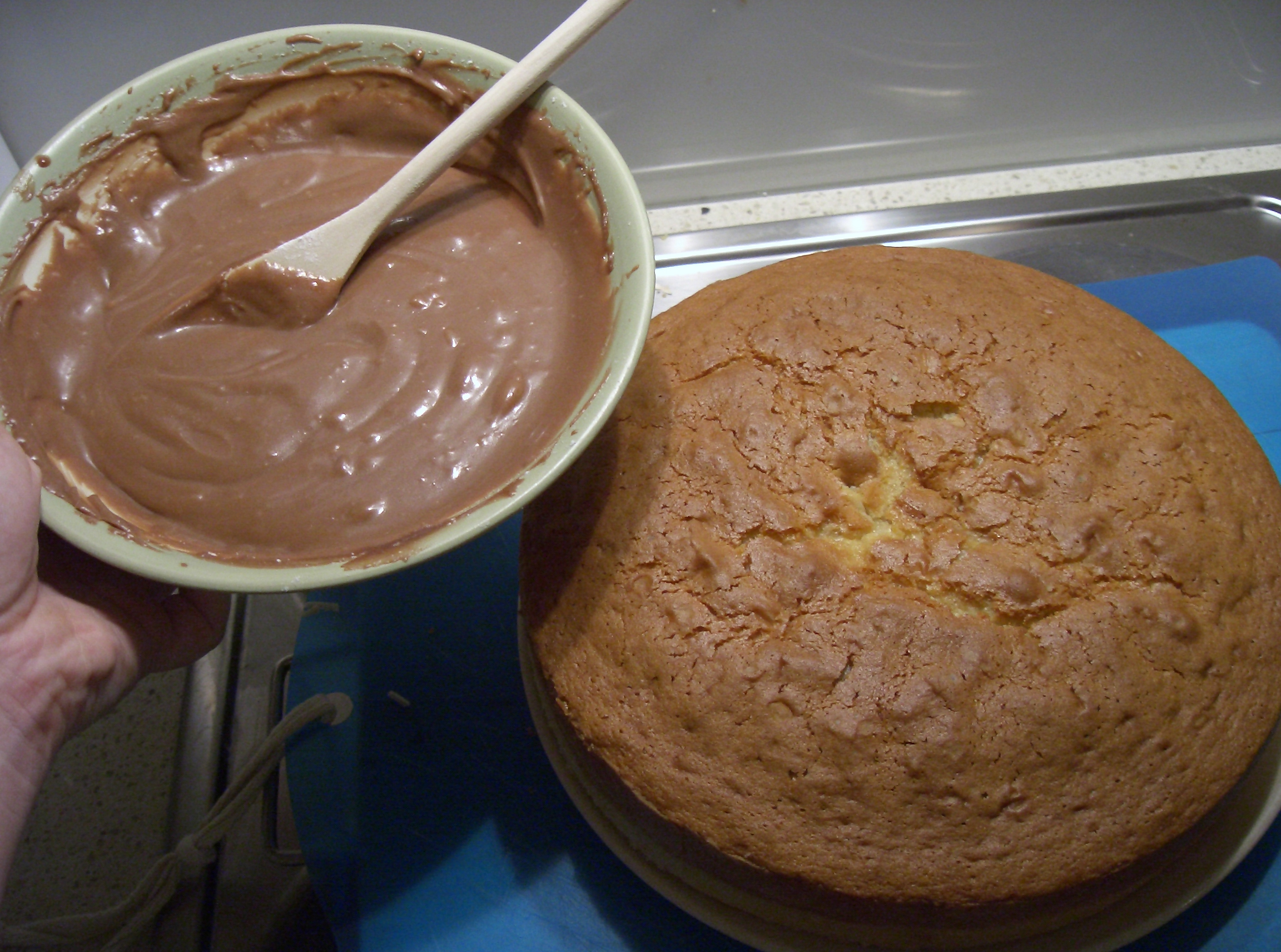
Chocolate icing in a bowl before being put on a cake

Icing is a sweet glaze, made of sugar with a liquid, such as water or milk, that is often enriched with ingredients like butter, eggwhites, cream cheese, or flavorings. It is used to coat or decorate baked goods, such as cakes, donuts, or honey buns. When it is used between layers of cake, it is known as a filling in some foods.

Icing can be formed into shapes such as flowers and leaves using a pastry bag. Such decorations are commonplace on birthday and wedding cakes. Edible dyes can be added to icing mixtures to achieve a desired hue. Sprinkles, edible inks or other decorations are often used on top of icing.

A basic icing is called a glacé, containing powdered sugar (also known as confectioners' sugar) and water. This can be flavored and colored as desired, for example, by using lemon juice in place of the water.

More complex icings can be made by beating fat into powdered sugar (as in buttercream), by melting fat and sugar together, by using egg whites (as in royal icing), by whipping butter into meringue (as in Italian or Swiss meringue buttercream), and by adding other ingredients such as glycerin (as in fondant) or dairy (as in ermine or cream cheese frosting).

Some icings can be made from combinations of sugar and cream cheese or sour cream, or by using ground almonds (as in marzipan).

Icing can be applied with a utensil such as a knife or spatula, or it can be applied by drizzling or dipping (see glaze), or by rolling the icing out and draping it over the cake. The method of application largely depends on the type and texture of icing being used. Icing may be used between layers in a cake as a filling, or it may be used to completely or partially cover the outside of a cake or other baked product.

Apart from its aesthetic functions, icing can also improve the flavor of a cake, as well as preserving it by sealing in moisture.

== History ==
Covering cakes with powdered sugar or other materials was introduced in the 17th century. The first documented case of frosting occurred in 1655, and included sugar, eggs and rosewater. The icing was applied to the cake then hardened in the oven. The earliest attestation of the verb to ice in this sense seems to date from around 1600, and the noun icing from 1683. Frosting was first attested in 1750.

== Types ==
- Buttercream, made primarily of sugar and butter
- Fondant icing, heated water and sugar, sometimes with gelatin-like stabilizers
  - Rolled fondant is rolled out like sugar cookies; a stiffer version can be used like sugar paste for three-dimensional sculptural modeling.
  - Poured fondant is a thin, pourable glaze.
- Ganache, melted chocolate and cream
- Powdered sugar glacé, a simple glaze made from powdered sugar and a small amount of liquid (e.g., water). It may be poured, drizzled, spread, or, in thicker versions, piped.
- Meringue, cooked egg white and sugar.
  - Some icings, such as Italian meringue buttercream, are meringues with butter added, in which case they are classified as buttercreams.
  - Seven-minute frosting is a soft meringue. It does not store well.
- Royal icing, uncooked egg white and sugar. Dries hard and keeps for months.
- Whipped cream, may be used for decorating cakes. It does not store well.
- Ermine frosting, or boiled milk frosting, involves cooking flour and sugar with milk to make the frosting base. It is stable frosting making it suitable for cake decorating and is considered less sweet than buttercream.

== Cake decorating ==
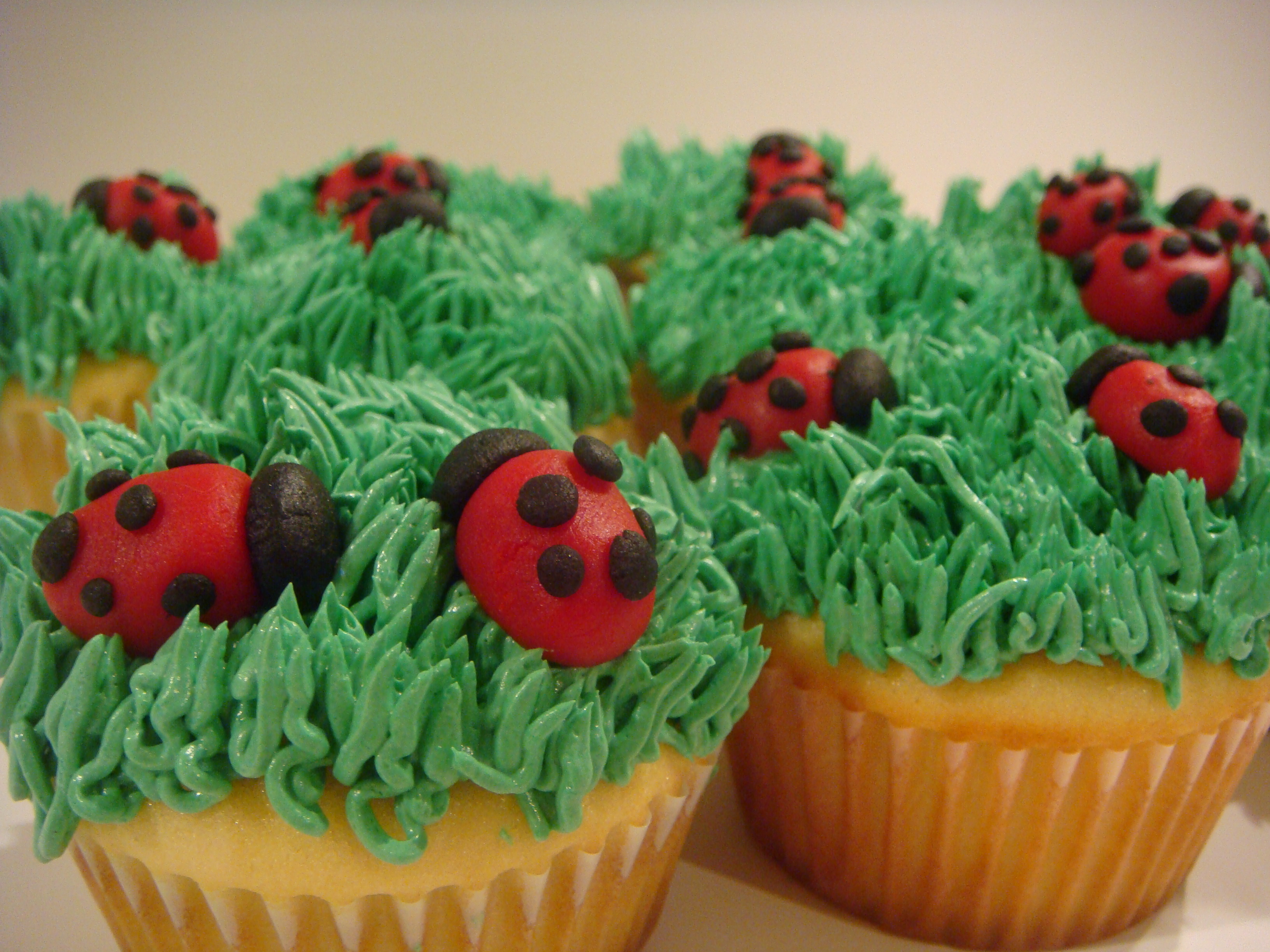
Cupcakes decorated with green buttercream frosting

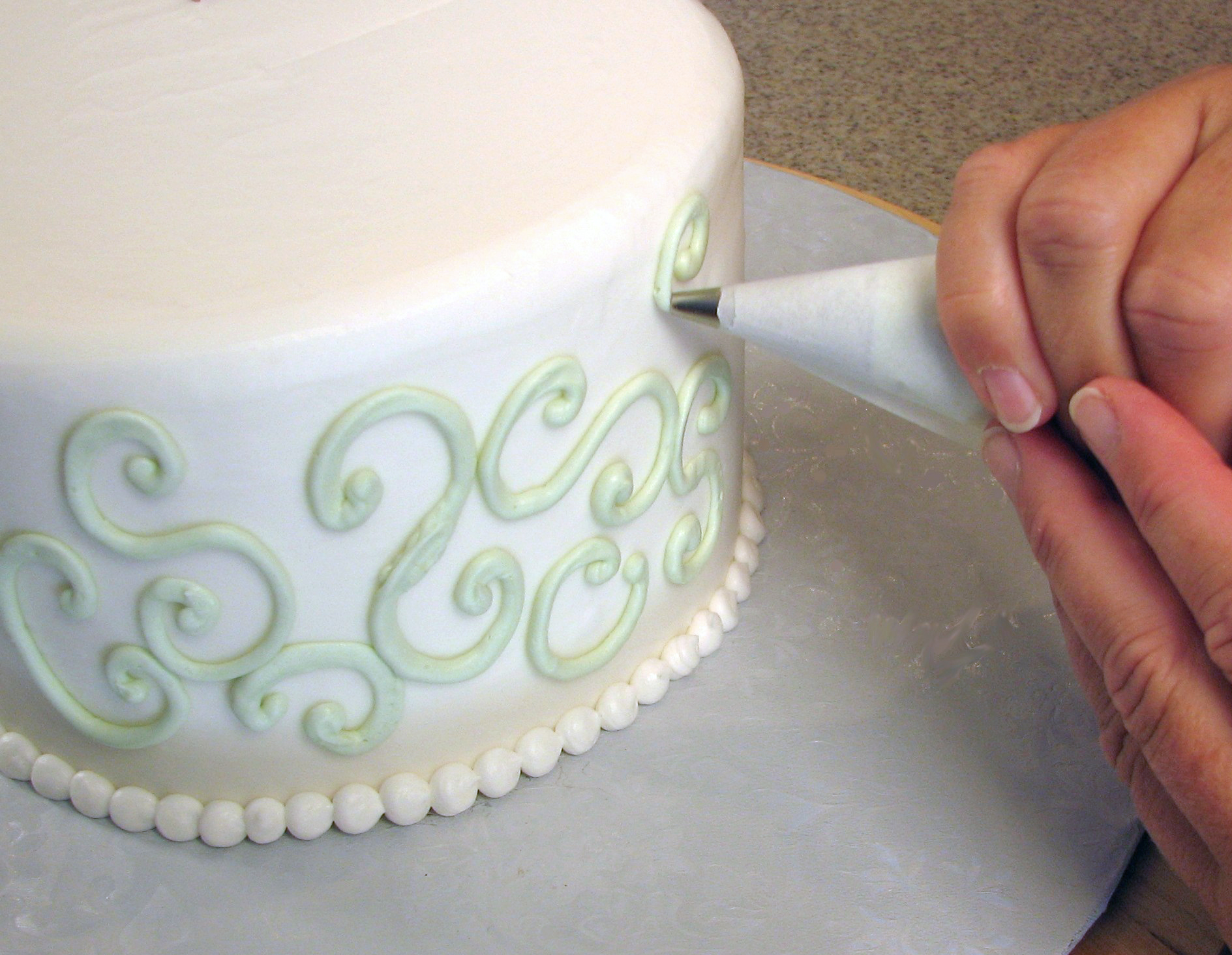
Buttercream decorations being added

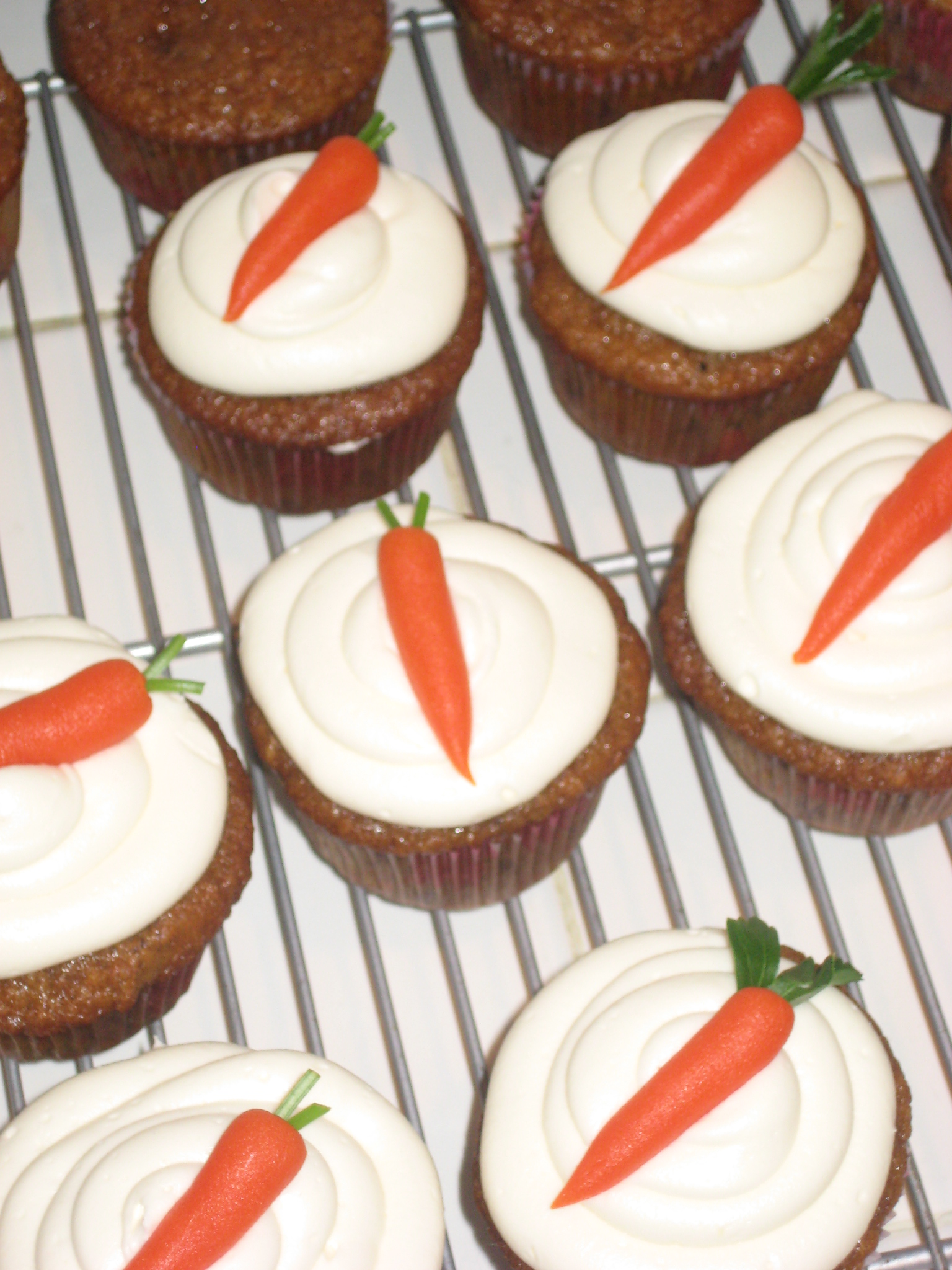
Carrot cupcakes with cream cheese frosting

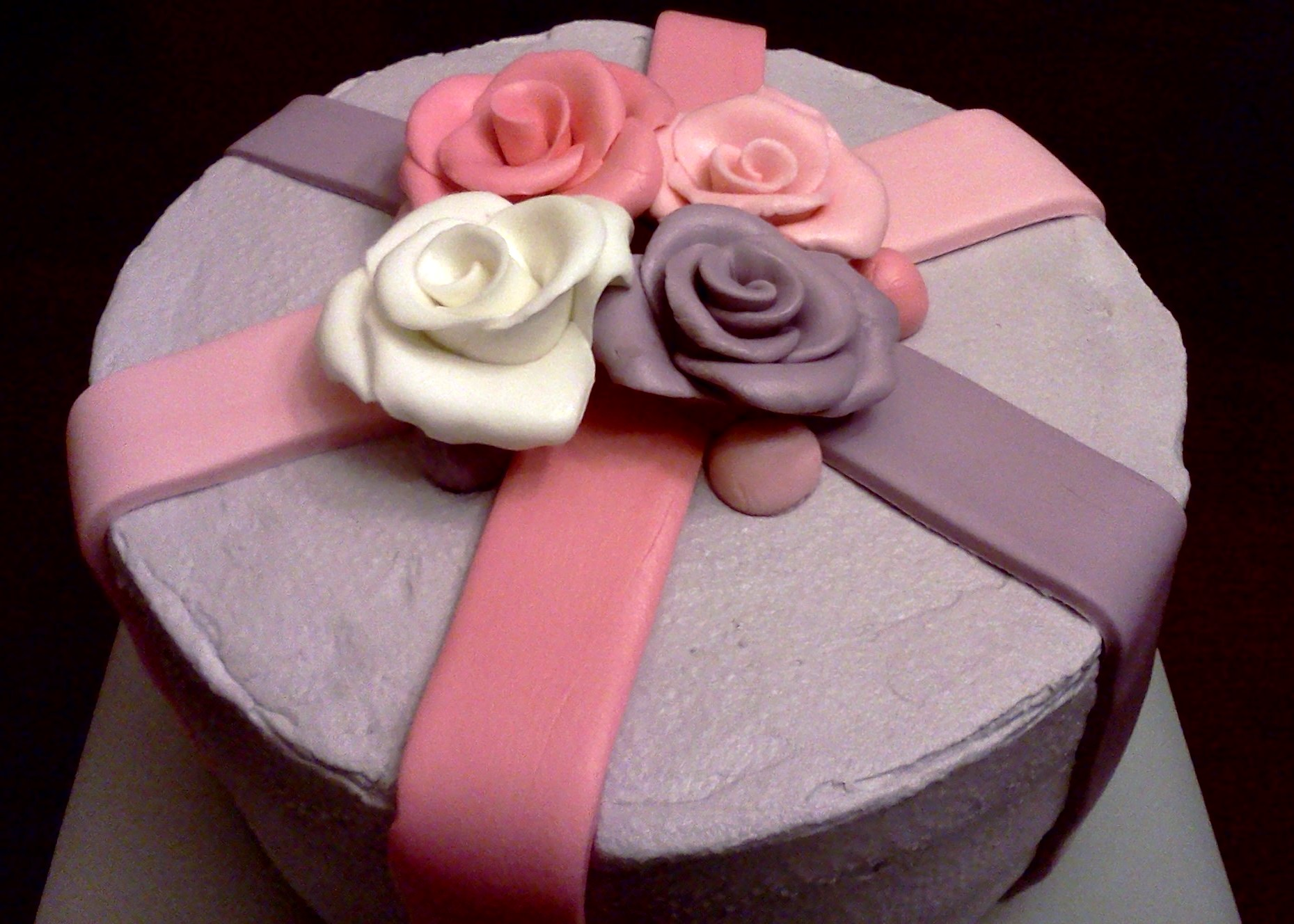
Rolled fondant with sculpted fondant roses

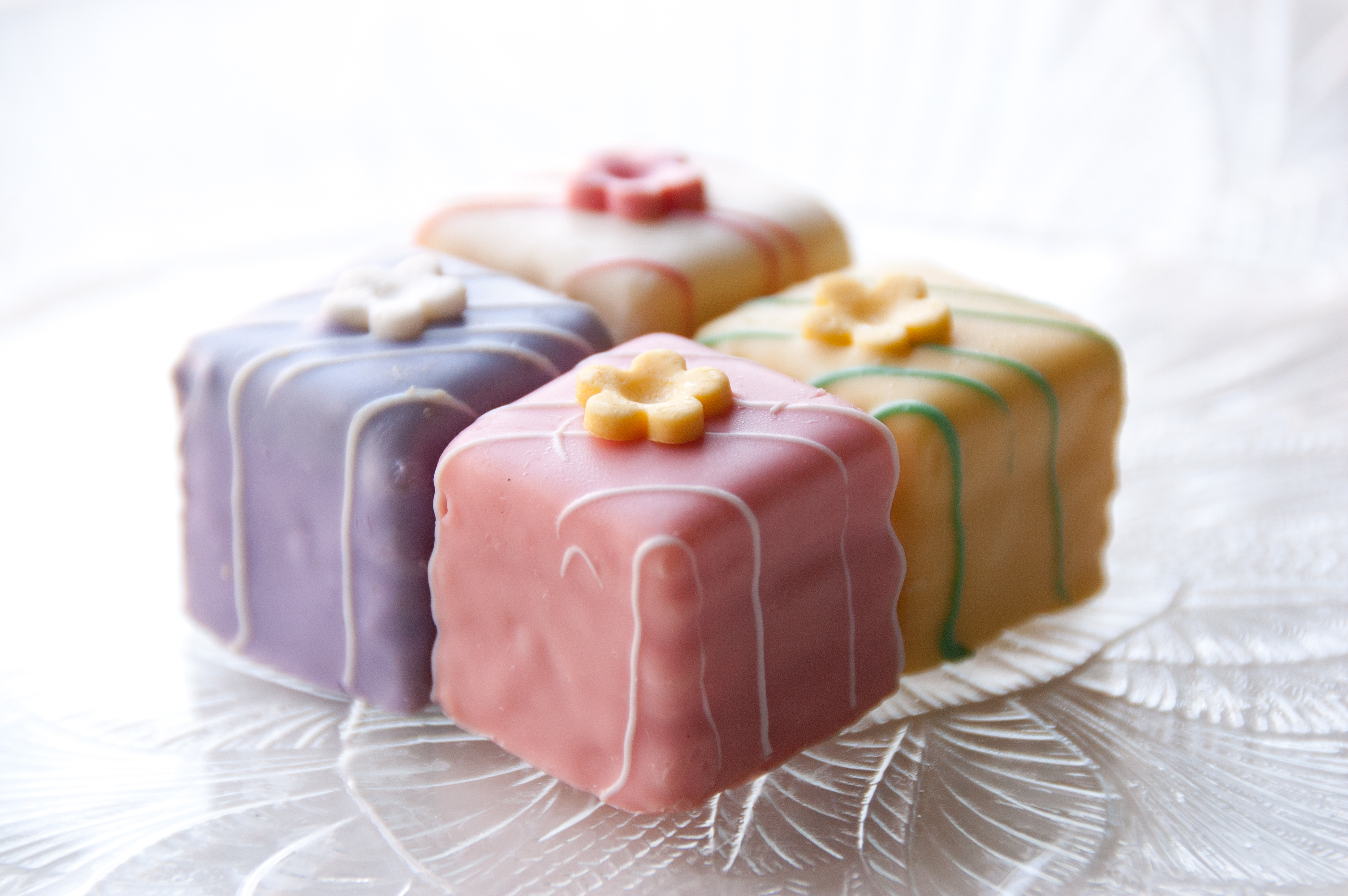
Poured fondant on petit fours

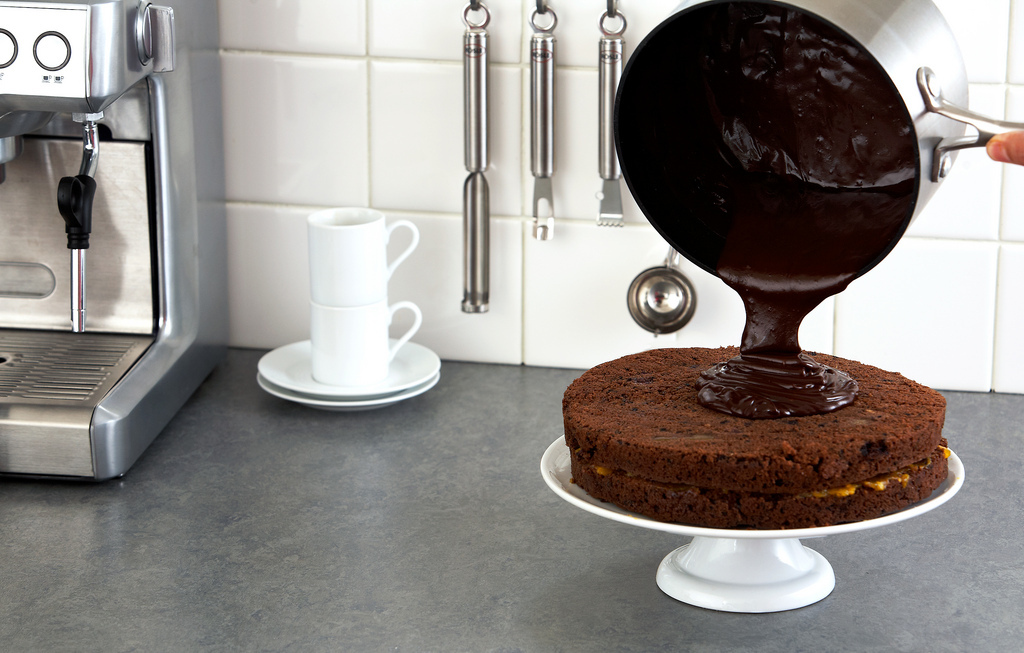
Chocolate ganache being poured onto a cake

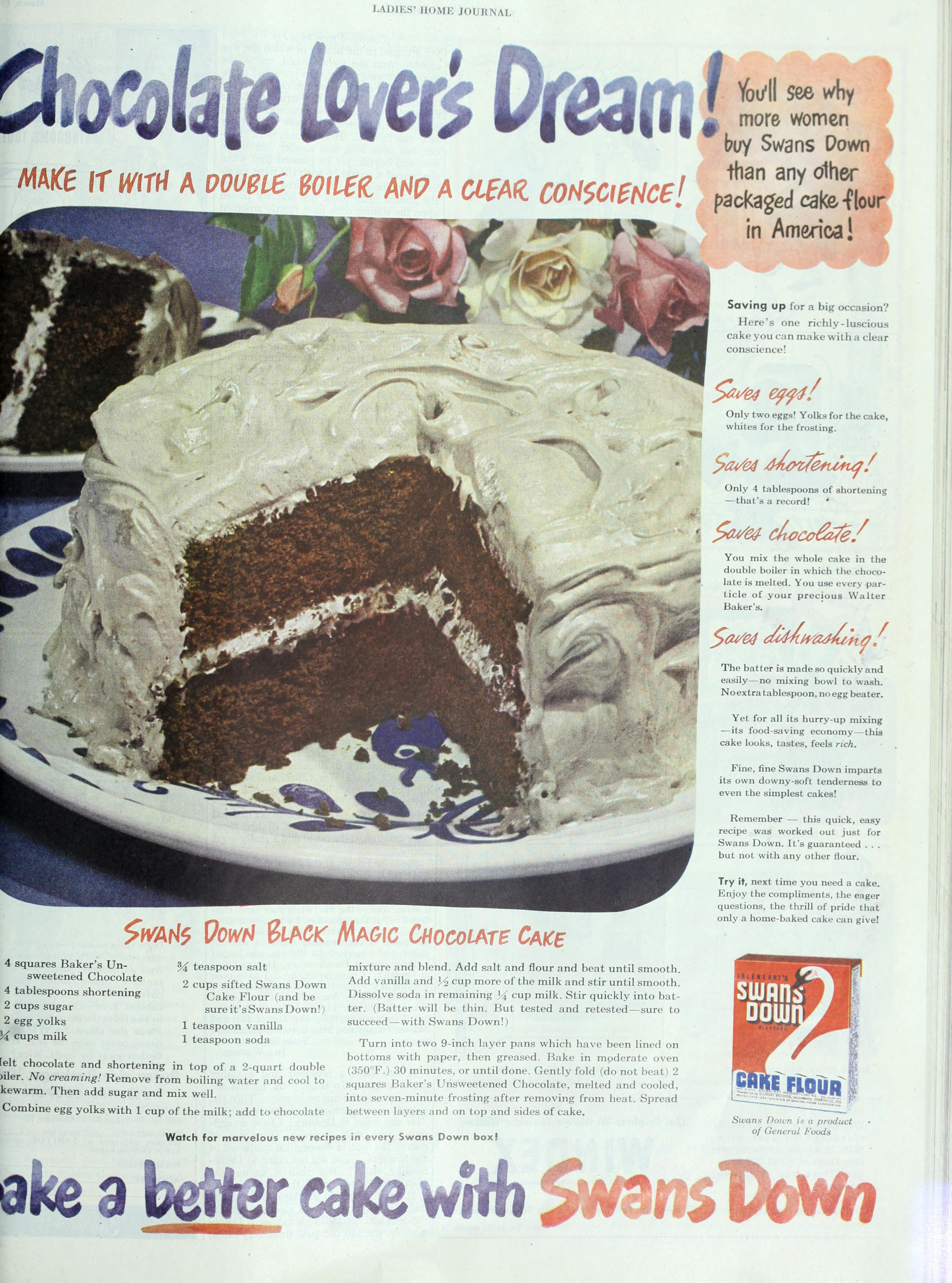
Advertisement showing chocolate cake with seven-minute frosting

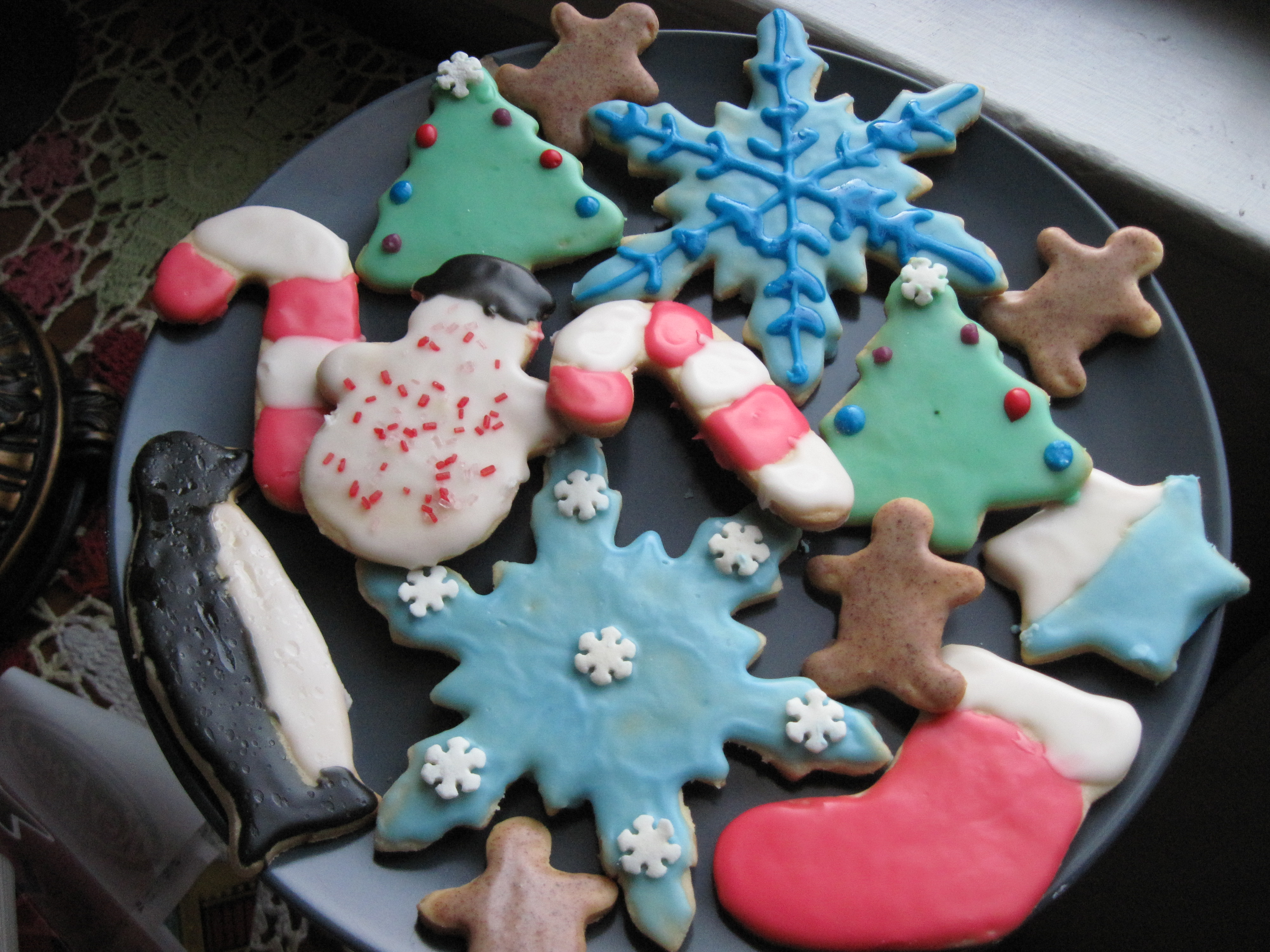
Christmas cookies decorated with powdered sugar glaze

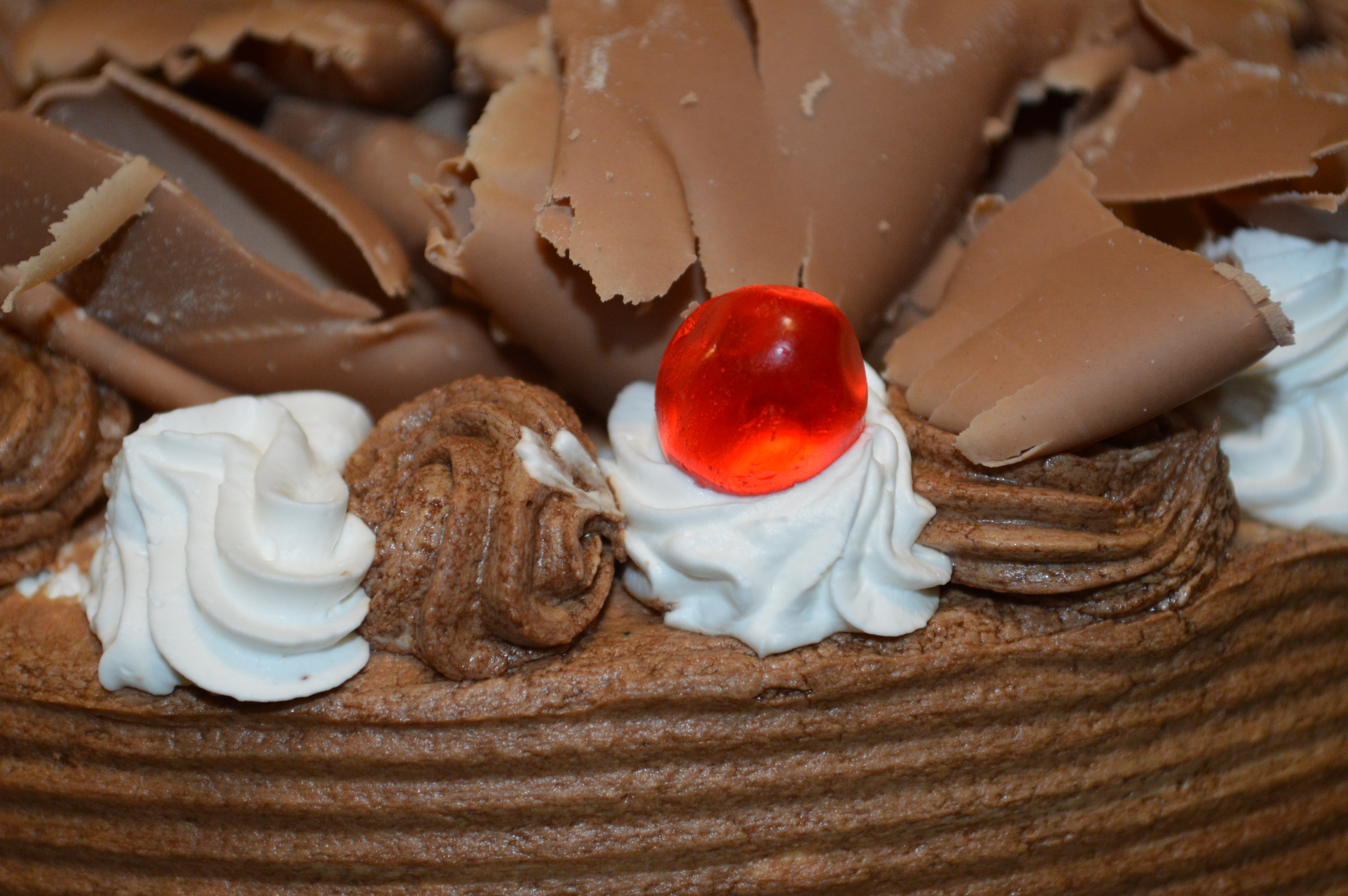
Chocolate truffle cake with icing and whipped cream

== See also ==
- Marzipan, ground almonds and sugar
- Couverture chocolate, a high cocoa butter chocolate
- Glazing
