= Wedding reception =

Party after a wedding

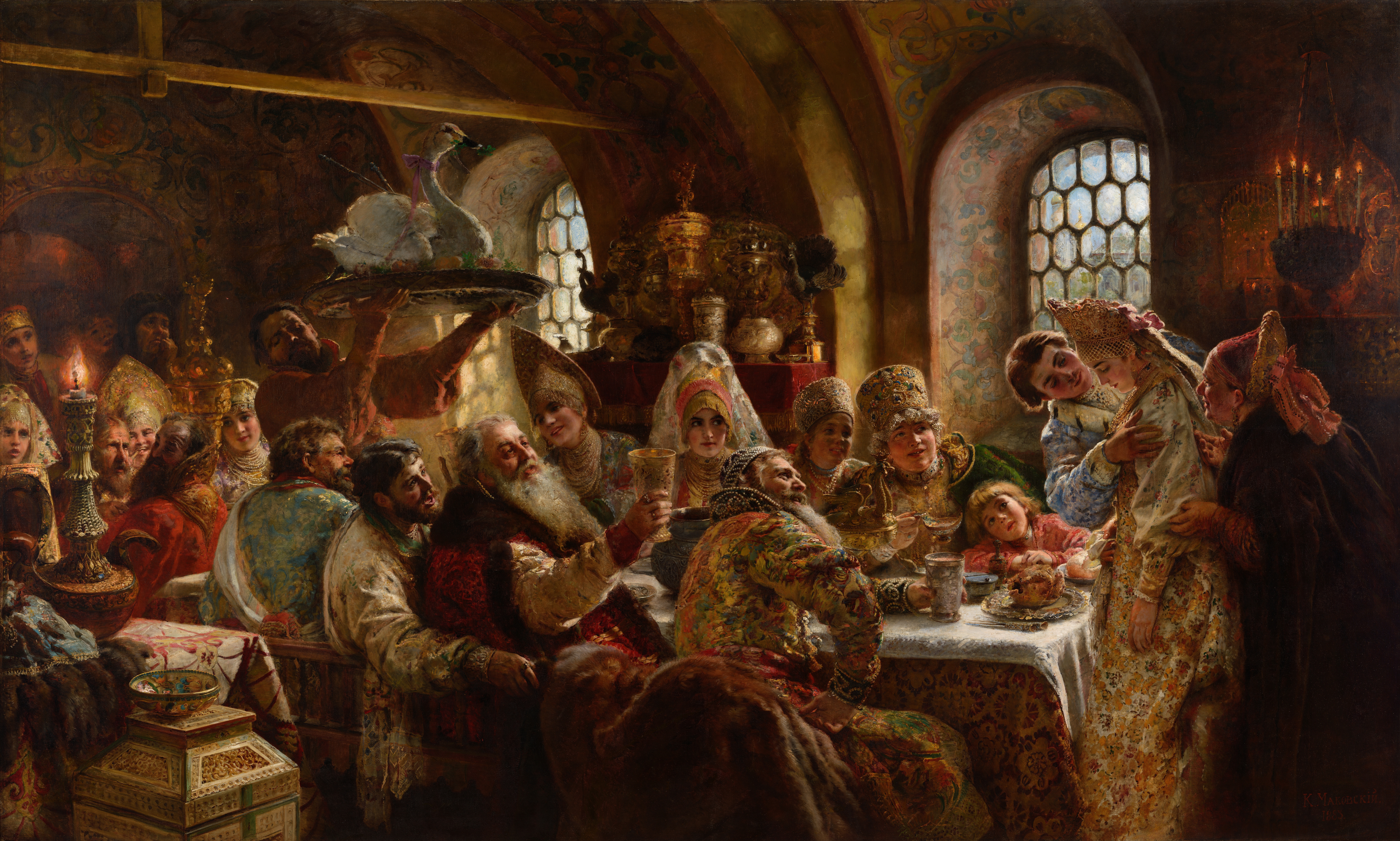
Wedding reception in 17th-century Russia by Konstantin Makovsky

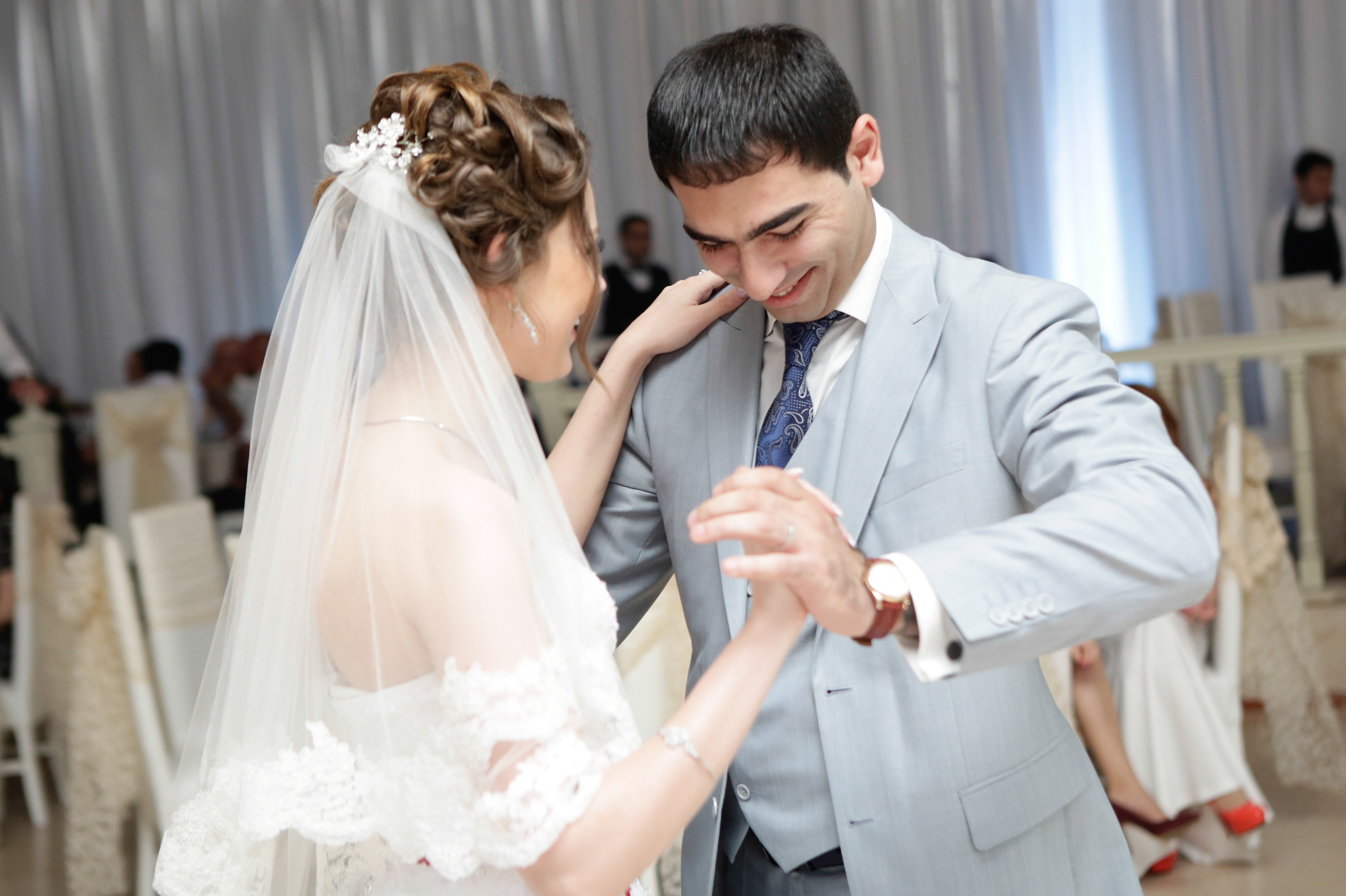
Wedding dance of an Azerbaijani married couple

A wedding reception is a party usually held after the completion of a marriage ceremony as hospitality for those who have attended the wedding, hence the name reception: the couple receive society, in the form of family and friends, for the first time as a married couple. Hosts provide their choice of food and drink, although a wedding cake is popular.

Entertaining guests after a wedding ceremony is traditional in most societies, and can last anywhere from half an hour to many hours or even days. Most wedding receptions are made in the evening for dinner; however, the couple may opt for a luncheon, brunch, or even afternoon tea. Ultimately the married couple chooses the details and location of the reception.

In some cultures, separate wedding celebrations are held for the bride's and groom's families.

Before receptions – a social event that is structured around a receiving line, and usually held in the afternoon, with only light refreshments – became popular, weddings were more typically celebrated with wedding breakfasts (for those whose religious traditions encouraged morning weddings) and wedding balls (for those who were married in the evening). The popularity of receptions, rather than breakfasts, dinners, and balls, during the 20th century led to the name reception being applied to any social event after a wedding, whether it is brunch, tea, dinner, or a dance.

== Western culture ==
=== Location ===
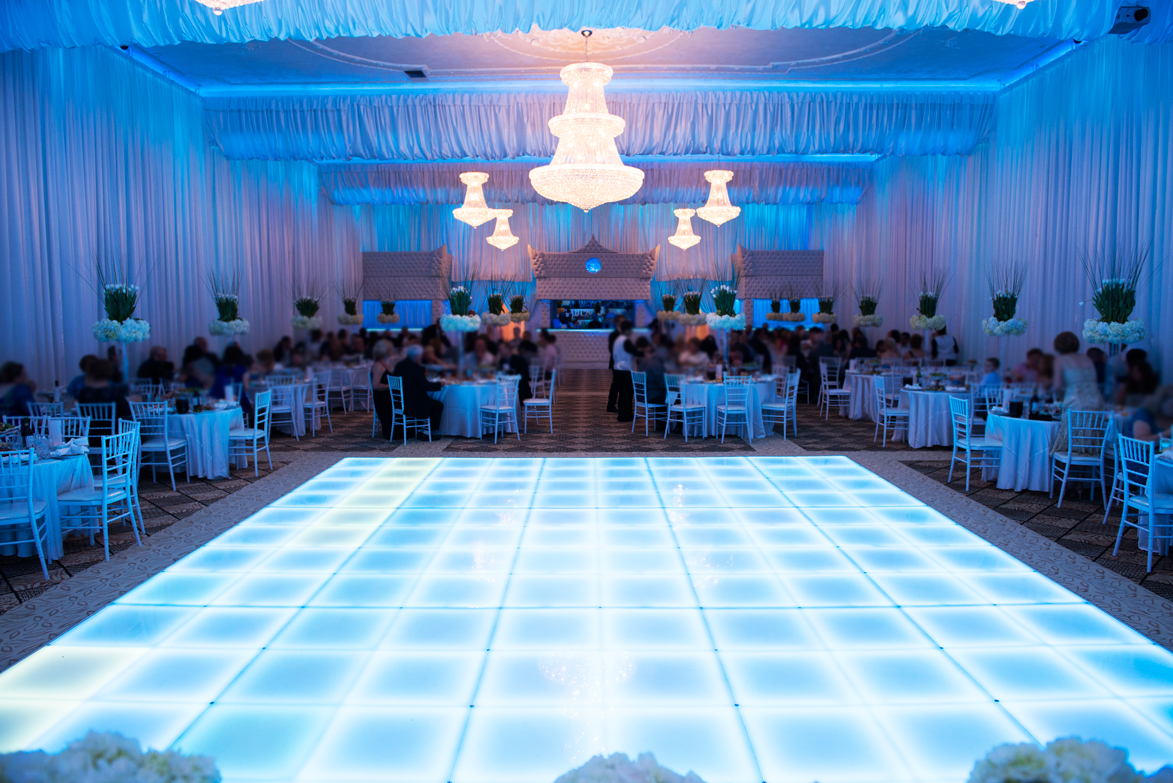
Banquet hall being used for wedding reception

Until after World War II, wedding celebrations were most commonly held in the bride's home, in whatever style of entertainment was within the means of the family. This might be a grand ball for a wealthy family, a luncheon for middle-class families, or an afternoon tea, featuring cake and lemonade, for working-class families.

The choice depended primarily on the family's economic situation, and in some cases, mass weddings were favored as a way to share costs. At the beginning of the 20th century, dance halls became common, and were rented by those planning a celebration beyond what their homes could hold.

Typical locations for wedding celebrations now include hotel ballrooms, banquet halls, wedding venues, community halls, social halls at the church or other sacred place where the wedding ceremony took place, and, particularly for smaller weddings, restaurants and garden parties at home. There are also many small businesses that specialize in providing places for wedding ceremonies and celebrations.

=== Receiving line ===
In a receiving line, newly wedded couple, the hosts, and often their parents and any honour attendants, stand in order of precedence and greet every guest in turn.

Each guest greets the first (lowest precedence) person in the line and, if necessary, introduces him/herself. The first person then introduces the guest to the next person in the line, and turns to the next guest. As each guest properly speaks little more than his/her name (if necessary) and conventional greetings or congratulations to each person in turn, the line progresses steadily without unnecessary delays.

Western etiquette requires at least one of the hosts and the newly married couple, as the guests of honor, to welcome and greet the guests, but the other members of the wedding party, parents who are not hosting the party, siblings, etc., are not required to stand in the receiving line. It is increasingly common to feature only the couple, since more modern couples host and pay for their own weddings rather than their parents.

After formally receiving each guest in this fashion, the receiving line is finished and the people who had been duty-bound to stand in it can mingle with guests, eat, and enjoy more extended conversations.

=== Grand entrance ===
Another option, especially popular on the East and West Coast of the United States, is having a grand entrance instead of a receiving line. The grand entrance might involve presenting some or all of the wedding party, the parents, and/or the bride and groom.

The wedding party is usually introduced by a master of ceremonies, toastmaster, disc jockey, or band leader. It may be done in the same manner as they walked down the aisle during the wedding ceremony. This is generally much faster than a receiving line and guests may be seated before the arrival of the wedding party. In addition, it can be an event in itself and be as entertaining as wished. Introductions may be accompanied by music and information about each person to introduce them to the guests. However, unlike a reception line, it does not give the guests an opportunity to speak to any of the people being presented.

=== Food ===
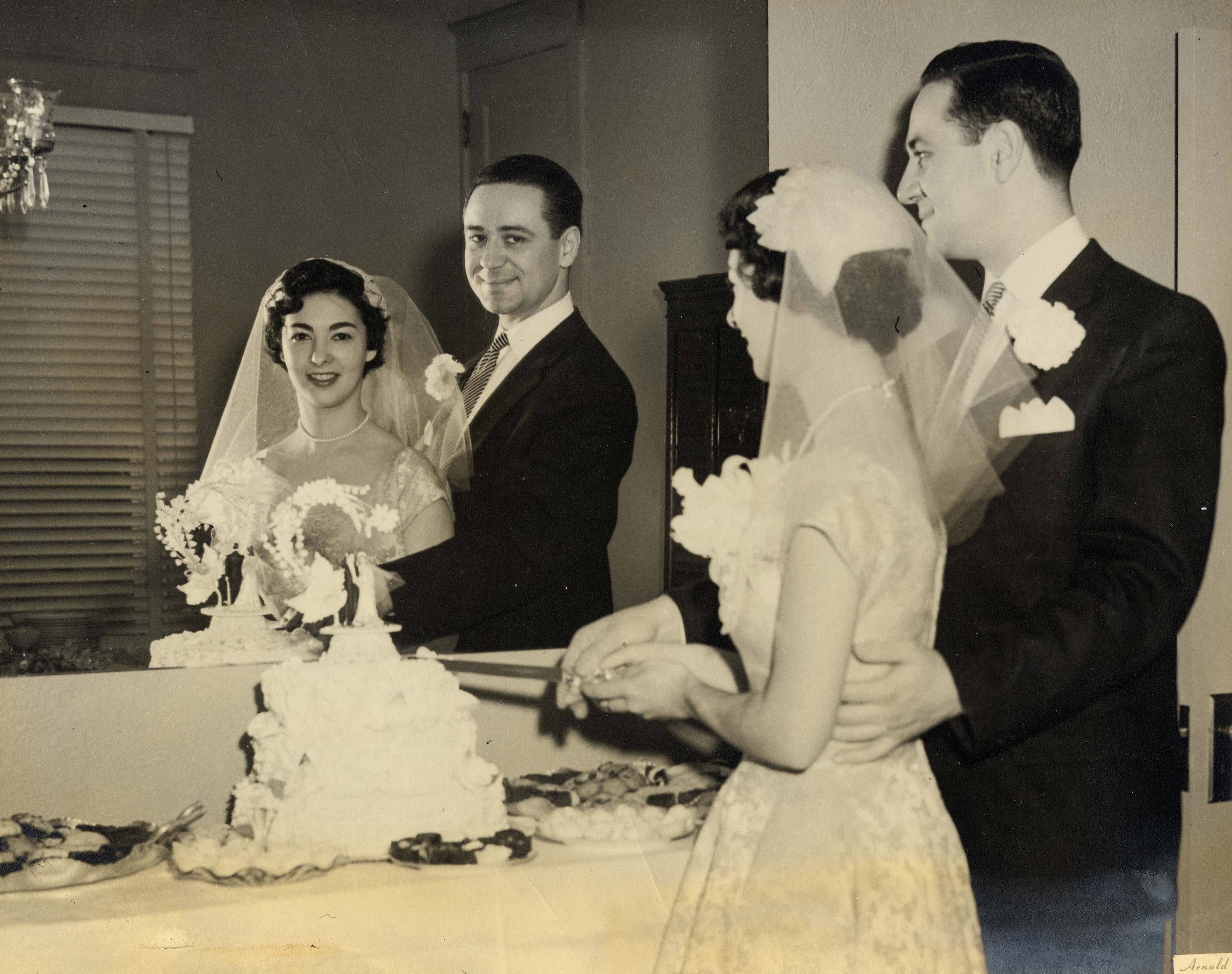
The bride and groom cut the wedding cake at an American wedding reception in 1955.

The food served at a wedding reception is determined by the time of the wedding and local customs. Food may range from a non-alcoholic drink with wedding cake to elaborate, multi-course dinners. The type of food is chosen entirely at the discretion and budget of the hosts as costs for catering weddings have soared.

Some receptions, especially if the wedding party's culture or religious faith prohibits alcohol or dancing, focus on dessert. Hosts may also choose to honor regional or local customs, such as by serving a culturally important cake like croquembouche in France, or featuring a cookie table as is celebrated in Pittsburgh and some surrounding areas.

The wedding cake is often a multi-tiered layer cake that is elaborately decorated with white frosting. Some couples have a smaller display cake, which is supplemented by sheet cake.

The groom's cake is a tradition observed mainly in the southern United States. In the Colonial and Victorian eras, the white-iced bride's cake was considered "too light" for male tastes, and a second cake choice – usually a dark, liquor-soaked fruitcake – was also offered. Today, chocolate is popular, although the groom's cake may be in any flavor and is usually shaped or decorated as something significant to the groom, such as a favorite hobby or sport.

If a full meal is served, the wedding cake is usually served after the meal. Otherwise, the cake may be served as soon as the family has received all of the guests.

Commonly, the couple ceremonially cut the first piece of the cake, and in a nod to an ancient Roman wedding rite, may feed a bite to one another and perhaps sip a glass of wine or other drink with linked arms. Then the cake is served to the guests. Like being asked to pour tea at a formal tea party, being asked to serve the cake is generally considered an honor.

=== Toasts ===
In most Western countries, either before or after food is served, toasts are made by members of the wedding party, wishing the couple well. Commonly, toasts are proposed by the bride's father, the groom, the best man, and/or the maid of honor, although there is no absolutely required list of people who must make toasts, or indeed any requirement to offer toasts at all.

A new trend involves the addition of a DVD slideshow or photo montage video, featuring pictures of the new spouses growing up and meeting. These are created using home movies and photos taken over the couple's life, edited and set to music. The montage is shown either on a large TV or monitor or with a video projector.

=== Dances ===
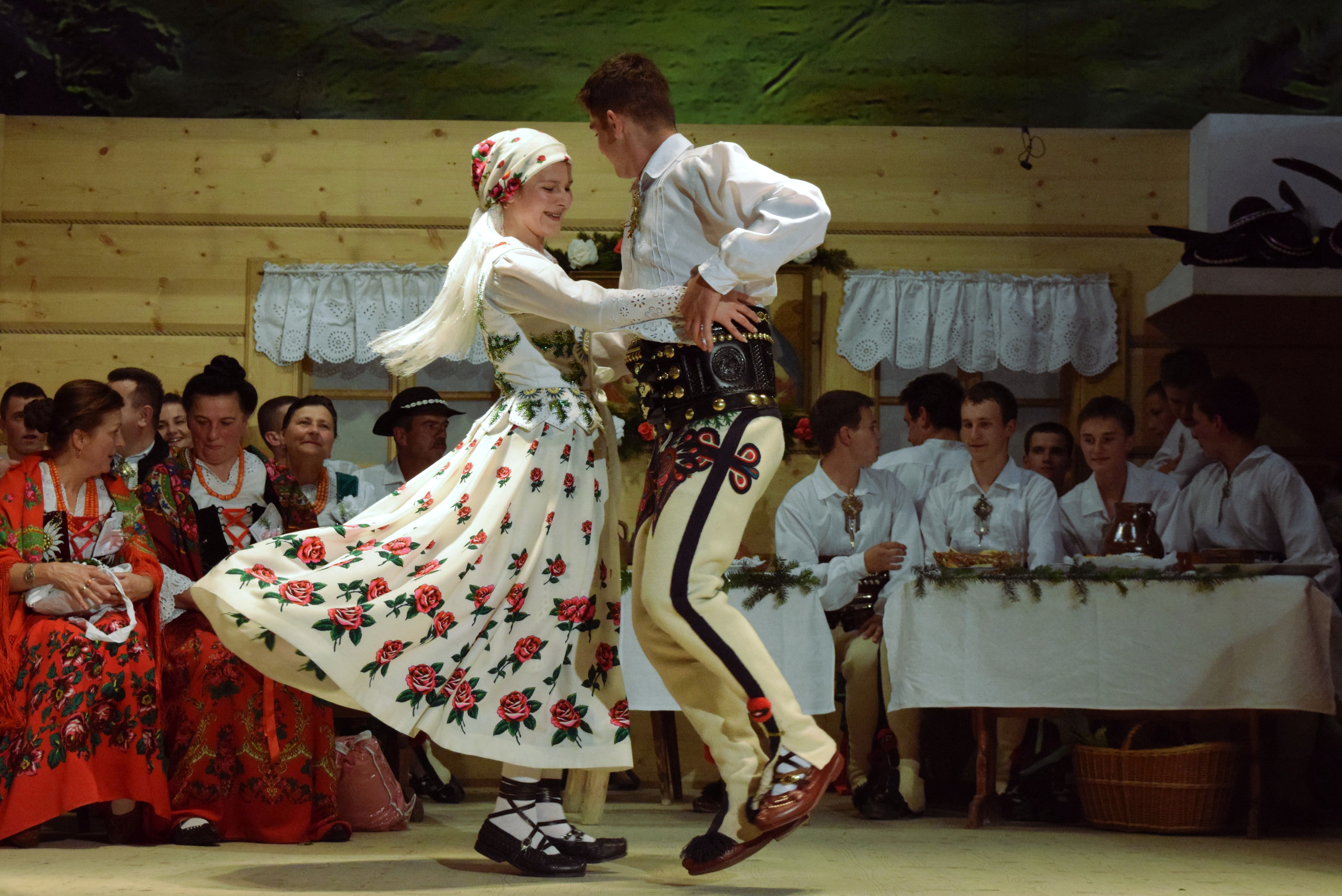
"A Gorals' Wedding" – bride and groom dance

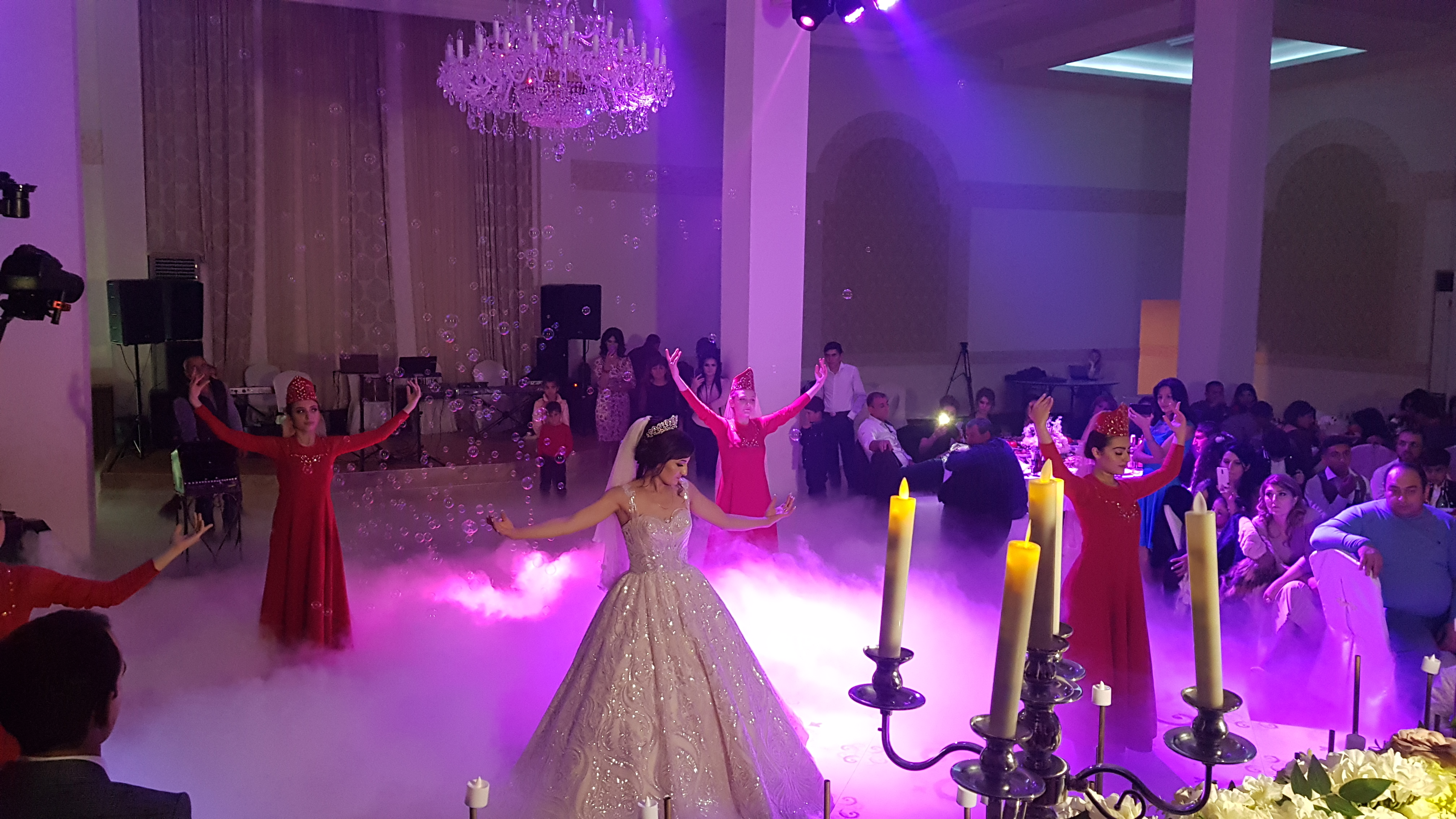
Armenian Wedding, Bride's Dance

If there is dancing, the newly married couple typically open the dancing with their first dance. When waltzing was popular, it was sometimes called a "bridal waltz" to a love song, although other dance styles are more commonly used now. The bride and groom might decide to choose a choreographed dance routine or other forms of dancing, like club, disco or hip hop.

Top 40 chart hits becoming an increasingly popular option for the first dance – the most popular first dance song at UK weddings in 2020 is You Got Me Thinking, a soft rock ballad by Joshua Radin. Before the wedding, the newlyweds choose a DJ and agree on a playlist with them. As a rule, the performance of the DJ takes place after the official traditional part.

Traditionally, shortly after the dance begins, guests would promptly join in the dancing, in order of precedence, exactly like at any other ball. In very recent times, some families have told guests to not start dancing until after watching a sometimes lengthy sequence of "special" dances. For example, after the first dance, the newly married couple might dance with their parents and/or in-laws. However, there is no requirement that any particular people dance at all, much less with any particular person, and no absolutely required order for the bridal couple, their families, or the bridal party to begin dancing in.

=== Entertainment ===
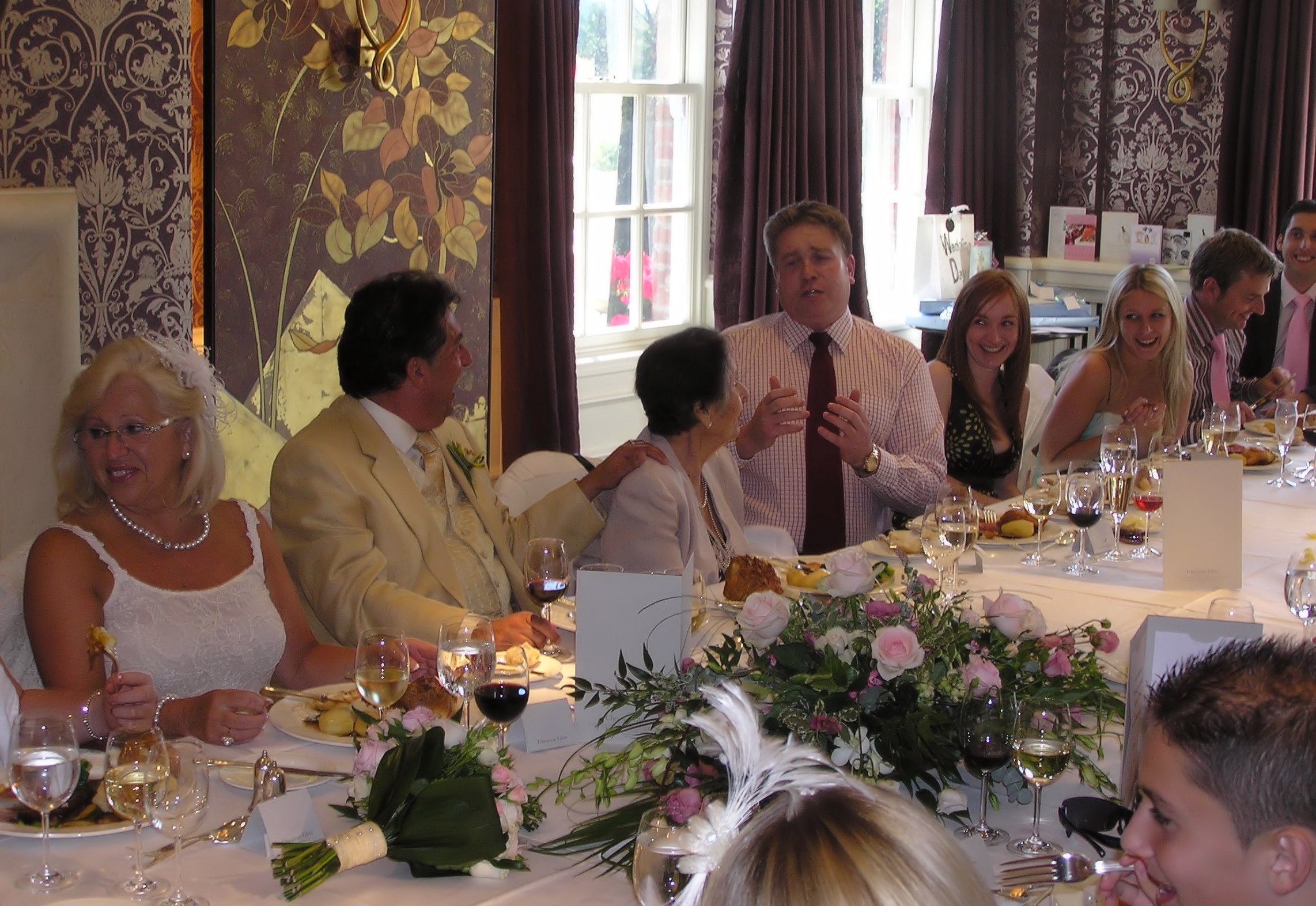
Entertainment at an English wedding reception. The organisers have hired two opera singers to sing arias during the meal for the entertainment of the guests. The mother of the groom is being serenaded.

Wedding receptions are often the time when couples want to ensure their family and guests will be entertained, and a variety of options such as disc jockeys, live bands, professional dancers such as ballroom dancers or belly dancers, magicians, fire artists, electric violinists, comedians and more unusual entertainers are brought in to heighten the festivities and make the wedding stand out.

Typically, including lavish entertainment at the wedding reception is a luxury. Wedding DJs have been increasing in popularity in modern cultures as has hiring a live band.

=== Departure ===
A ceremony is often made of the newlyweds' departure. Rice or birdseed, signifying abundance, may be thrown at the departing couple, with birdseed preferred by facility managers, since it requires less clean up work than rice, and new, mess-free substitutes, such as blowing soap bubbles or ringing small bells being even more favored by the cleaning staff.

As the newlyweds are the guests of honor, the other guests are expected to remain at the reception until they leave them, and consequently, it is an imposition on the other guests for the newlyweds to stay unreasonably long at the party. On occasion, the newlyweds will stage an official leave-taking, so that guests feel free to leave, and then quietly return through another door.

=== Expense ===
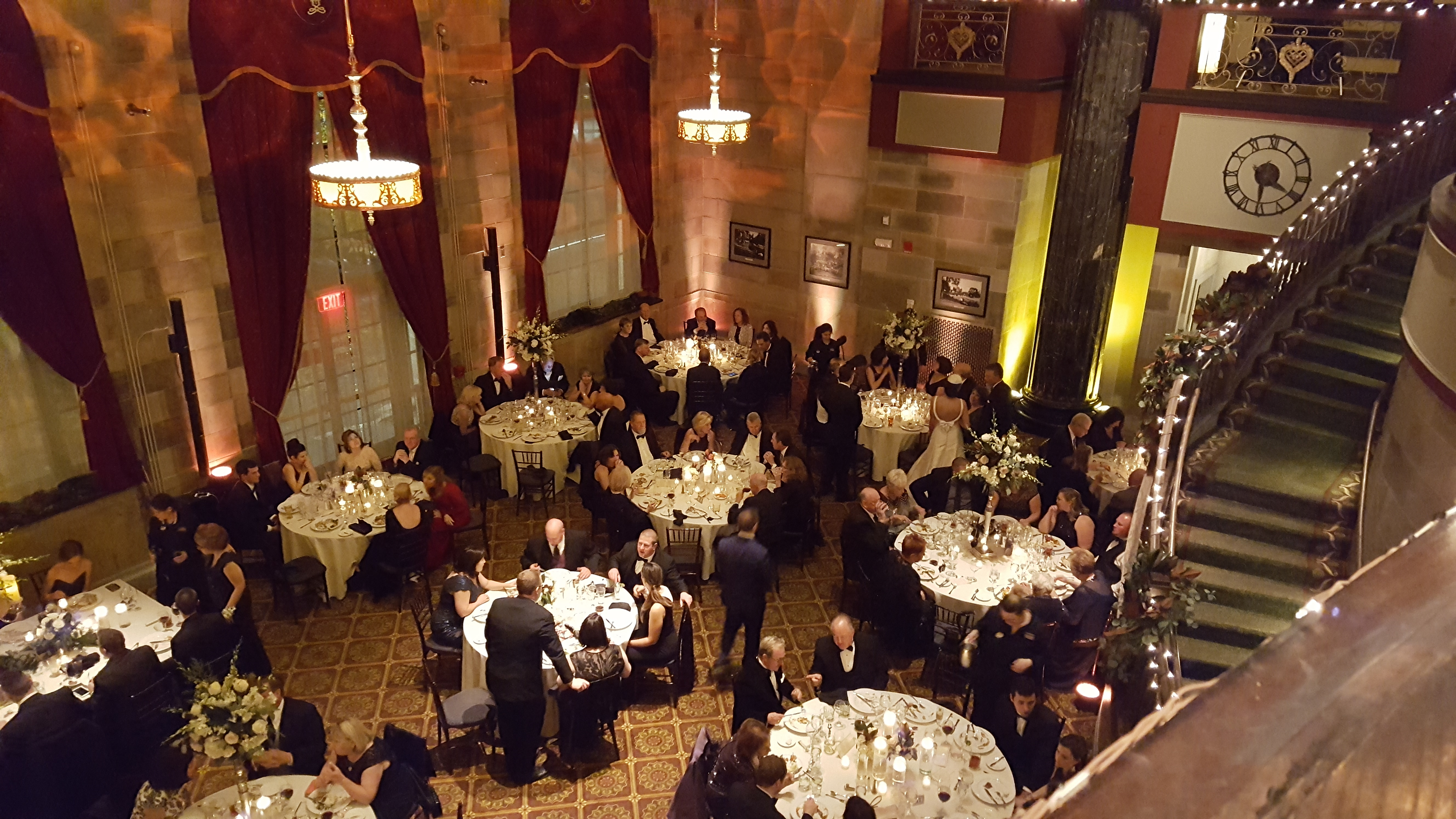
A black tie wedding reception held at the Society Room in Hartford, Connecticut

The median cost of a wedding, including both the ceremony and reception, has generally outpaced the rate of inflation. In the United States, as of 2016, the average price is $35,329, steadily rising year over year, as it also has in the UK where the average cost was £25,090, rising roughly 7000 pounds from two years prior. In Australia, the cost is $36,200 (AUD). Approximately 50% of a couple's entire wedding budget is spent on the reception alone. This is primarily due to the cost of food and alcohol. The wedding industry is a huge industry grossing $161 billion annually, according to Rebecca Mead, author of One Perfect Day.

=== Other Western traditions and beyond ===
Wedding traditions vary between countries, and between regions of the same country. Some shared traditions include:

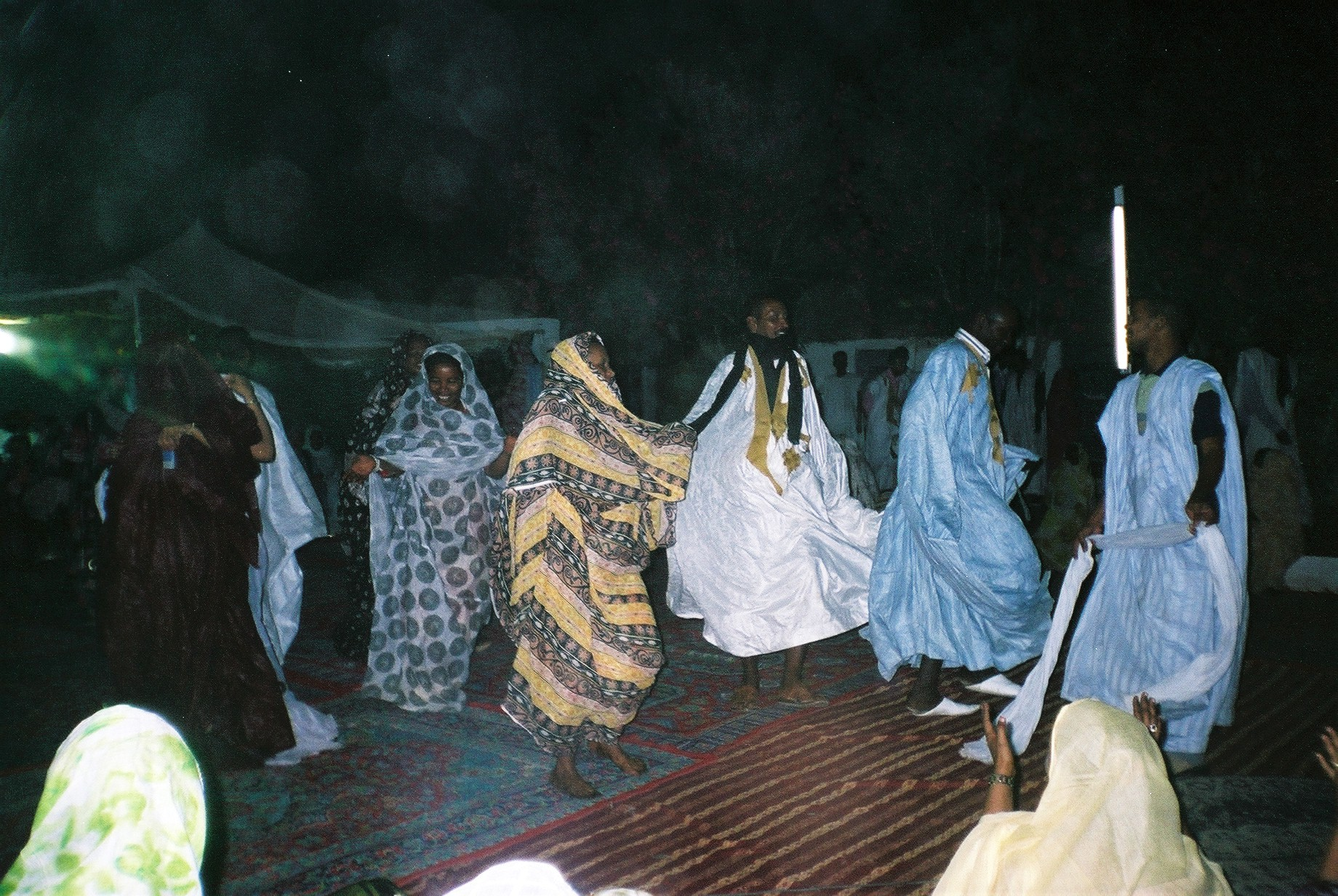
Dancing guests at a wedding party in Mauritania

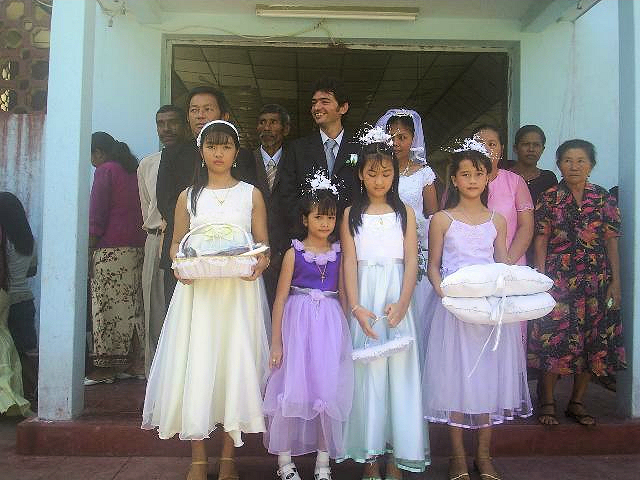
Ethnic Hakka people in a wedding in East Timor, 2006

- The money dance, or "dollar dance". Guests pay a small amount of money to dance with the bride or groom. In some cultures, the money is pinned to a special apron worn by the bride or groom. In others, the money is collected by friends. This is prevalent among Polish and Italian couples, although many other brides and grooms often incorporate it. There is considerable debate about the propriety of a money dance in English-speaking countries, where the practice is frowned upon because making guests pay for dancing or socializing with the bridal couple seems inhospitable, greedy, or distasteful. It is accepted when the couple and the majority of their guests are of one of the cultures in which it is traditional.
- Tossing of the bride's bouquet and garter. The bride tosses her bouquet over her shoulder to a group of all the single women present. Whoever catches it is supposed to be the next to get married. The masculine equivalent is the groom throwing a garter to the single men. This tradition is now less common in Western cultures, where some have argued it is old fashioned.
- Clinking glasses. Guests will often clink their glasses during dinner to ask the newlyweds to stand up and kiss. Some couples pass out wedding favor bells for guests to ring instead of clinking glasses.
- Favors. The hosts may provide a small gift for each guest. Favors may include chocolates, candles, picture frames, or other small gifts. Such favors are not required.

== Chinese traditions ==
=== Gifts ===
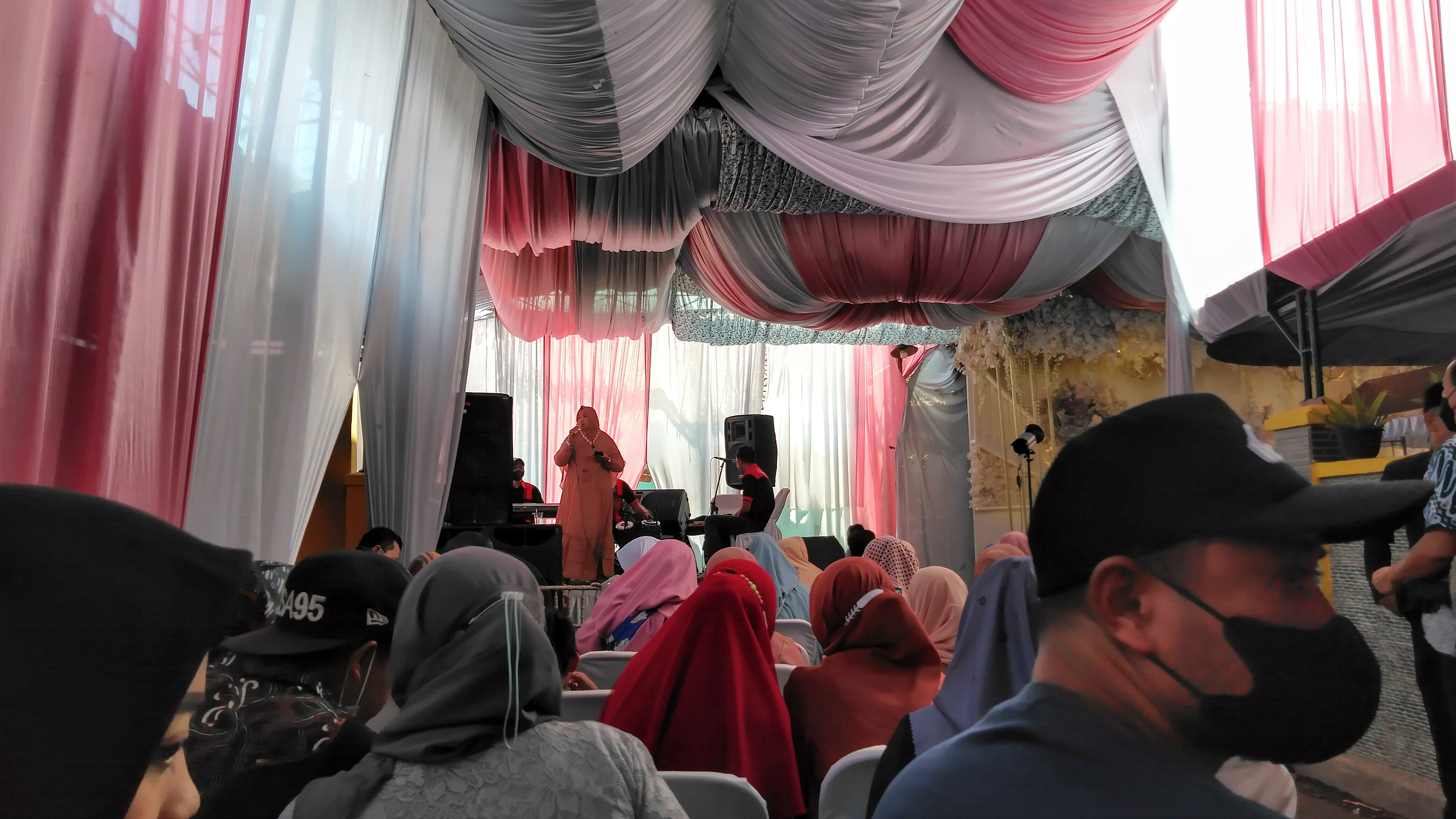
A typical wedding ceremony in Indonesia, complete with an orchestra on a stage, 2022. The audience is allowed to request a song to be sung by the orchestra, or they can come up to the stage and sing the song they want.

Unless the wedding couple has a wedding registry, it is best not to give gifts or gift certificates. For Chinese weddings, cash or a check is the traditional gift. (Traditional Italian weddings similarly include cash gifts.) The check should be in a red envelope or red pocket with the givers' names on it, and it is always given when signing in at the restaurant. In choosing the amount of money to give, givers scrupulously avoid unlucky numbers, such as 4 and favor combinations of lucky numbers, such even numbers, numbers with 8 (homonym with "fortune") and 9 (homonym with "longevity" – as in, may your marriage enjoy longevity). Also, white envelopes are never used to wrap gifts for a wedding or other joyful event, as the color white is associated with death. In addition to the check, in Chinese weddings some elder relatives might also give gold jewelry.

=== Timing ===
There are two times listed on the invitation: 恭候 (gōnghòu/greeting) and 入席 (rùxí/reception). Typically, they are at least two hours apart (some may be four hours). The first one is the time the groom and bride, along with their family, will be ready to receive guests and greet them; the second one is the time the reception/banquet will start. The gap between those hours is referred to as entertainment time. Very often, the restaurant will provide poker and mahjong (麻將) for gambling; the time can also be used to socialize with other guests and take photos with the bride/groom and their families. Nowadays, for Chinese couples' weddings in the U.S., you are less likely to see mahjong being played before the banquet; it is often replaced by a cocktail party. However, if the wedding reception takes place in southern China, Hong Kong, Macau, and even parts of Canada (where there is a large Cantonese population), mahjong might still be played before the dinner.

=== Signing in ===
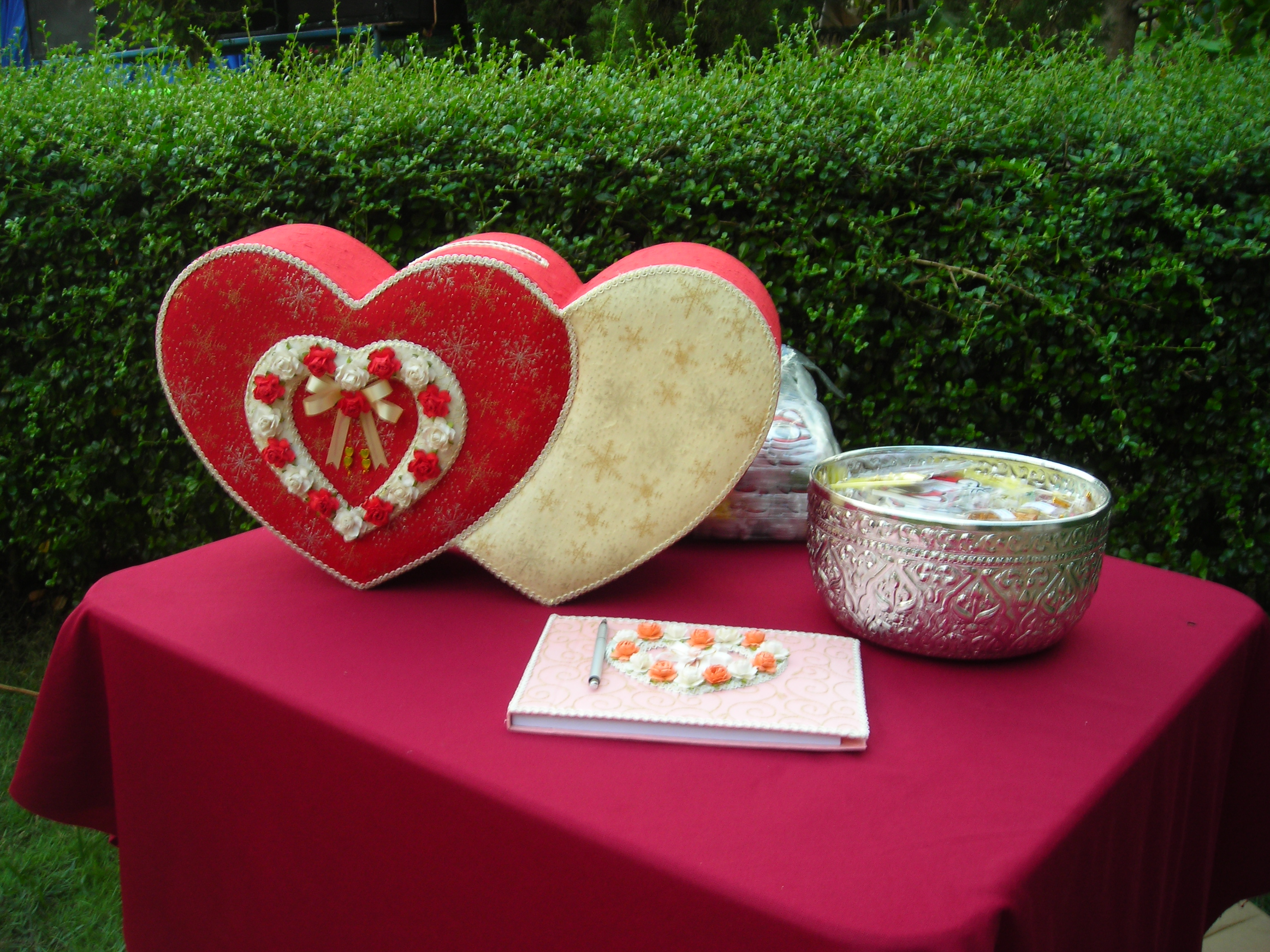
Gifts of money may be placed in a special box at the sign-in table.

Two people will be at the sign-in tables (one from the bride's family and one from the groom's) to register guests and receive gifts/red envelopes. Often, they will have two separate guest lists, one from the groom's side and one from the bride's. Then the best man and the maid of honor will direct ushers to escort guests to their seat.

=== Banquet procedure ===
Typically, the banquet will include a speech from the parents, the best man, the maid of honor, and the guest speaker. There will be cake cutting, toasts, a tea ceremony, and dancing. The two tables at the center of the room are for the groom's and bride's families.

=== Traditions ===
A Chinese wedding reception typically has nine or ten courses. Expensive dishes such as shark fin, abalone, lobster, jumbo shrimp, squab, sea bass, or sea cucumber are common on a wedding banquet menu. A whole fish, chicken, or pig means luck and completeness in Chinese wedding culture.

Traditionally, after the fifth dish of the dinner, the groom and bride and their families will approach each table to toast the guests. Very often, the bride will change into a traditional Chinese red wedding dress (鳳褂, or qípáo) at that time, if she has been wearing a different style of clothing before.

== Gallery ==
The decorations vary by culture and budget.

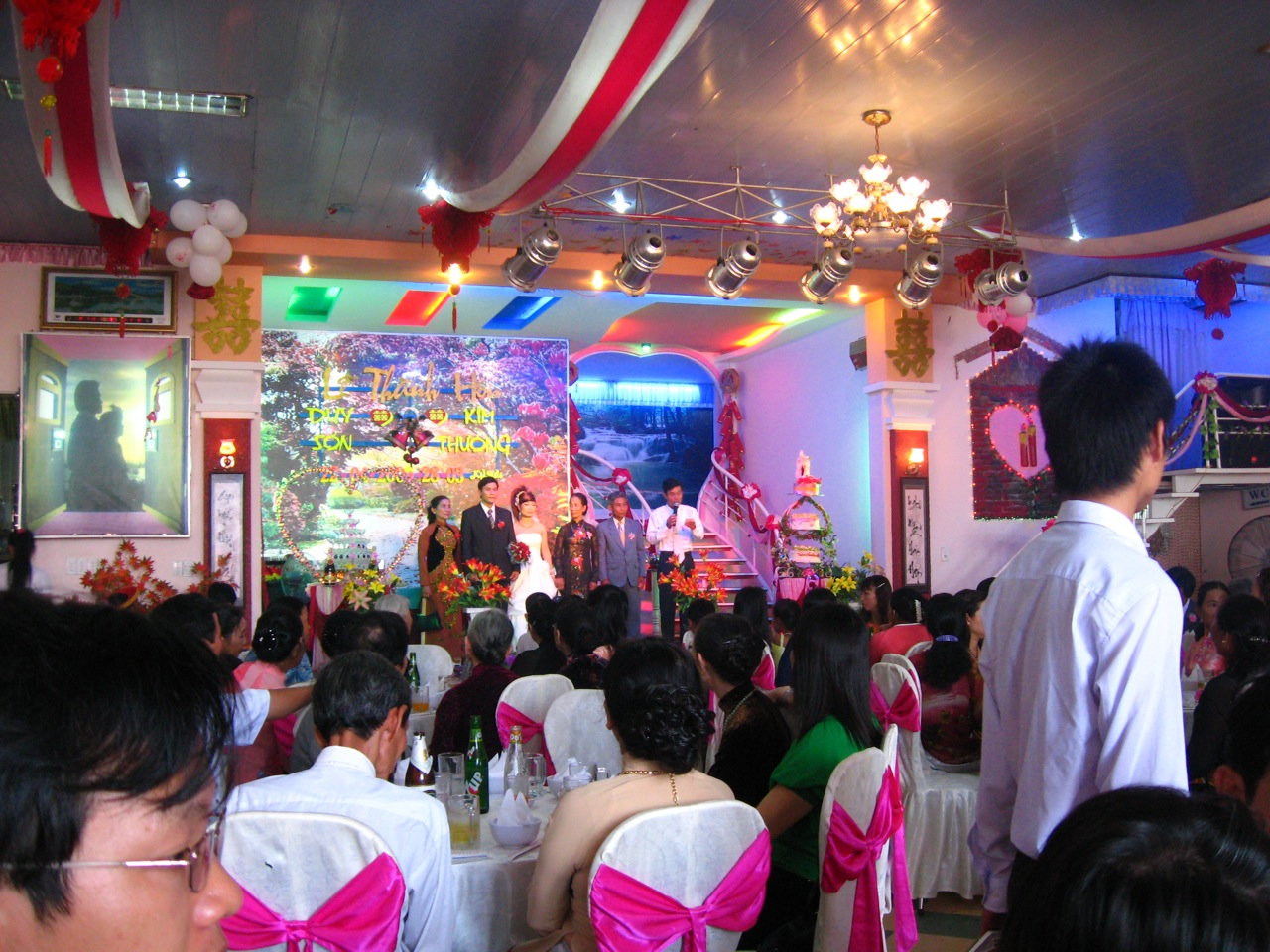
Modern reception in Vietnam

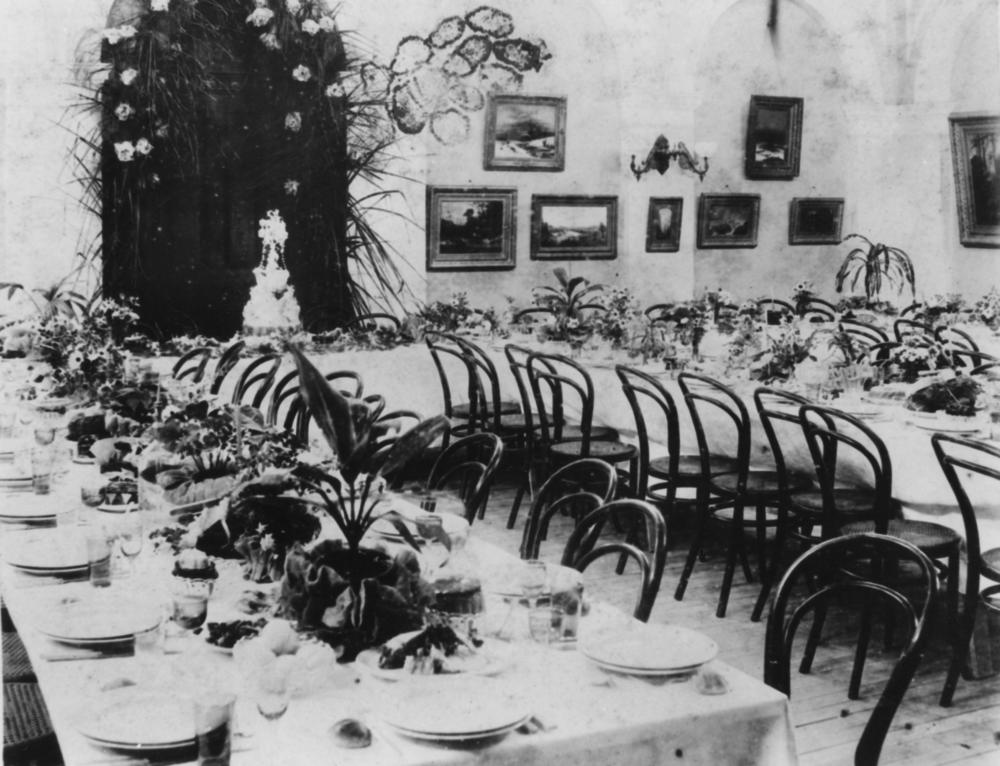
An elaborate wedding reception in 1894 in Australia

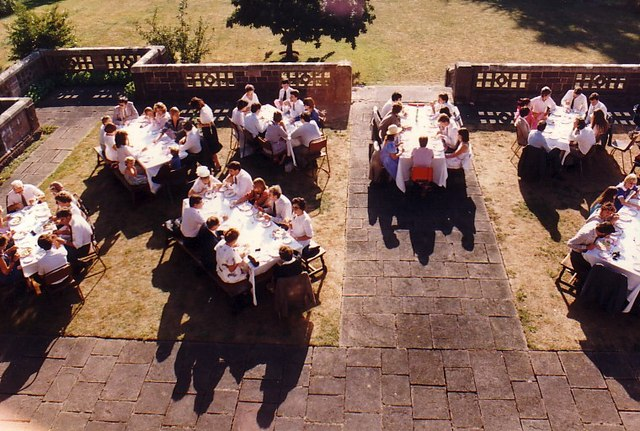
This wedding reception was held outdoors.

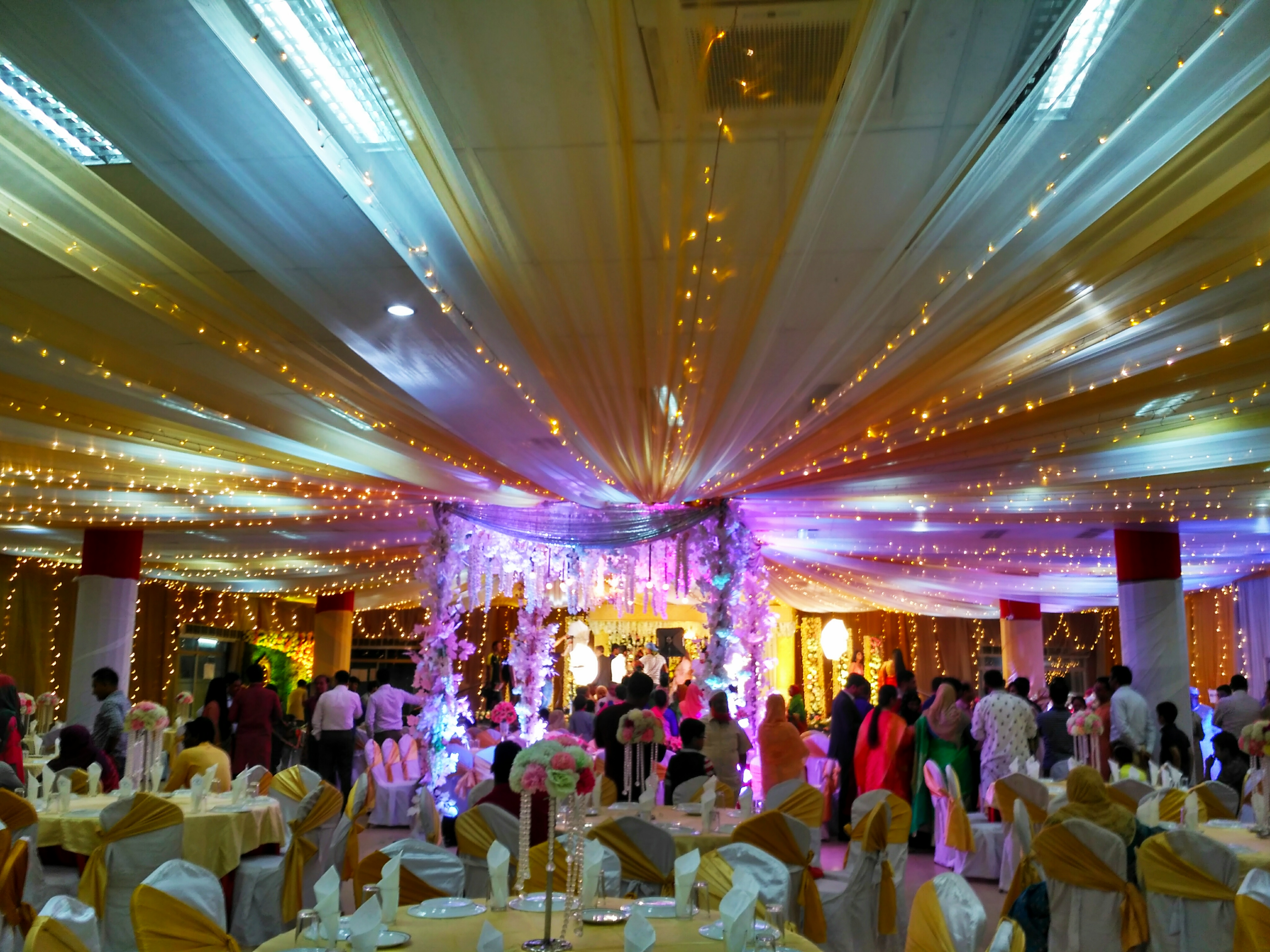
Wedding reception in 2019 in Bangladesh

Bouquet toss at a western-style wedding in Japan

== See also ==
- White wedding
