= Lambeth (disambiguation) =

Lambeth is a place in the London Borough of Lambeth.

Lambeth may also refer to:

- Lambeth, Middlesex County, Ontario, Canada
- Lambeth, Oxford County, Ontario, Canada
- Lambeth (UK Parliament constituency), a parliamentary constituency centred on the Lambeth district of South London
- London Borough of Lambeth, a London borough in South London, England
- Lambeth (electoral division), Greater London Council
- Metropolitan Borough of Lambeth, a metropolitan borough under London County Council from 1900 to 1965
- Lambeth Bridge, across the River Thames in London
- Lambeth Conference, decennial assemblies of bishops of the Anglican Communion
- Lambeth Palace, the official London residence of the Archbishop of Canterbury

== People with the surname ==
- J. Walter Lambeth (1896-1961), American politician
- Jonathan Lambeth (born 20th century), former British actor
- W. A. Lambeth (1867–1944), American professor
- Joseph Lambeth, British-American cake decorator
