= Cookie table =

Wedding tradition

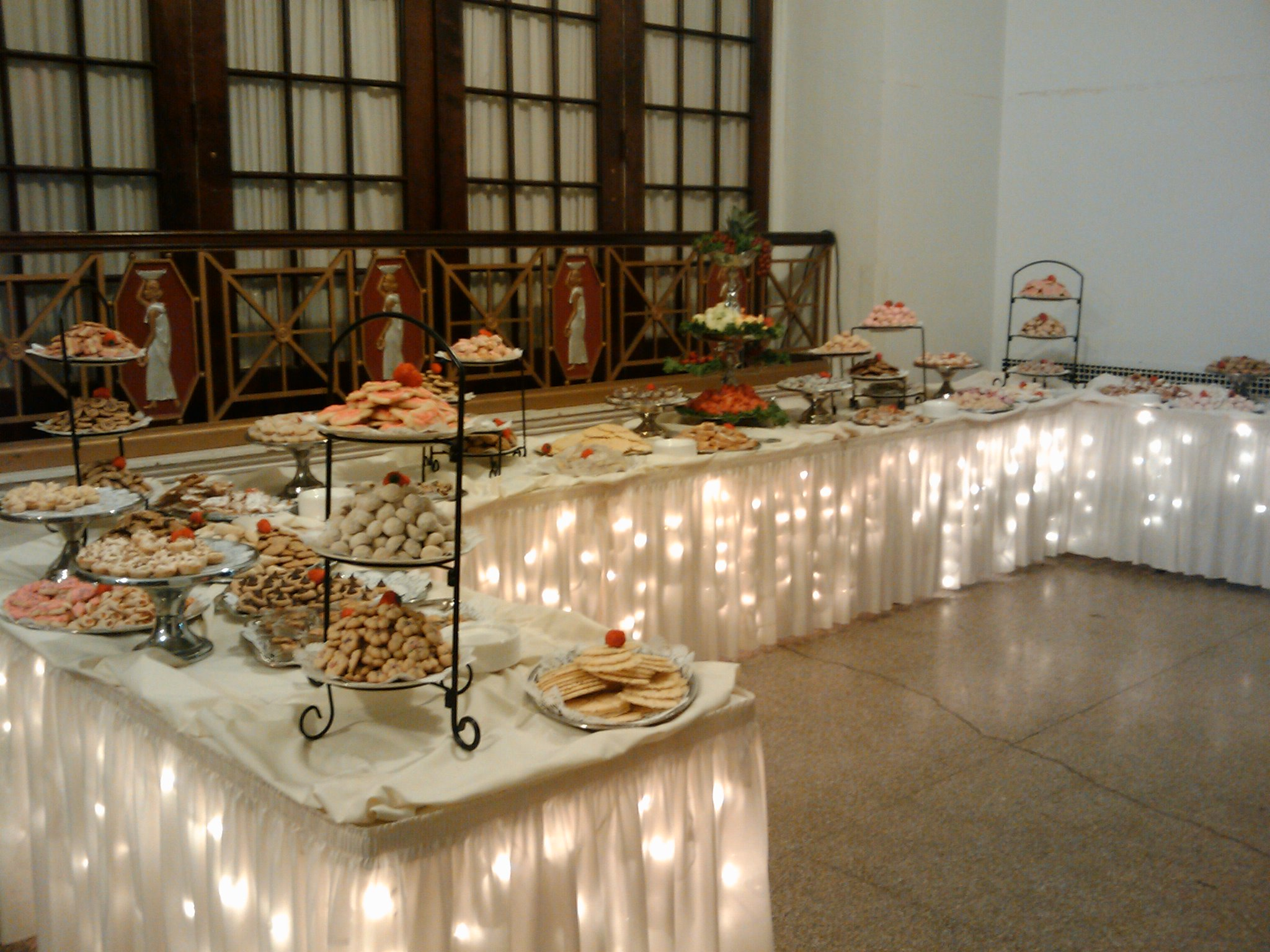
A cookie table at a Pittsburgh wedding

A cookie table is a wedding tradition where, in addition to a wedding cake, a large table with various kinds of cookies is presented to guests at the wedding reception. Cookies are generally prepared by family members in advance of the reception. It is typically a tradition in Pittsburgh, Pennsylvania, Youngstown, Ohio and Port Stanley, Ontario.

Cookie tables are included in primarily Italian, Polish, and Catholic wedding receptions. Other cultural groups that also have cookie tables or cookie platters include: British, French, Greeks, Pennsylvania Dutch, Slovaks, Serbian Orthodox, Austrian/Hungarian, and Scandinavians. The inclusion of a cookie table is more widely utilized where those of Italian ancestry settled. Where a settlement did not consist of sizable numbers of Italian or Eastern European groups, the number of those who were familiar with cookie tables decreased. Cookie tables were better known in the East Coast of the United States and Eastern Canada than in the Midwestern, Southern, Southwestern or West Coast regions of the United States and Western Canada.

Research by the Arms Family Museum of Local History in Youngstown indicates that the dominant areas for cookie tables are northeastern Ohio and western Pennsylvania, including New Castle, Pennsylvania. Cookie tables were also well known in West Virginia, Virginia, New York, New Jersey and Delaware.

The world record for the largest cookie table was set on August 11, 2019, in Monongahela, Pennsylvania, with 88,425 cookies.
