= Party favor =

Small gift given to the guests at a party or wedding reception

A party favor is a small gift given to the guests at a party as a gesture of thanks for their attendance, a memento of the occasion, or simply for fun.

== History ==
While the term "party favor" is modern, the practice dates back to the classical Graeco-Roman tradition, where food or flowers were gifted to the attendees of an event. In the Middle Ages entertainers were throwing small objects at the spectators, and the elaborate table decorations were sometimes gifted to important guests after the party.

The origins of elaborate party favors at the weddings can probably be traced to the 20th-century marriage of Victor Emmanuel of Savoy to Elena of Montenegro, where the guests received silver items of significant value. The tradition of sharing a wedding cake also represents gifting food to ensure good life and prosperity. The almost extinct in Britain, but revived in the US, tradition of the groom's cake involved boxing its pieces to be given away to the guests.

== Wedding traditions ==
The bittersweet taste of sugarcoated almonds was thought to represent life since the times of Ancient Rome, so these are given away to wedding guests in Italy and Greece to represent indivisibility of marriage (thus usually in odd numbers) or, alternatively, in sets of five, health, wealth, happiness, fertility, and longevity. Dutch people distribute five pieces of "bridal sweets" (Dutch: bruidssuikers) in tulle bags at their weddings.

At the Malaysian weddings, gifts of hand-painted eggs represent fertility. Japanese distribute flowers, small bottles of sake, and sweets. Puerto Rican guests get the ornamented cards (Spanish: copia) listing the wedding date and the couple's names. Moslem celebrations might involve gifts of candy or eggs.

Scottish weddings might have inedible favours attached to the cake and distributed to the guests by the bride.

== Distribution ==
The party favors can be either directly given to each guest, placed at the table setting, or used as prizes to be won as part of the entertainment.

A popular way of distributing the favors is a piñata, a vessel filled with candies and broken by the guests who take turns swinging a stick at it while blindfolded. The game might also involve searching for the favor, like in Easter egg hunt.

== Occasions ==
Guests at the celebratory events (for example, weddings or birthdays) and gatherings for major holidays (like Christmas) might receive party favors; these vary in price and durability (but frequently are trinkets of small nominal value) in accordance with the desires and budget of the host or hostess. This practice has spread to many other formal occasions such as baby showers, engagement parties, retirement parties, seasonal parties, once-in-a-lifetime events such as a Bar/Bat Mitzvah or Christening, and anniversaries.

For small social gatherings such as birthday parties, guests may receive a simple and inexpensive favor such as a small toy. In some cases guests might receive a small "gift bag", or "party bag" with a handful of favors, toys or trinkets, candy, pencils or other small gifts.

=== At weddings ===
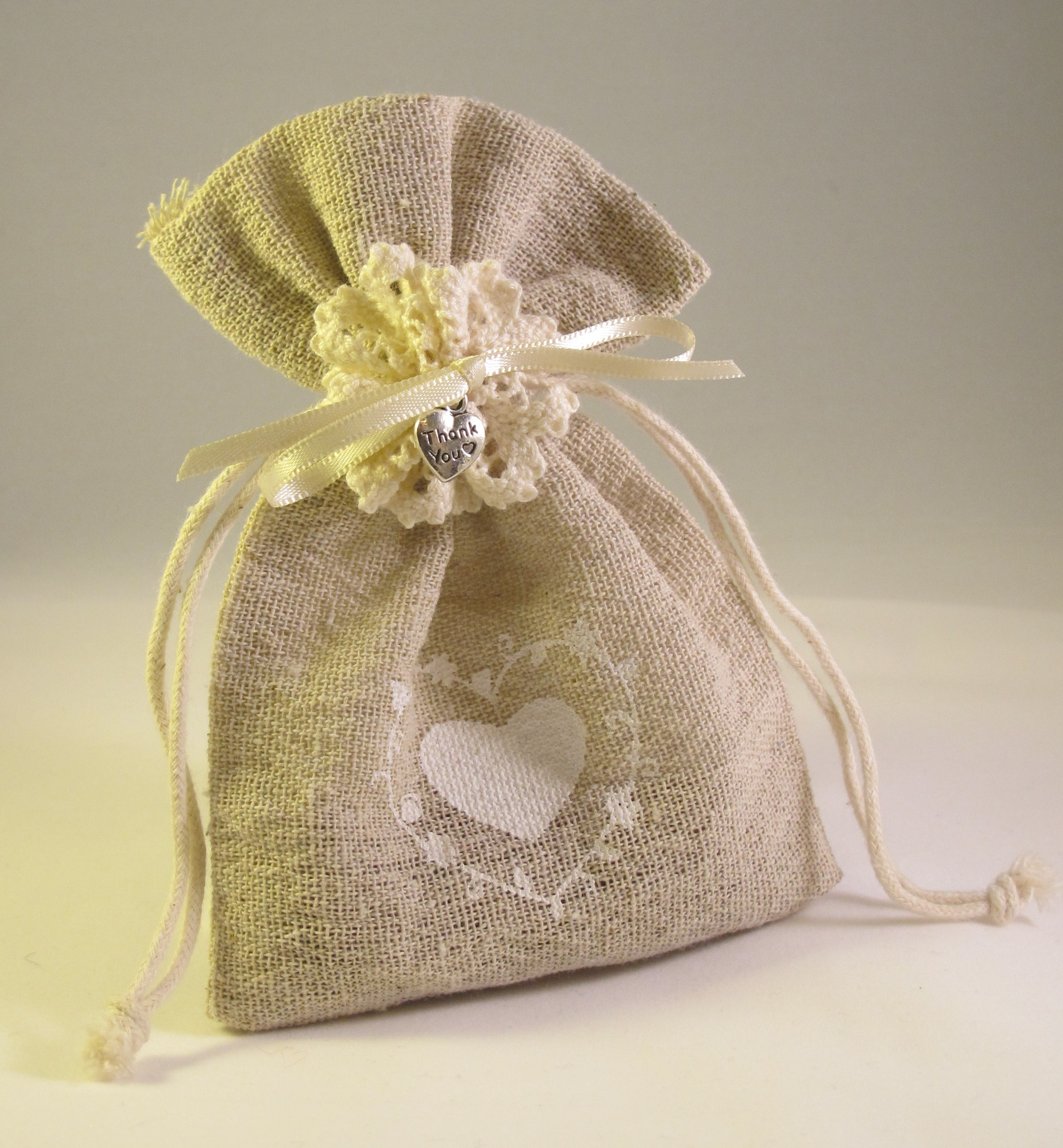
A traditional wedding and party favor

Wedding favors are small gifts given as a gesture of appreciation or gratitude to guests from the spouses during a wedding ceremony or a wedding reception.

The tradition of distributing wedding favors is hundreds of years old. It is believed that the first wedding favor, common amongst European aristocrats, was known as a bonbonniere. A bonbonniere is a small trinket box that was made of crystal, porcelain, and/or precious stones. The contents of these precious boxes were generally sugar cubes or delicate confections, which symbolize wealth and royalty.

As sugar became more affordable, bonbonnieres were replaced with almonds. For centuries, almonds were commonly distributed to wedding guests to signify well wishes on the bridegroom’s new life. In the thirteenth century, almonds coated with sugar, known as confetti, were introduced. Confetti soon transformed to sugared almonds, which started in ancient Greece and was inspired by the tale of Demophon, the king of Athens whose wife died and reincarnated as an almond tree. This later evolved into a wedding favor for modern day weddings. Traditionally, five Jordan almonds are presented in a confection box or wrapped in elegant fabric to represent fertility, longevity, wealth, health and happiness. The bitterness of the almond and the sweetness of the coated candy are a metaphor for the bitter sweetness of a marriage.

Today, gifts to guests are commonly known as wedding favors and are shared in cultures worldwide. Wedding favors have become a part of wedding reception planning, especially in the United States and Canada. Wedding favors are diverse and usually complement the theme or season of the event. Classic favors can range from the classic sugared almonds or individual chocolates to candles and scented soaps. Modern gift trends include: CDs with the favorite music of the bride and groom, shot glasses filled with colored candy or a charitable donation in the name of their guests. Gifts may also be personalized with the couple's or guest's names, initials or the wedding date.

=== Christmas ===
At the Christmas and holiday season, a popular favor is a Christmas cracker that combines a saltpeter charge and a prize inside a cardboard tube. Tom Smith, traditionally considered to be an inventor of the crackers, also made them for other occasions like world fairs and overseas trips by British monarchs.

A king cake is a popular way of distributing the favors through game of chance. It is typically served for the Feast of Epiphany and contains a figurine of a Christ child, its finder becomes the provider of the cake for the next year. The king cake might also contain a coin that obligates the finder to donate to a charity, and bean or pea crowning the finder as a king or queen of the day. In New Orleans, the cake is associated with Mardi Gras.

== Making or buying ==
The choice of favors is personal to the hosts, who might make or buy party favors for their event. The main factors in this decision are budget, the number of guests, the longevity or shelf life of the chosen favor, and the time available for making or shopping for favors. The longevity of the favor depends on whether or not it is edible or would otherwise spoil, such as fresh flowers.

== Other items considered party favors ==
Party favors may also refer to ephemeral items which help partygoers celebrate, but which are not meant to be lasting souvenirs. Examples include but are not limited to party hats, balloons, noisemakers, party horns (paper tubes that unroll when blown into), Christmas crackers, plastic leis, glow sticks, deely bobbers, and streamers and other kinds of confetti.

== Sources ==
- Adamson, M.W.; Segan, F., eds. (2008). "Party Favors". Entertaining from Ancient Rome to the Super Bowl: An Encyclopedia [2 volumes]. Bloomsbury Publishing. pp. 393–399. ISBN 978-0-313-08689-2.
