= Wedding cake topper =

Figurine placed on top of a wedding cake

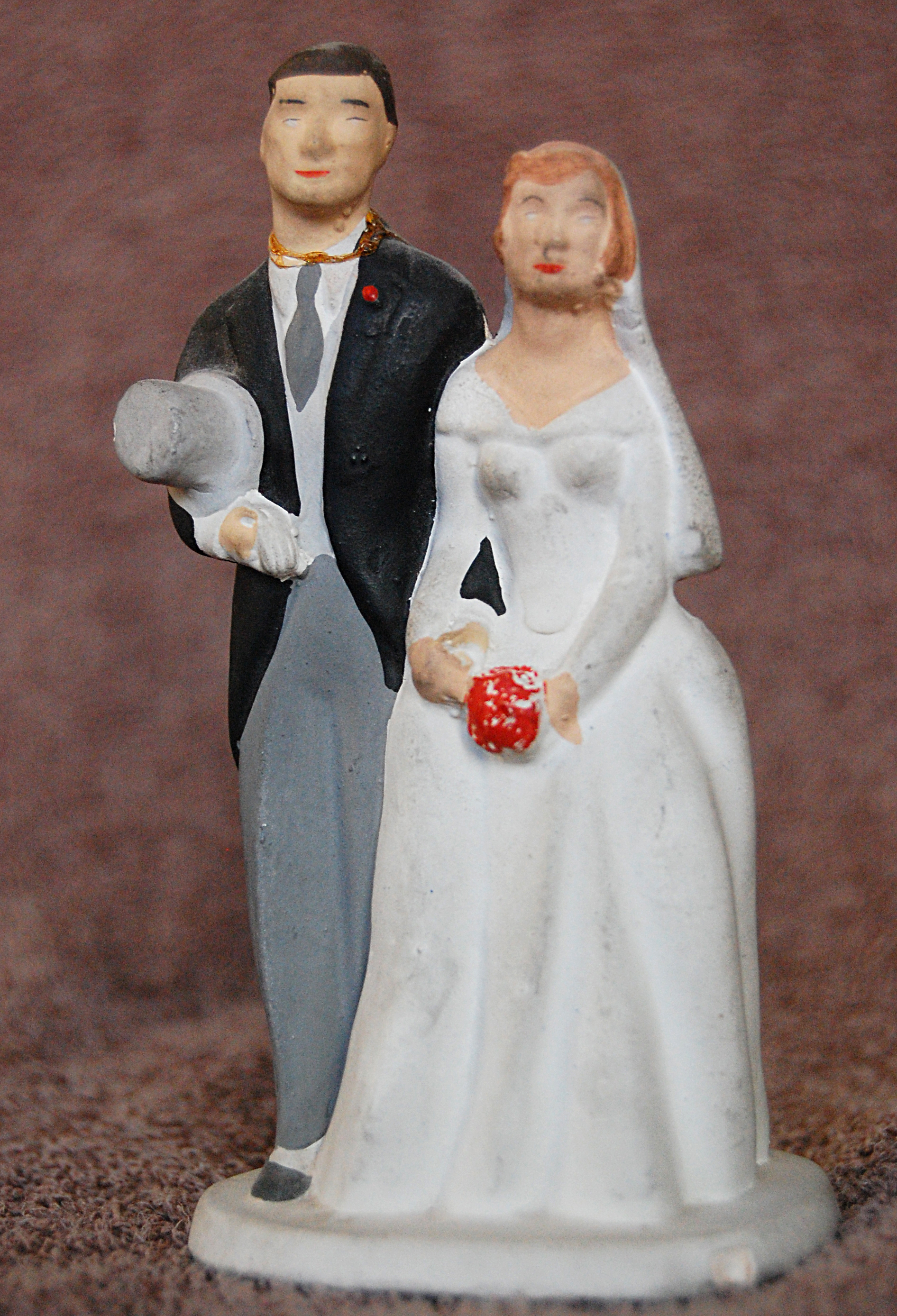
A traditional English topper in ceramic, from 1959

A wedding cake topper is a small model that sits on top of a wedding cake, normally a representation of the couple in formal wedding attire.

== History ==
The wedding cake topper was dominant in United States weddings in the 1950s where it represented togetherness. Today, these decorative figurines are often part of the couple's decorative theme or wedding reception style.

While traditionally the bride and groom were in formal attire, with the bride in a white wedding dress, complete with veil, and the groom in black morning dress, today there are many more designs available. There are specific ones for the style and theme of the wedding, for instance, traditional toppers for a formal wedding, and for less formal ones, there are comical wedding cake toppers or ones depending on the couple's hobbies.

== Diversity ==
In recent times, wedding cake toppers have reflected the growing diversity in marriages. Multi-ethnic wedding toppers are now available, as are same-sex wedding toppers.

== See also ==
- Figurine
- Loving cup
