= Joseph Lambeth =

British-American cake decorator

Joseph Lambeth was a British-American cake decorator.

Lambeth is known for having popularized a piping technique for the decoration of elaborate cakes, particularly wedding cakes. This method was described in his 1934 book The Lambeth Method of Cake Decoration & Practical Pastries. It peaked in popularity in the 1950s before being replaced by fondant decoration, but has experienced a resurgence in popularity in the 2020s, being described as both a "Lambeth cake" or "vintage style" cake. Kate Middleton requested the technique be used in the creation of the cake for her wedding to Prince William in 2011. Lambeth regularly competed in and won awards at the International Food and Confectionery Exposition in London, and also opened a cake decorating school in England.
