= Groom's cake =

Type of wedding cake

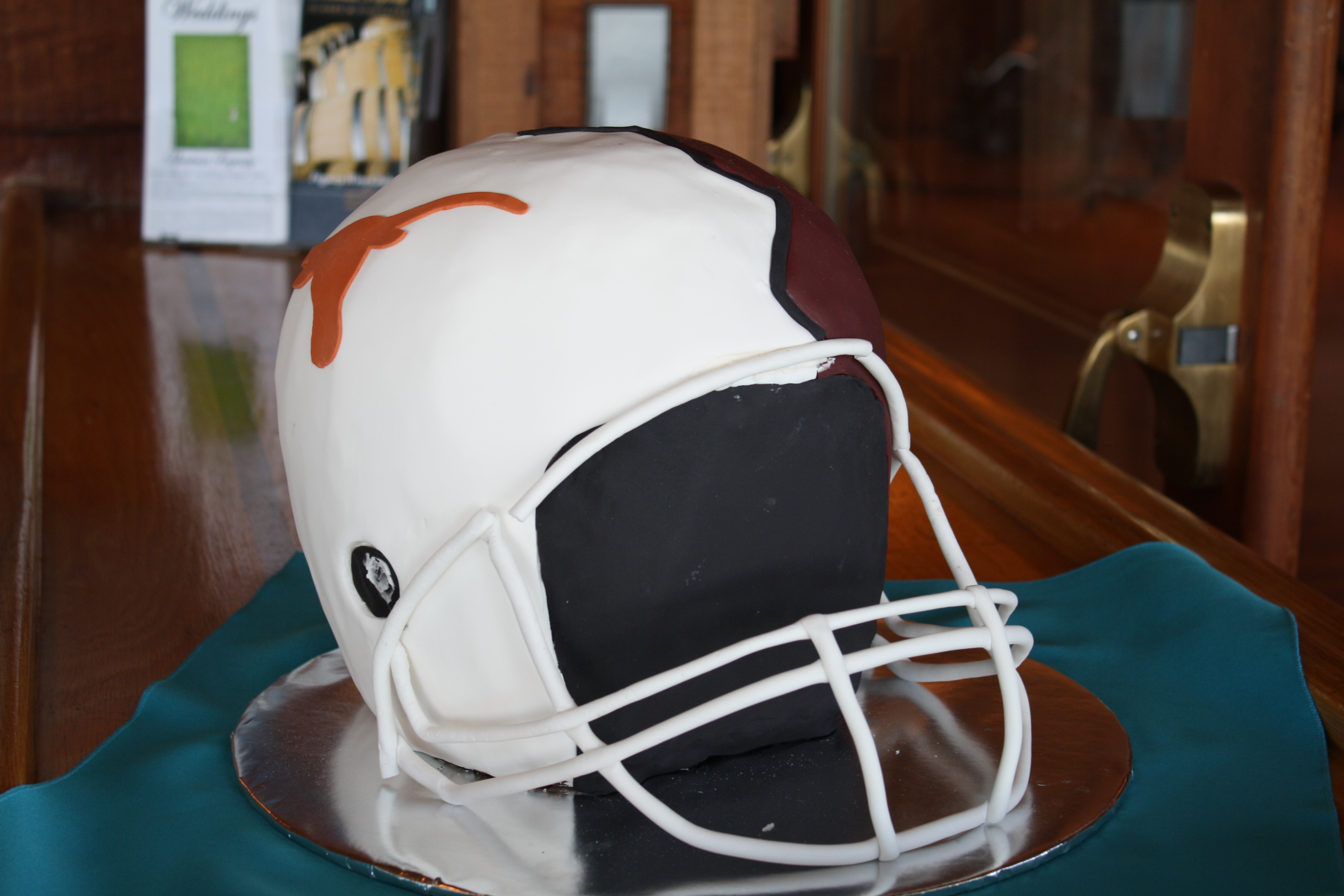
- Groom's cake in the shape of a Texas Longhorns and Texas A&M Aggies football helmet
- Type: Cake
- Course: Dessert
- Place of origin: England, United States
- Region or state: Southern states
- Main ingredients: Chocolate, fruit

A groom's cake is a wedding tradition that originated in Victorian England, but is more frequently observed in the American South. While a wedding cake may often be light in texture or color and decorated in white, the groom‘s cake can take a variety of forms. Many incorporate chocolate or fruit. Cheesecake sometimes serves as a groom's cake. The groom's cake is often served at a separate table from the wedding cake at a wedding reception or wedding breakfast, and may also be served as a dessert at the rehearsal dinner.

== History ==
The tradition of the groom's cake began in Britain. The groom's cake was often richer than the bride's, since stronger flavors such as chocolate, fruitcake, and alcohol were considered more masculine. Groom's cakes during the Victorian era were heavy, dense fruitcakes. A characteristic recipe for the groom's fruit cake was published in The British Baker in 1897. Eventually, flour cakes, either white or chocolate, supplanted fruit cakes as the most popular choice.

Groom’s cake is a tradition most popular in the Southeastern United States. It was brought over from Britain by colonists. The Southern groom's cake was traditionally a dark-liquor soaked fruitcake, especially in Virginia. The white-iced bride's cake was considered too light for masculinity. Chocolate groom's cakes became popular in the late 19th century, but they can be any flavor, such as carrot cake, red velvet cake, etc.

Groom's cakes are usually served at the wedding reception as a second flavor choice to the guests, but are often served at the rehearsal dinner in some regions. Groom's cakes are often decorated to reflect the groom's hobbies or interests, such as golfing, fishing, hunting, and other sports. The 1989 movie Steel Magnolias features a famous scene with a red velvet groom's cake shaped as a giant armadillo.

Another tradition was to cut a piece of the cake and put it in a small box, then present the box to an unmarried woman attending the wedding. The woman was not expected to eat the cake, but rather to put it under her pillow. Superstition held that this tradition would help an unmarried woman find a husband.
