= Wedding cake =

Cake for a wedding

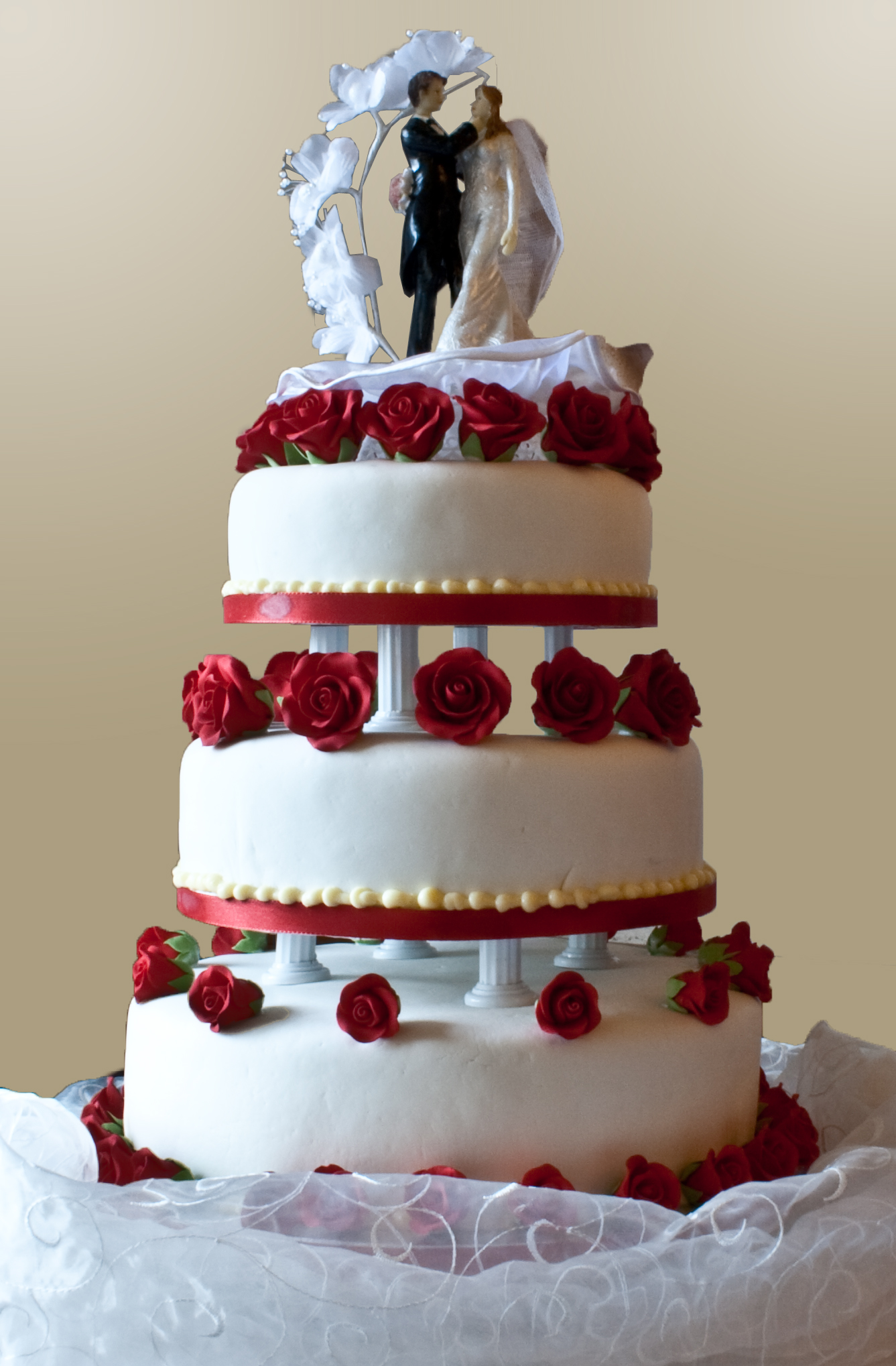
- A three-layer wedding cake with pillar supports and "topper" figures
- Type: Cake

A wedding cake is the traditional cake served at wedding receptions following dinner. In some parts of England, the wedding cake is served at a wedding breakfast; the 'wedding breakfast' does not mean the meal will be held in the morning, but at a time following the ceremony on the same day. In modern Western culture, the cake is usually on display and served to guests at the reception. Traditionally, wedding cakes were made to bring good luck to all guests and the couple. Nowadays, however, they are more of a centerpiece to the wedding and are not always even served to the guests. Some cakes are built with only a single edible tier for the bride and groom to share, but this is rare since the cost difference between fake and real tiers is minimal.

== Basic information ==
Wedding cakes come in a variety of sizes, depending on the number of guests the cake will serve. Modern pastry chefs and cake designers use various ingredients and tools to create a cake that usually reflects the personalities of the couple. Marzipan, fondant, gum paste, buttercream, and chocolate are among the popular ingredients used. Cakes range in price along with size and components. Cakes are usually priced on a per-person, or per-slice, basis. Prices can range from a few dollars to a few hundred dollars per-person or slice, depending on the pastry chef who is hired to make the cake. Wedding cakes and cake decorating in general have become a certain pop culture symbol in western society. In the United States, reality television shows such as Cake Boss and Amazing Wedding Cakes have become popular and are trending in today's popular culture.

== History ==
The first wedding cakes were probably made in ancient Greece. Roman weddings, too, appear to have involved the eating of a wedding cake by the bride and bridegroom.

Ronald Reagan and Nancy Reagan cutting their wedding cake, 1952

=== Early modern European wedding cakes ===
During the 16th century to the 17th century, the "bride's pie" was served at most weddings. Different from the modern sweet wedding cake, bride pie is savoury. Bride pie is a pie with pastry crust and filled an assortment of oysters, lamb testicles, pine kernels, and cocks' combs (from Robert May's 1685 recipe). For May's recipe, there is a compartment of bride pie which is filled with live birds or a snake for the guests to pass the time in a wedding when they cut up the pie at the table. Guests were expected to have a piece out of politeness. It was considered very rude and bad luck not to eat the bride's pie. One tradition of bride's pie was to place a glass ring in the middle of the dessert and the maiden who found it would be the next to marry, similar to the modern tradition of catching the flower bouquet.

In the 17th century, two cakes were made: one for the bride and one for the groom. The groom's cake would fall out of favour as the bride's cake became the main cake for the event. When the two cakes were served together, the groom's cake was typically the darker colored, rich fruit cake and generally much smaller than the bride's cake. The bride's cake was usually a simple pound cake with white icing because white was a sign of virginity and purity.

Wedding cake was originally a luxury item, and a sign of celebration and social status (the bigger the cake, the higher the social standing). Wedding cakes in England and early America were traditionally fruit cakes, often tiered and topped with marzipan and icing. Cutting the cake was an important part of the reception.

In medieval England cakes were stacked as high as possible for the bride and groom to kiss over. A successful kiss meant they were guaranteed a prosperous life together. From this the Croquembouche was created. The myth behind this cake tells of a pastry chef, visiting medieval England, who witnessed their tradition of piling sweet rolls between the bride and groom, which they attempted to kiss over without knocking them all down. The pastry chef then went back to France and piled sweet rolls up into a tower to make the first Croquembouche. The modern croquembouche is still very popular in France, where it is now common to place the croquembouche tower on a bed of cake and make it a top tier. This traditional French wedding cake is built from profiteroles and given a halo of spun sugar.

In 1703, Thomas Rich, a baker's apprentice from Ludgate Hill, fell in love with his employer's daughter and asked her to marry him. He wanted to make an extravagant cake, so he drew on St Bride's Church, on Fleet Street in London for inspiration.

Traditionally the bride would place a ring inside the couple's portion of the cake to symbolize acceptance of the proposal. Bride's pie would evolve into the bride's cake. At this point the dessert was no longer in the form of a pie and was sweeter than its predecessor. The bride cake was traditionally a plum or fruit cake. In the mid-18th century, double icing (covering the cake first with almond icing and then with white icing) was used on bride cake. The white-iced upper surface of the bride cake was used as a platform on which all sorts of scenes and emblems could be mounted. The decoration was often at least partially three-dimensional and colourful in appearance. However, since some decorations were made with a variety of substances, sometimes the decoration or even parts of wedding cake were inedible. The myth that eating the pie would bring good luck was still common, but the glass ring slowly fell out of favor as the flower bouquet toss replaced it.

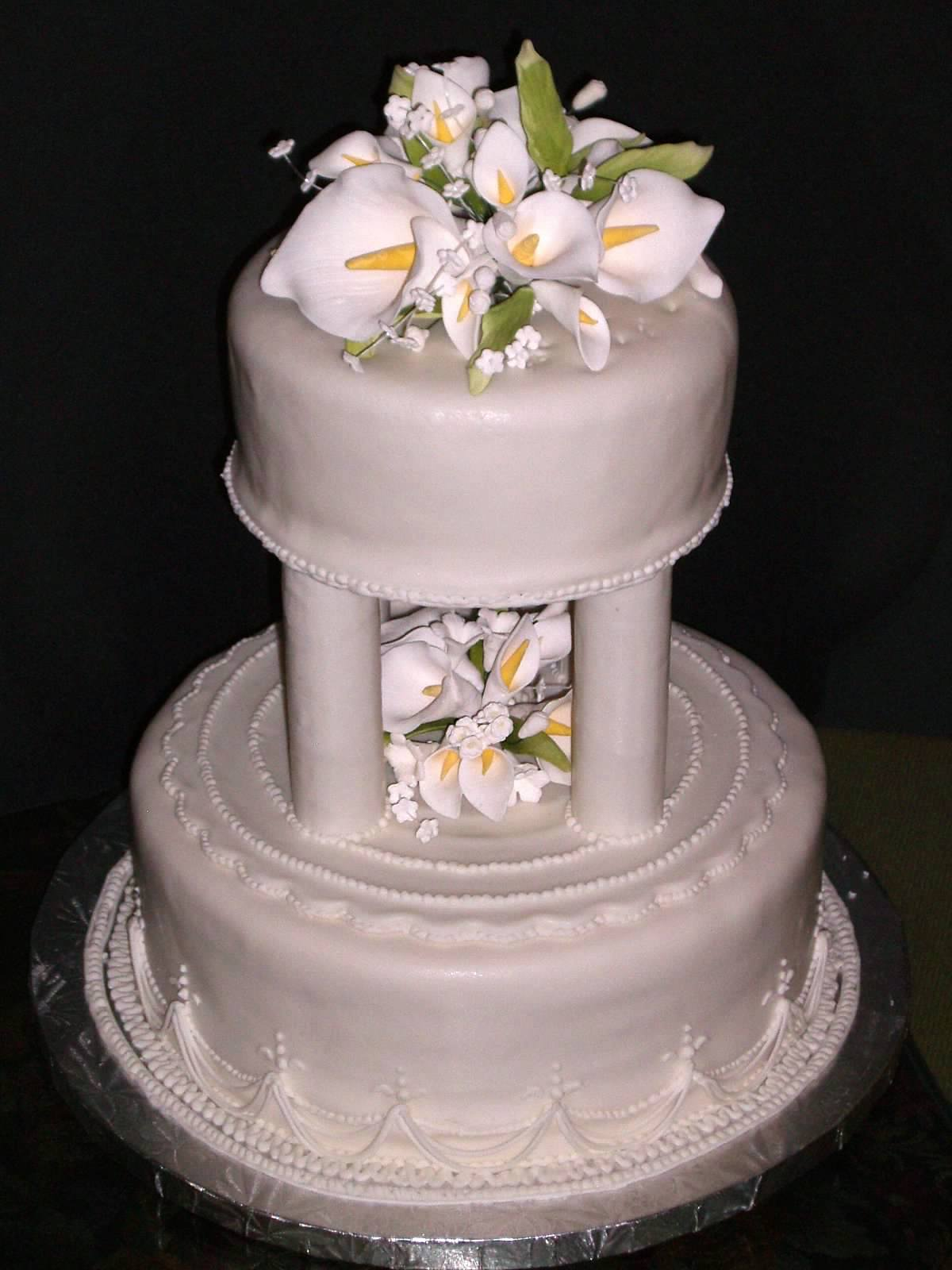
Tiered cake with calla lilies, a symbol of purity

=== Modern Western approach ===
The bride's cake would transform into the modern wedding cake we know today. In the early 19th century, sugar became easier to obtain during the time when the bride's cakes became popular. The more refined and whiter sugars were still very expensive, so only wealthy families could afford to have a very pure white frosting. This display would show the wealth and social status of the family. When Queen Victoria used white icing on her cake it gained a new title: royal icing.

The modern wedding cake as we know it now would originate at the 1882 wedding of Prince Leopold, Duke of Albany; his wedding cake was the first to actually be completely edible. Pillars between cake tiers did not begin to appear until about 20 years later. The pillars were very poorly made from broomsticks covered in icing. The tiers represented prosperity and were a status symbol because only wealthy families could afford to include them in the cake. Prince Leopold's wedding cake was created in separate layers with very dense icing. When the icing would harden the tiers could be stacked, a groundbreaking innovation for wedding cakes at the time. Modern wedding cakes still use this method, with an added form of support with dowels imbedded in the cake to help carry the load, especially of larger cakes.

== Symbolism ==
Royal Wedding Cake from 1858 (Note: Wedding of Princess Victoria 'Vicky' (Queen Victoria's oldest child) and Crown Prince Frederick William 'Fritz' of Prussia)

Wedding cakes have been present at wedding ceremonies for centuries. They were not always the focus of the event and often came in different forms, like pies or bread. There has always been a lot of symbolism associated with the wedding cake. The earliest known sweet wedding cake is known as a Banbury cake, which became popular in 1655.

The white color has been attached to wedding ceremonies since the Victorian era when Queen Victoria chose to wear a white lace wedding dress at her wedding to Prince Albert in 1840. Queen Victoria accentuated an existing symbol, the color white, being frequently associated with virginity and purity in Western culture. The wedding cake was originally known as the bride's cake; therefore, the color white became common because the cake needed to reflect the bride – and the expensive ingredients that the family was able to afford, such as refined white sugar.

The cutting of the cake is a task full of symbolism.

In China, the couple begins cutting a multi-tier cake from the lowest level and gives the first pieces to their parents and other ancestors as a symbolic way of honoring their place as the foundation of the family.

== Superstitions ==
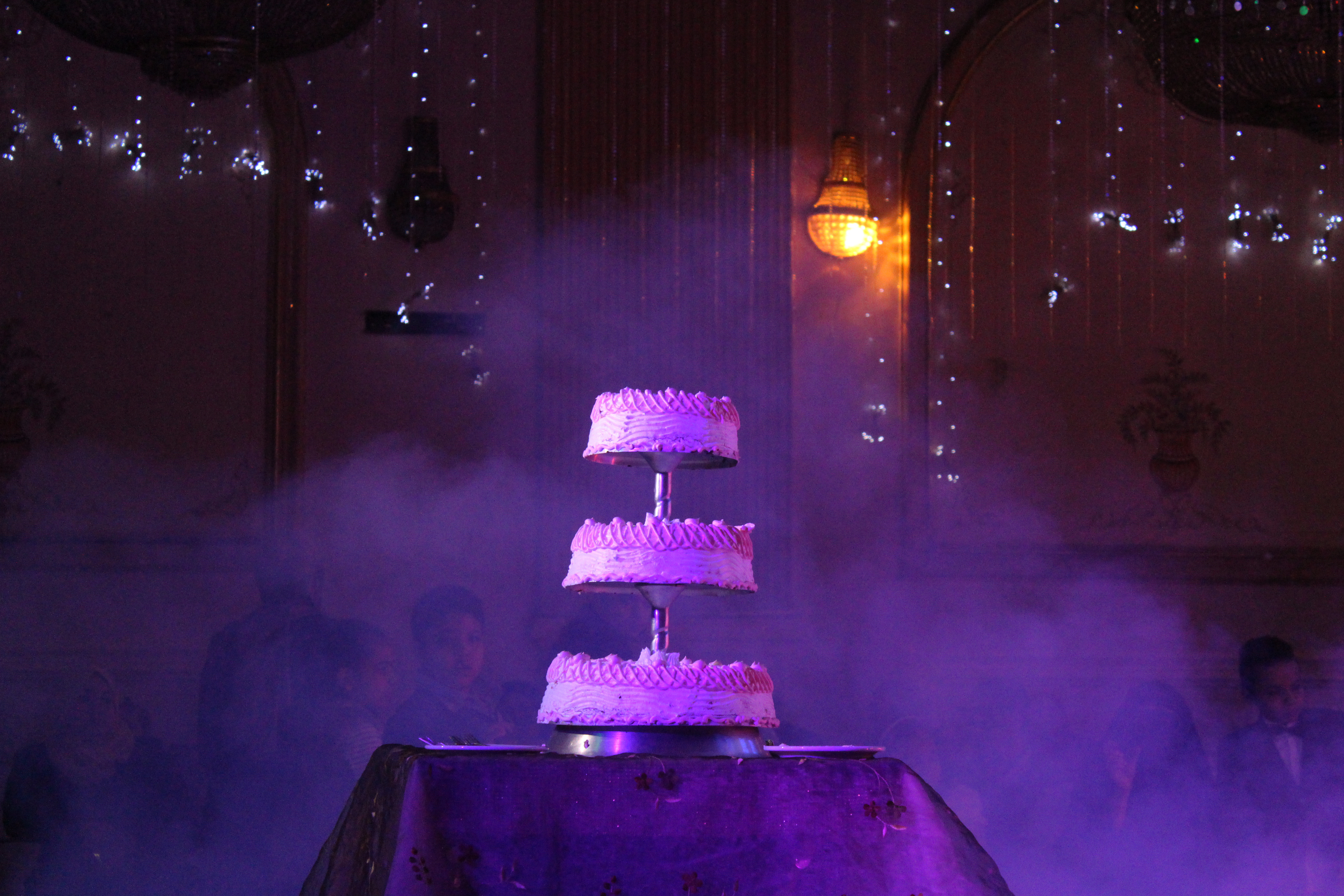
Wedding cake from Cairo

The wedding cake is surrounded by superstitions. In a traditional American wedding, maidens would be invited to pull ribbons that are attached to the bottom layer of the wedding cake. Out of all the ribbons, only one contains a charm or a ring, and whoever gets the charm will be the next person to marry. A similar tradition in the south of England, believed to have originated in Romany culture, involves baking a wooden clothes peg in the cake, symbolising the connection of the couple to each other. In other countries, the wedding cake is broken over the bride's head to ensure fertility and bring good fortune to the couple. Also, some people today think that eating the crumbs of the wedding cake would give them good luck because the wedding cake symbolizes happiness and good life to the newlywed couple.

There are also myths that bridesmaids have on dreaming of their future husbands. Hopeful bridesmaids would take a piece of cake home and place it under the pillow. Some bridesmaids would sleep with the pieces of cake in their left stocking and the rest under their pillows after passing the pieces of cake through the bride's wedding ring.

In the medieval era, wedding cakes were constructed in rolls and buns that were laid on top of each other. The groom and bride would attempt to share a kiss on top of the stack of rolls to ensure fertility and have good fortune.

In Britain, from at least the 18th to 20th centuries, wedding cakes were the subject of a form of oneiromancy, or dream divination, whereby young women would place a small piece of wedding cake under their pillow at night in the belief that this would allow them to dream of their future husband, thus identifying him. Often, it was thought that the bits of cake would not have this effect unless it were passed a certain number of times through a wedding ring. Hence, the 19th-century antiquarian John Brand wrote of the practice that:

In the North, slices of bridecake are put through the wedding ring: they are afterwards laid under pillows, at night, to cause young persons to dream of their lovers. [Francis] Douce says this custom is not peculiar to the north of England. It seems to prevail generally. The pieces of the cake must be drawn nine times through the wedding ring.

== Types of wedding cakes ==
Different types of cakes have been popular in different countries and at different times. In some countries, such as Italy, different couples choose different types of cake, according to their preferences. In others, a single type is chosen by most people. Even when a type is preferred within a culture, the preferred type may change significantly over time. For example, the traditional wedding cake in Korea was a rice cake topped with a powder made from red beans, but now guests are likely to see a sponge cake and fresh fruit.

=== Styles ===
The typical style for a modern white wedding is a decorated white layer cake. It is usually coated and decorated with frosting. The layers may be filled with frosting, pastry cream, lemon curd, or other cake fillings. It may be topped by decorations made from frosting, with edible flowers, or with other decorations. A layer cake can be a single cake, or it can be assembled to form a tiered cake.

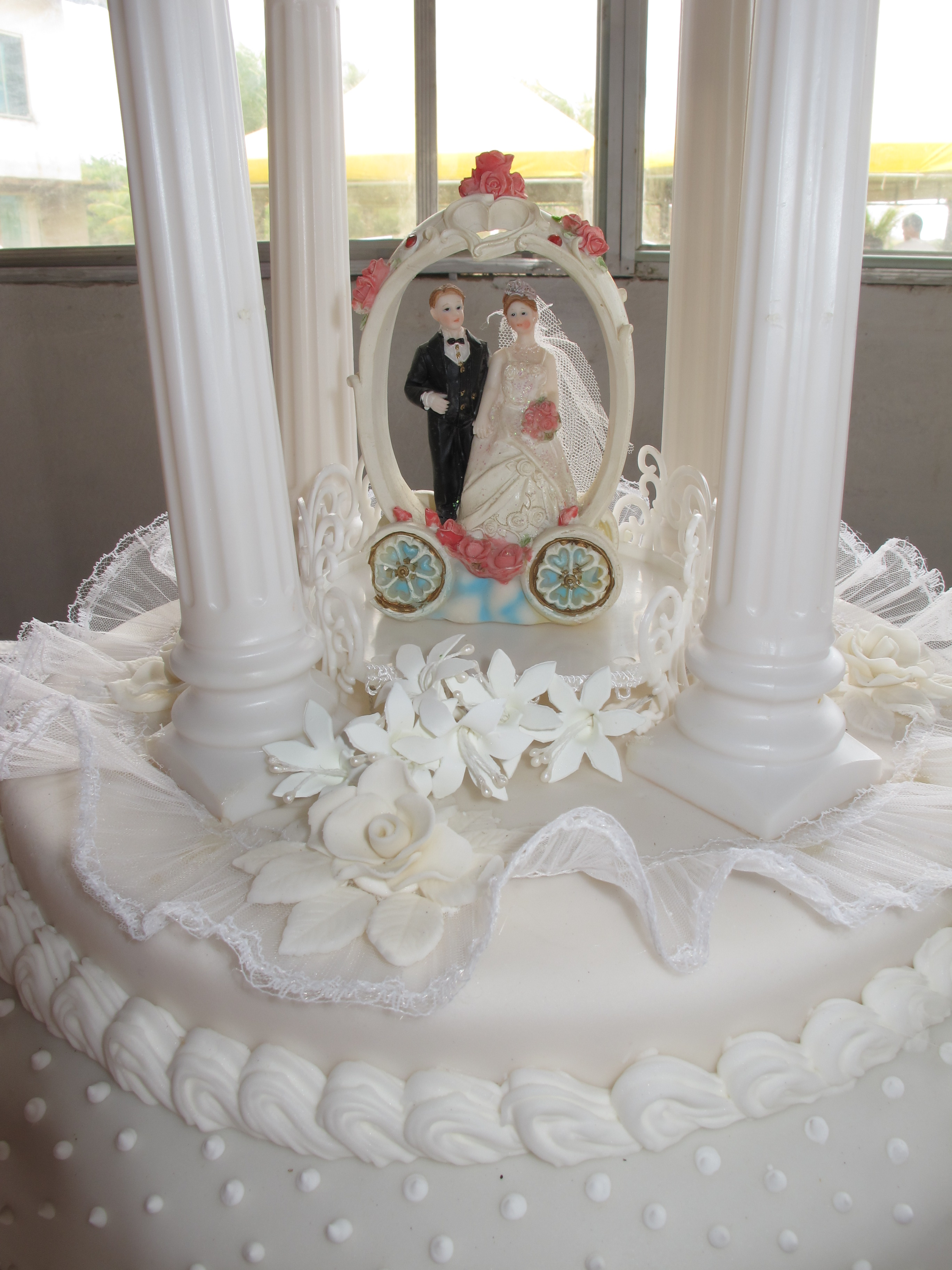
A plastic wedding topper used as decoration, set inside tall columns that separate the tiers of the cake

Very tall tiered cakes are important in Indonesia. The overall height of the cake is said to predict the couple's prosperity.

In the US, three tiers has been the most common choice since at least the 1960s.

In Appalachia, a stack cake was a way for poorer people to celebrate potluck-style by spreading the expense across the community. A stack cake is made of thin cakes baked by different guests for the wedding. These cakes are stacked on top of each other, with the layers usually being filled with apple butter or cooked apples.

Among the Cajuns in the US, multiple cakes are baked at home by the bride's family, rather than having one large cake.

=== Flavors ===
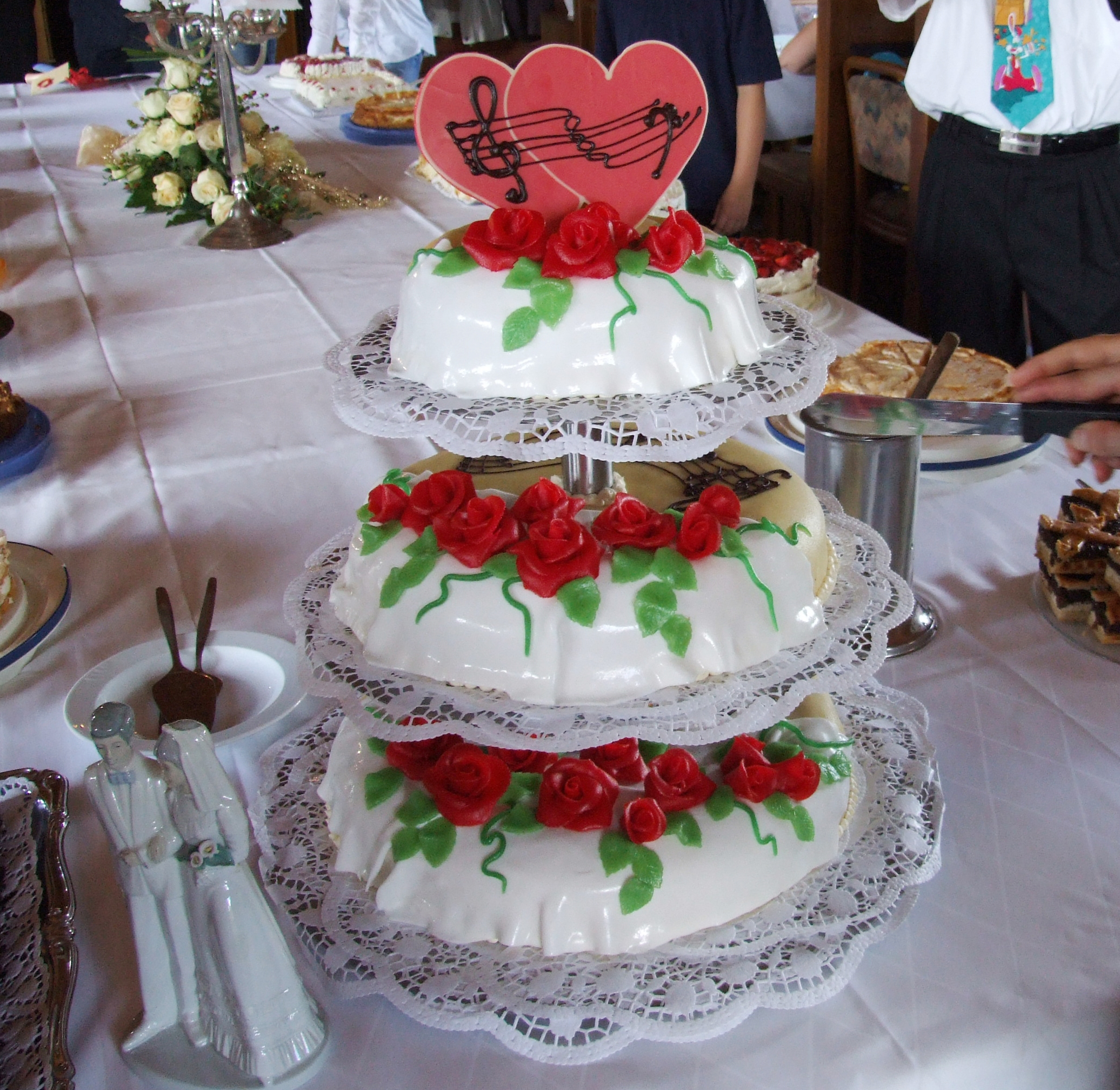
Three-tiered wedding cake in Germany. Chocolate sponge cake is popular in Germany and Austria.

In the United Kingdom and Australia, the traditional wedding cake is a rich fruitcake, which is elaborately decorated with icing and may be filled with almond paste. Fruitcake was also the traditional wedding cake in the US until the middle of the 20th century.

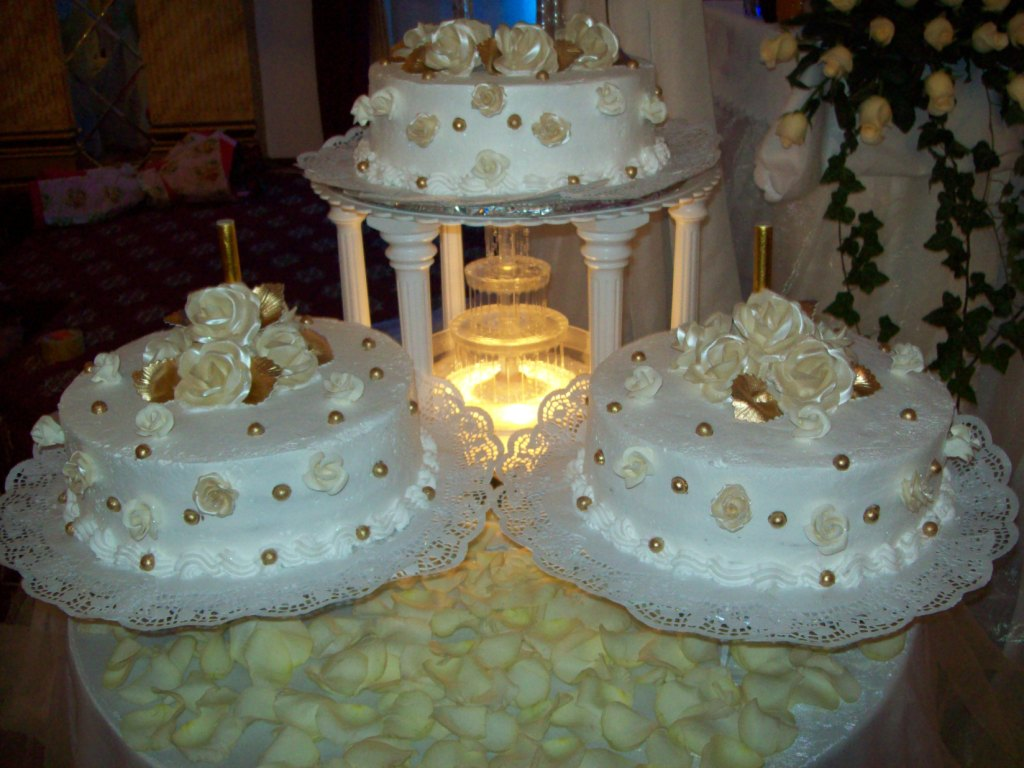
Wedding cake with "gold pearls"

According to the results of one survey, in the 1960s, 1970s, and 1980s, most wedding cakes in the US were either white or yellow cakes. In the 2000s and 2010s, there was more diversity in flavors, but most of them were white or chocolate cake.

In Greece, the traditional flavor combination was honey, sesame seed, and quince. In modern Greece, an almond torte is more common. Greek wedding cakes are elaborate and even architectural, with many tiers.

In the Philippines, the cake may be a vanilla sponge cake, but it might also be a purple ube cake.

White cake is currently the most popular wedding cake flavor in the US, but different flavors of filling can be added between layers. Chocolate, carrot, Italian Rum and Italian Cream are also popular choices.

=== Groom's cake ===
In some areas, particularly the American South, two cakes are presented at weddings. Usually, a large, white tiered cake, decorated mostly in white frosting, is called the bride's cake, and a second flavor choice is called the "groom's cake". This tradition was brought over from England by early American colonists, who considered the white-iced bride's cake too light for men's tastes. The groom's cake was usually a dark, liquor-soaked fruitcake. More recently, groom's cakes are usually chocolate or another of his favorite flavors. The groom's cake may be decorated or shaped as something significant to him, such as a hobby item, sports team or symbol of his occupation. The movie Steel Magnolias included a red velvet groom's cake in the shape of a giant armadillo.

Bermuda has a different tradition of two cakes. There, the bride's cake is a three-tiered fruitcake, and the groom's cake is a pound cake. The bride's cake is decorated with silver and represents prosperity, and the groom's cake is decorated with gold and represents his role as the head of the family. The groom's cake is topped with a live cedar tree, which represents the couple's growing love, and which the couple later plants and cares for.

When Prince William married Catherine Middleton in 2011, a groom's cake was served alongside the wedding cake at the reception. The groom's cake was a chocolate biscuit cake based on a family recipe and McVitie's were asked to create it.

=== Decorations ===
Tiered cakes are often separated by flowers or columns to add visual impact and height. Separators can include jewels, shells, flowers and the like or can be completely separated by using traditional chrome stands.

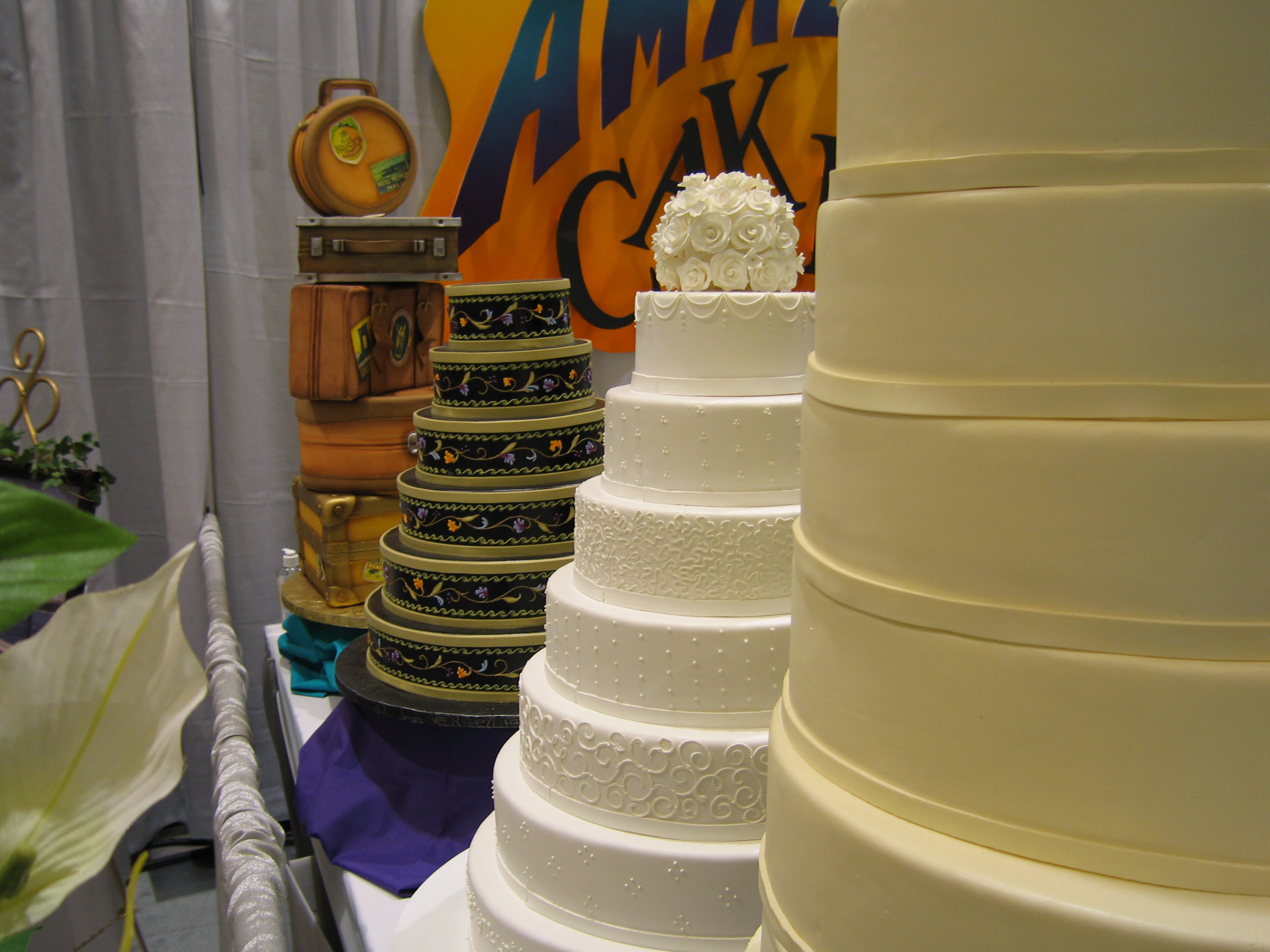
Wedding cakes covered with fondant, on display at a sales event. Because the layers are stacked one atop the next, with no columns or separation between them, this style is sometimes called a stacked cake.

Fondant is a form of frosting style that is rolled out and draped over tiers. Its smooth, firm sugar icing is often embellished with appliqués, Fondant can be cut into designs, formed into shapes, flavored or tinted. Poured fondant is used to glaze petits fours and other detailed confections.

Flowerpaste or gumpaste is a pliable dough usually made from egg whites, unflavored gelatine, and powdered sugar. There are an array of methods and ingredients around the world on how to make flowerpaste and gumpaste. The purpose of this dough is typically to create flowers and other decorations for a cake. Due to the use of gum as one of the ingredients, it can be rolled very thin.

Royal icing is made with water, sugar and egg white or meringue powder. It hardens to a firm finish that can be piped or thinned for "flood work", when larger sections need to be iced. It hardens fast and is ideal for making detailed shapes ahead of time. It can also be piped directly onto cake tiers and works beautifully for delicate detail work. There are a few things to consider when working with royal icing: You must use grease free utensils. Humidity also affects the consistency of royal icing. Joseph Lambeth, a well known British cake decorator, developed a technique where he creates layered scrolls using royal icing as a medium.

A wedding cake may be topped with fresh flowers. This is typical in the Philippines.

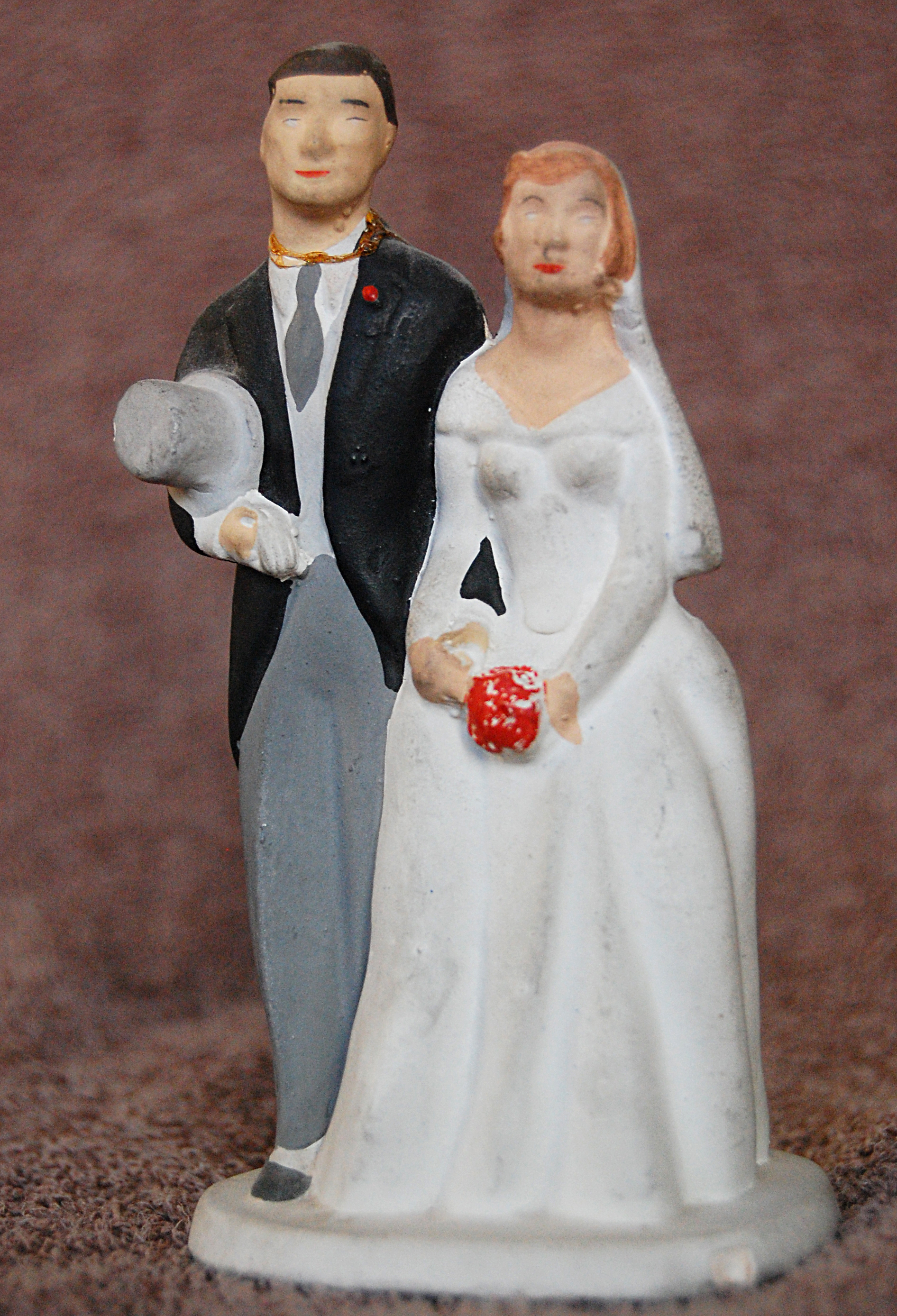
A traditional English topper in ceramic, from 1959

Wedding cake toppers are models or art pieces that sit atop the cake. In the US, the most common type of cake topper features a representation of a bride and groom in wedding attire. This custom was dominant in US weddings in the 1950s, where it represented togetherness. Wedding toppers may also be figures that indicate shared hobbies or other passions, if they are used at all. Some are humorous, or may represent the couple's hobby or occupation. In Mexico, the wedding topper and other decorations tell a story about the couple's history.

=== North Africa ===
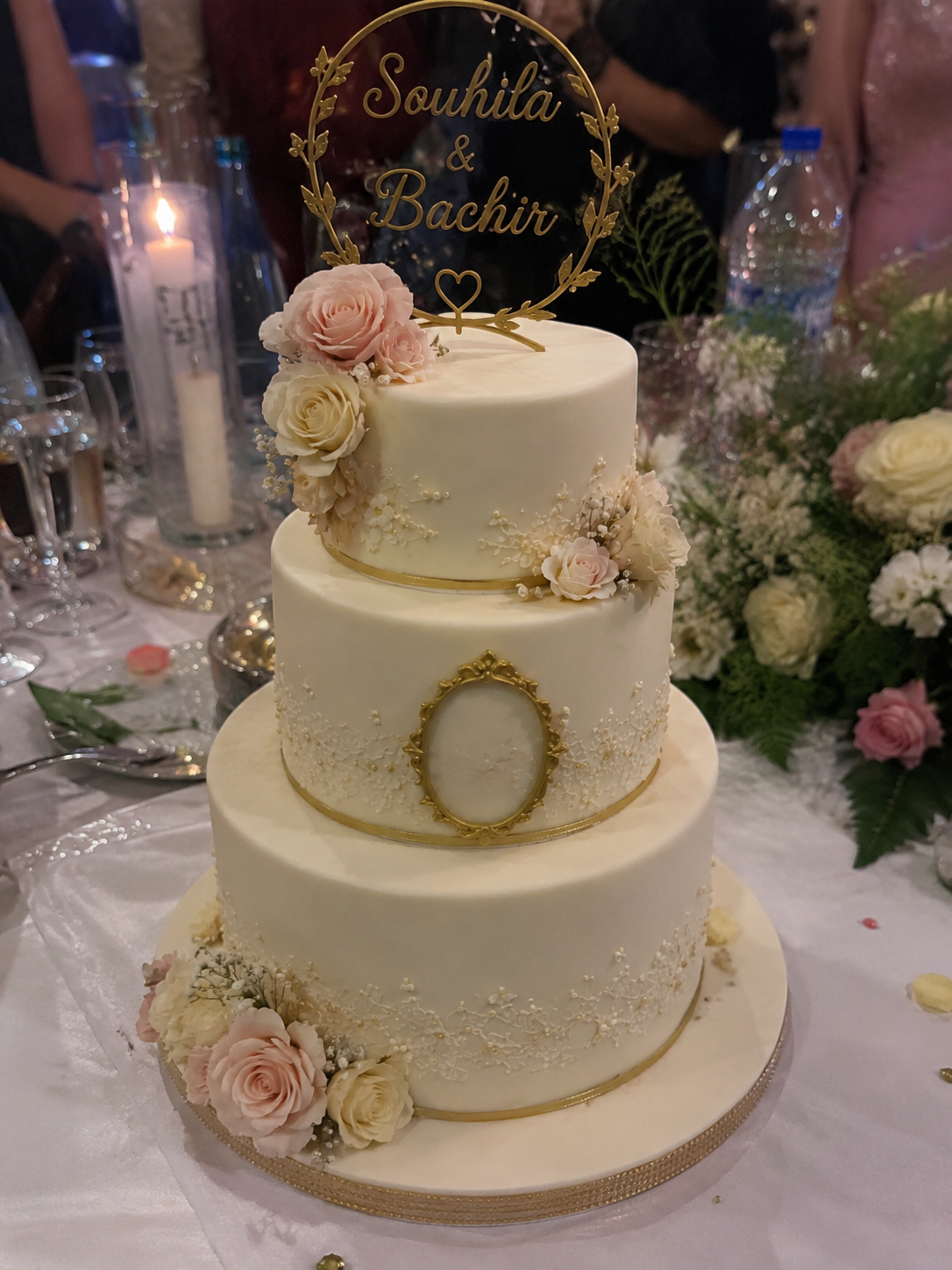
Contemporary wedding cake displayed during a North African wedding reception.

In North African countries such as Algeria, Morocco and Tunisia, wedding celebrations are often accompanied by elaborate dessert displays combining traditional pastries with modern wedding cakes. While Western-style tiered wedding cakes have become increasingly popular since the late 20th century, they are frequently presented alongside regional specialties and ceremonial sweets.

In Algeria, wedding receptions commonly feature a decorative multi-tiered cake known as a pièce montée, often personalized with the names of the bride and groom. Traditional pastries such as makrout, baklava, dziriet, mchewek and griwech are usually served in addition to the wedding cake.

In Morocco, wedding cakes are often displayed during large ceremonial receptions and may accompany trays of pastries including kaab el ghzal (gazelle horns), chebakia and various almond-based sweets. Contemporary Moroccan wedding cakes generally follow international pastry trends, featuring fondant decorations, floral arrangements and multiple tiers.

In Tunisia, wedding celebrations traditionally emphasize confectionery and fine pastries. Modern weddings frequently include a Western-style wedding cake, while local specialties such as baklawa, yoyo and almond pastries remain an important part of the festivities.

Across North Africa, the wedding cake serves both as a symbolic centerpiece and as a visual expression of hospitality, family prestige and celebration. Large tiered cakes are often presented during the reception, photographed with the newlyweds and later shared among guests.

== Alternatives ==
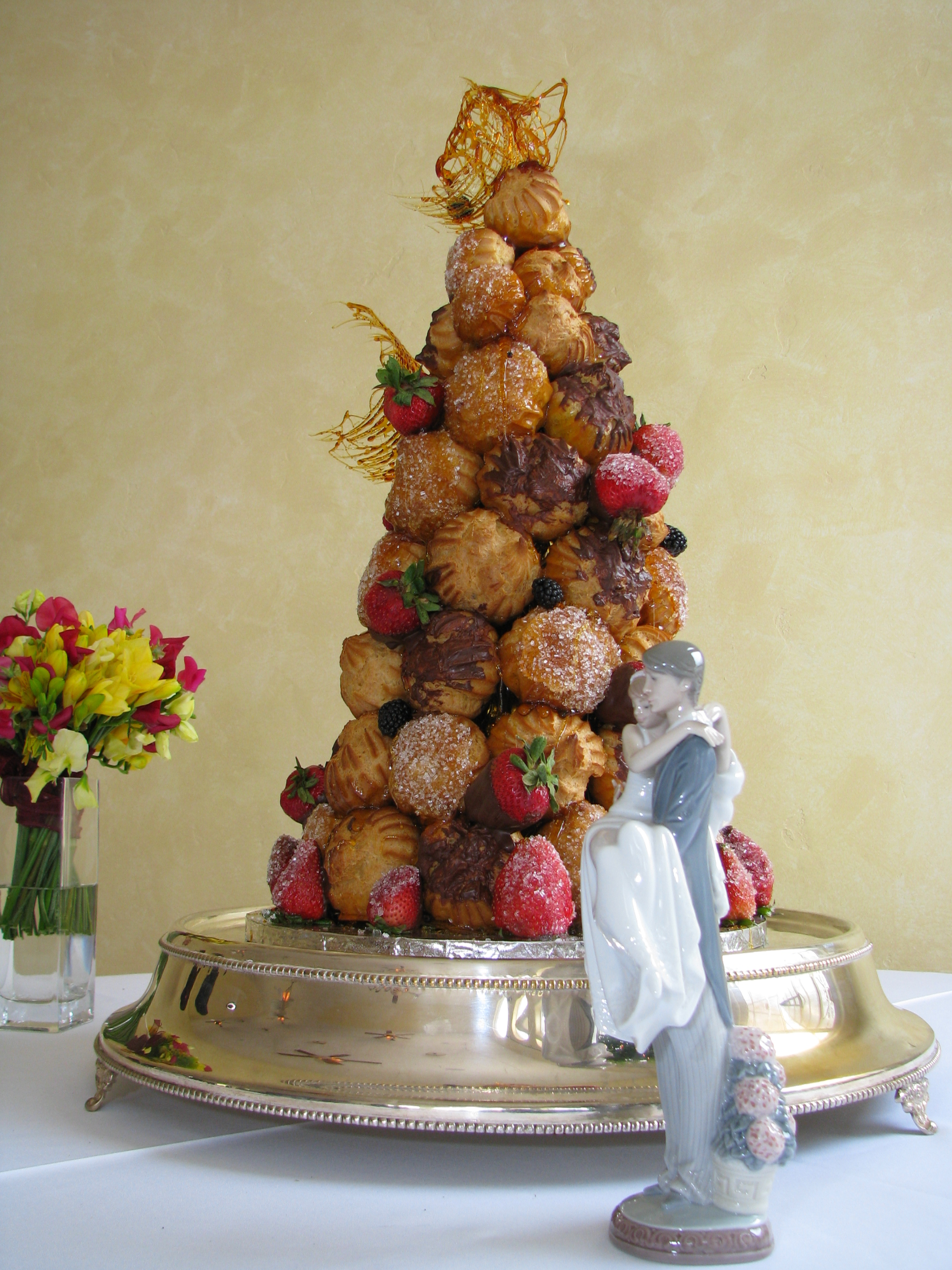
Croquembouche wedding cake

Instead of, or in addition to, a wedding cake, some people prefer to serve other desserts, such as pastries or cookies.

Rather than the multiple tier wedding cake, some wedding parties have stands with multiple tiers where cupcakes are placed, perhaps topped off with a small wedding cake at the top for the ceremonial cake-cutting. Being cheaper than a multi-tiered wedding cake, cupcakes also versatile in that they can have multiple flavors, colors, and designs.

Croquembouche is a complex pastry made of cream puffs and caramelized sugar. This pastry is the traditional approach to wedding cake in France.

In Norway and other Scandinavian countries, a pastry called Kransekake is the preferred approach to a wedding cake. This is often made by the family.

Kanom sam kloe is a fried pastry served at Thai weddings. Three balls of dough, made from coconuts and sesame seeds, are fried together. There are superstitions about whether the pieces of dough stay together; if they do, then this is said to portend a successful marriage and at least one child.

== After the wedding ==
In Europe in the 19th century, the cakes baked to serve at the christening of an infant were similar to wedding cakes. Eventually, since the wedding cakes were generally made of fruitcake, which would store well, and because the first baby often arrived within a year or so of the wedding, it became traditional to save the top part of the wedding cake to eat in celebration of the couple's first child. More recently, some people freeze part of the cake and save it until the couple's first wedding anniversary.

== See also ==
- Wedding
- Princess Elizabeth and Philip Mountbatten's wedding cakes
