= Bump =

Bump or bumps may refer to:

== Mathematics ==
- Bump function, a real-valued smooth function on $\mathbb{R}^n$ with compact support

== Arts and entertainment ==
- Bump (dance), a dance from the 1970s disco era
- BUMP (comics), 2007-08 limited edition comic book series

=== Fictional characters ===
- Bobby Bumps, titular character of a series of American silent animated short films produced (1915–1925)
- Bump (Transformers), a fictional character in the Transformers universe
- Mr. Bump, a Mr. Men character

=== Music ===
- "The Bump", a funky song by the Commodores from Machine Gun (1974)
- "The Bump", a 1974 hit single by the band Kenny
- Bump (album), a jazz album recorded by musician John Scofield in 2000
- "Bump", a song by Raven-Symoné from This Is My Time
- "Bump", a song by Fun Lovin' Criminals from Loco
- "Bump", a song by Spank Rock from YoYoYoYoYo
- "Bump", a song by Rehab from Graffiti the World
- "Bump", a song by Baby Blue from No Smoke Without Fire
- "Bump", a song by Brockhampton from Saturation
- "Bump", a 2006 song by Spank Rock

=== Television ===
- Bump!, a Canadian gay and lesbian travel and lifestyle television series
- Bump, a pricing game on The Price Is Right television game show
- Bump (Australian TV series), a 2021 Australian streaming television drama series
- Bump (British TV series), a 1990 British children's animated programme featuring an elephant

== Culture ==
- Elbow bump, an informal greeting where two people touch or tap elbows
- Fist bump, an informal greeting
- The bumps, a birthday tradition

== Infrastructure and industry ==
- Bump, airline travel slang for the involuntary denial of boarding to passengers on an overbooked flight
- Bump (union), in a unionised work environment, a reassignment of jobs on the basis of seniority
- Bumper music or bump, in radio broadcasting a short clip of music used for transitions between program elements
- Coal mine bump, a seismic jolt occurring within a mine

== People ==
- Bump (nickname)
- Bump (surname)

== Sport ==
- Bump (football), a body contact alternative to a tackle and shepherding method in Australian rules football
- Bump (game), a basketball elimination game
- Bump (professional wrestling), making actual contact with another individual, an object, or the ground
- Bump, an alternative name for moguls in mogul skiing
- Bumps race, a type of rowing competition

== Other uses ==
- Bump (application), a popular app for the iPhone and Android smartphones which allowed users to easily share information
- Bump (Internet), a term for moving a thread to the top of a forum
- The Bump, a knoll on South Georgia Island; see Fortuna Bay
- Bumps River, in Centerville, Cape Cod, Massachusetts, U.S.

== See also ==
- "Bump Bump!", 2009 single from BoA
- "Bump, Bump, Bump", a 2003 single by B2K featuring P. Diddy
- Speed bump, a raised portion of road designed to slow traffic
- "Bumped" (song), by Right Said Fred
- Bumper (disambiguation)
- Bumpy (disambiguation)
- Bumping (disambiguation)
