= Bumpin' =

Bumpin' may refer to:

- Bumpin' (Wes Montgomery album), 1965
- Bumpin' (Dis-n-Dat album), 1994

== See also ==
- Bumping (disambiguation)
