= Bumpers (name) =

Bumpers is a surname. It may refer to:

- Betty Bumpers (1925–2018), American activist, First Lady of Arkansas, from 1971 to 1975 as wife of Dale Bumpers
- Dale Bumpers (1925–2016), American politician, Governor of Arkansas (1971–1975), Senator (1975–1999)

== See also ==
- Dale Bumpers College of Agricultural, Food and Life Sciences
- Bumper (disambiguation)
