= Birthday customs and celebrations =

Rituals for celebrating birthdays around the World

There are many and varied customs associated with the celebration of birthdays around the world.

== Birthday cakes ==
The birthday cake is traditionally highly decorated, and typically covered with lit candles when presented, the number of candles signifying the age of the celebrant. The person whose birthday it is may make a silent wish and then blow out the candles. It is also common for the person celebrating their birthday to cut the initial piece of the cake as a newlywed couple might with a wedding cake. The birthday boy/girl traditionally gets to eat the first piece of the cake.

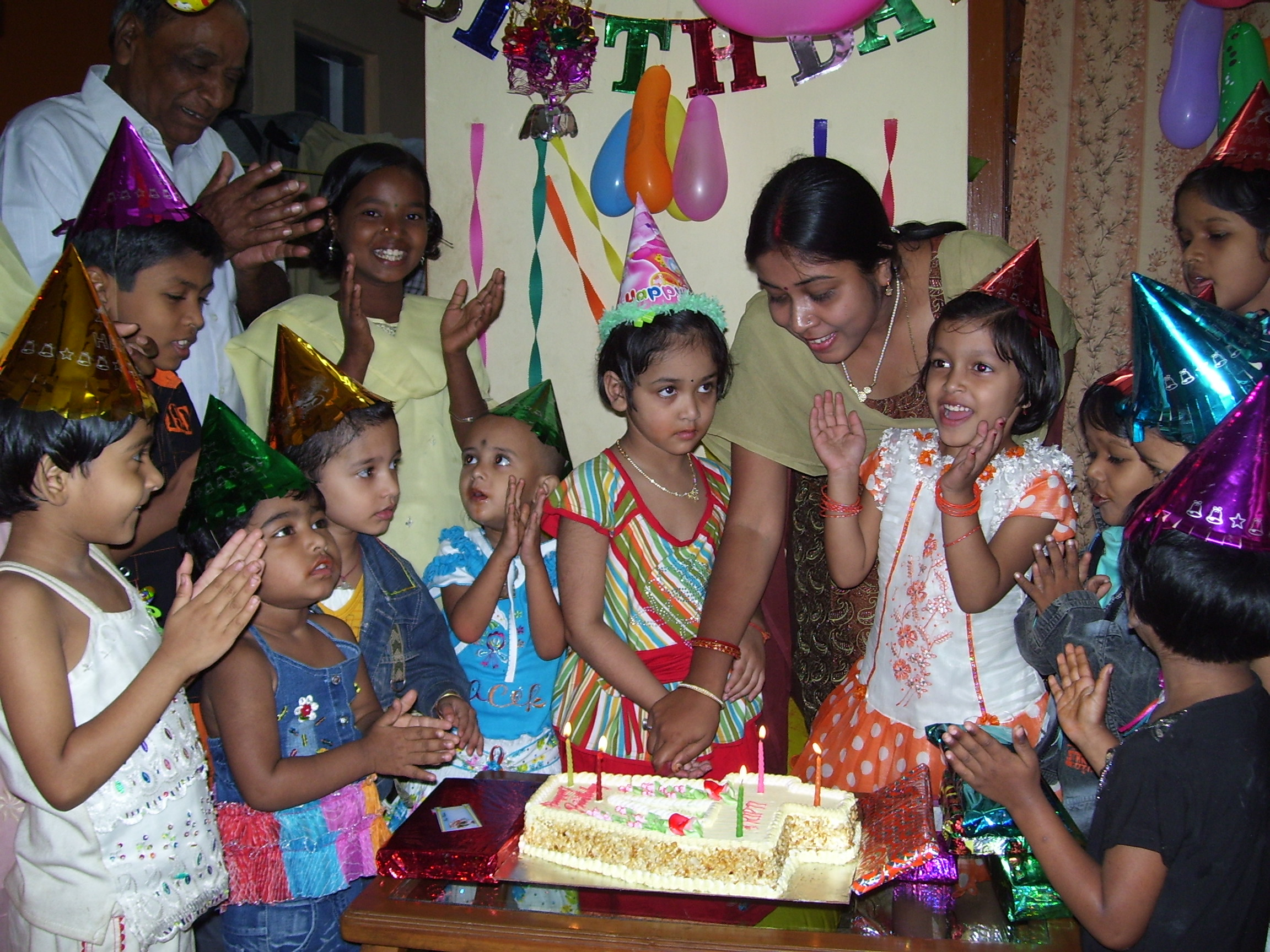
A child's birthday celebration, complete with cake

== Birthday parties ==
In Western cultures, particularly in the United Kingdom, United States and Australia, birthday parties are often accompanied by colorful decorations, such as balloons and streamers. A birthday cake is often served with candles that are to be blown out after a "birthday wish" has been made. While the birthday cake is being brought to the table, the song "Happy Birthday to You" is sung by the guests. A practice most common among wealthy people and celebrities, but engaged in by many others as well, is to hire an event management agency to organize a birthday party.

A child's birthday party may be held at the family's home or in a public place. Soft drinks are often had alongside water and both sweet and savory foods are typically served to the guests. In many cultures, a birthday cake is served. Birthday parties for children often feature entertainment, costumes, party games, and a theme. Adults' birthday parties in Western countries are often held in restaurants, bars, nightclubs, or at home. A birthday party usually includes gifts for the person whose birthday it is.

In Israel, part of the birthday celebration for a child in kindergarten is to lift the decorated chair that the child sits on into the air several times, once for each year of the child's age, plus "one for the next year".

== Birthday presents ==
In addition to parties, it is common for people to receive gifts on their birthday. Popular gifts include toys, books, jewellery, clothes, flowers, technical devices, gift cards, checks, paper money, etc. Items such as underwear and socks are generally not as well appreciated by younger children, even if they are emblazoned with popular characters. Sometimes it is expected of the person celebrating their birthday to treat their party guests instead; this varies depending on the local culture and may involve party gifts or other gestures, for example inviting the guests to the restaurant or bar (some of them offer special birthday programs), arranging parties at home, or at work. In South Africa, however, birthdays are highly celebrated. In a given town or township, everyone is invited, including the older family members; it does not matter how young or old the person is. These celebrations are noted by big white tents being erected in the yards, which symbolize a huge celebration of some sort. Birthday presents range from gifts such as toys to animal sacrifices.

== Birthday greetings ==
In most English-speaking countries it is traditional to sing the song "Happy Birthday to You" to the honored person celebrating a birthday. Happy Birthday songs are common worldwide; similar songs exist in other languages. This song is a common greeting used on birthdays, along with birthday cards and verbal greetings with messages such as "I wish you a Happy Birthday" or "Happy Birthday".

== Punches, bumps, spankings, and other birthday taunts ==
"The bumps", or "the dumps" in Scotland, a birthday torment common in countries such as the UK, Ireland, and Canada, involves the friends and family of the person whose birthday it is taking him or her by the arms and legs, and "bumping" him/her up into the air and down onto the floor. The number of "bumps" given equals the age of the person in years plus one "for luck". Usually "the Bumps" are administered only to children, in part because as people grow up they become too heavy for the process. Sometimes bumps are also referred to as kicks where the person celebrating their birthday is held by their arms and legs and their friends kick them. This practice is often disapproved in regard to health and safety concerns.

In French-speaking Canada, the U.S. and Australia, "birthday punches" are given in a similar fashion, with the person whose birthday it is being punched a number of times equal to his/her age, often with one additional punch "for luck". In some places, instead of a punch "for luck", the recipient is pinched "to grow an inch". In Brazil, Hungary, Spain, Argentina, Italy, and other countries, the person has his/her earlobes pulled. The Hungarian tradition also involves at the same time as pulling the earlobes wishing the person a happy birthday or reciting a rhyme whose English translation is "God bless you, live so long so your ears reach your ankles.".

In Mexico and Venezuela, a widespread custom is to attempt the pushing of the person's face into the birthday cake when they blow out the candles. This frequently destroys the cake.

Birthday punches are administered throughout the day, but if the "birthday boy" hides from the punches, one final punch is allowed to be given.
