= Bumper =

Bumper or Bumpers may refer to:

== People ==
- Betty Bumpers (1925-2018), American activist, First Lady of Arkansas, wife of Dale Bumpers
- Dale Bumpers (1925–2016), American politician, governor of Arkansas and senator
- Bumper Robinson (born 1974), American actor and voice actor
- Bumper Tormohlen (1937–2018), American National Basketball Association player and coach

== Arts and entertainment ==
- Bumpers (album), a rock music sampler by Island Records
- "Bumper", a song by Julio Voltio
- Bumper (broadcasting), a short transitional segment
- Bumper, a type of obstacle in pinball
- Hit and Run (2009 film), a horror film also known as Bumper
- Bumper, a bulldog in the American comic strip The Middletons
- Bumper the Badger, a character in the video game Diddy Kong Racing
- Bumper, a character in Johnny Test

== Technology and transportation ==
- Bumper (car), a part for absorbing impact
- Buffer stop or bumper, a stopping device on railroads
- RTV-G-4 Bumper, an American sounding rocket
- Bumper (company), fintech platform

== Other uses ==
- USS Bumper (SS-333), a US Navy submarine
- Two game fish in the family Carangidae:
  - Atlantic bumper (Chloroscombrus chrysurus)
  - Pacific bumper (Chloroscombrus orqueta)
- Bumper race, a type of horse race
- Bumper cars, aka Dodgems, a type of amusement ride
- Crib bumper, a cushion in an infant bed
- Bumper knot, used in fishing to secure bait
- Automatic watch § Bumper, an early type of self-winding mechanism in automatic watches

== See also ==
- Bumper v. North Carolina, a US Supreme Court case decided in 1968
- Bumper crop, a crop that has yielded an unusually productive harvest
- BMPER, a human protein
- Bump (disambiguation)
