= Bumpy =

Bumpy may refer to:

== People ==
- Bumpy Bumpus (1914–1946), American racing driver
- Bumpy Johnson (1905–1968), African-American mob boss
- Burwell Jones (1933–2021), American swimmer
- Bumpy Kanahele, Hawaiian nationalist leader
- Bumpy Knuckles, a stage name of American rapper and record producer James Campbell (born 1969)
- Bumpy (singer), stage name of 21st century Australian singer Amy Dowd

== Arts and entertainment ==
- Bumpy (Legends of Chima), a character in Legends of Chima
- Mr. Bumpy, a character in the television series Bump in the Night
- Bumpy (video game), a 1989 platform game

== See also ==
- Bump (disambiguation)
