= Kagemand =

Danish celebration cake

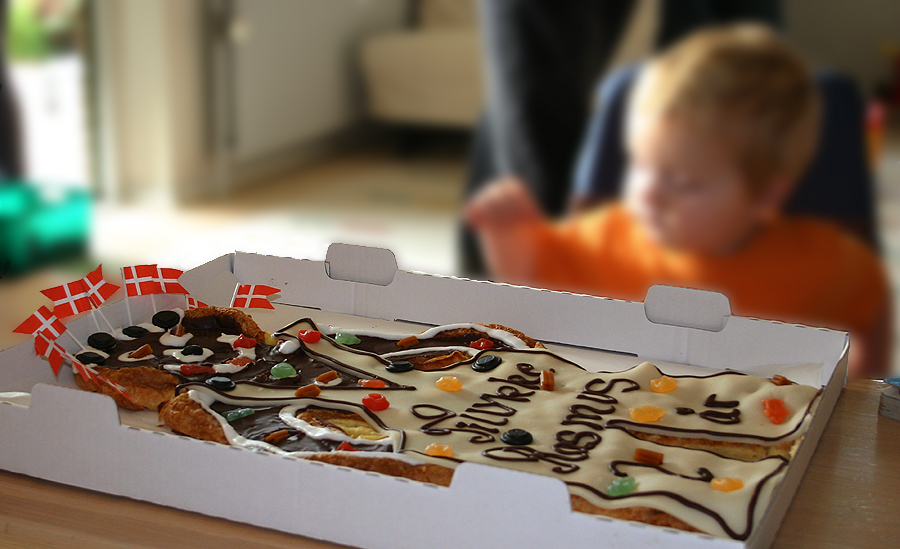
- A Kagemand that reads "Tillykke Rasmus 2 år" (transl. Happy Birthday Rasmus, 2 years)
- Alternative names: Kagekone, Kageperson
- Type: Birthday cake
- Course: Dessert
- Place of origin: Denmark
- Associated cuisine: Danish cuisine
- Main ingredients: cake, candy, icing

Kagemand or kagekone (lit. 'cake man' or 'cake woman') is a Danish cake in the shape of a person which is traditionally eaten at birthdays, and in some cases, other anniversaries. Gender-neutral versions of the cake are called kageperson (lit. 'cake person').

The kagemand is rooted within Danish culture. They are prepared by decorating a cake base to represent the person who is being celebrated. When served, the cake figure is often decapitated or dismembered, while guests feign horror at the act.

== Preparation ==
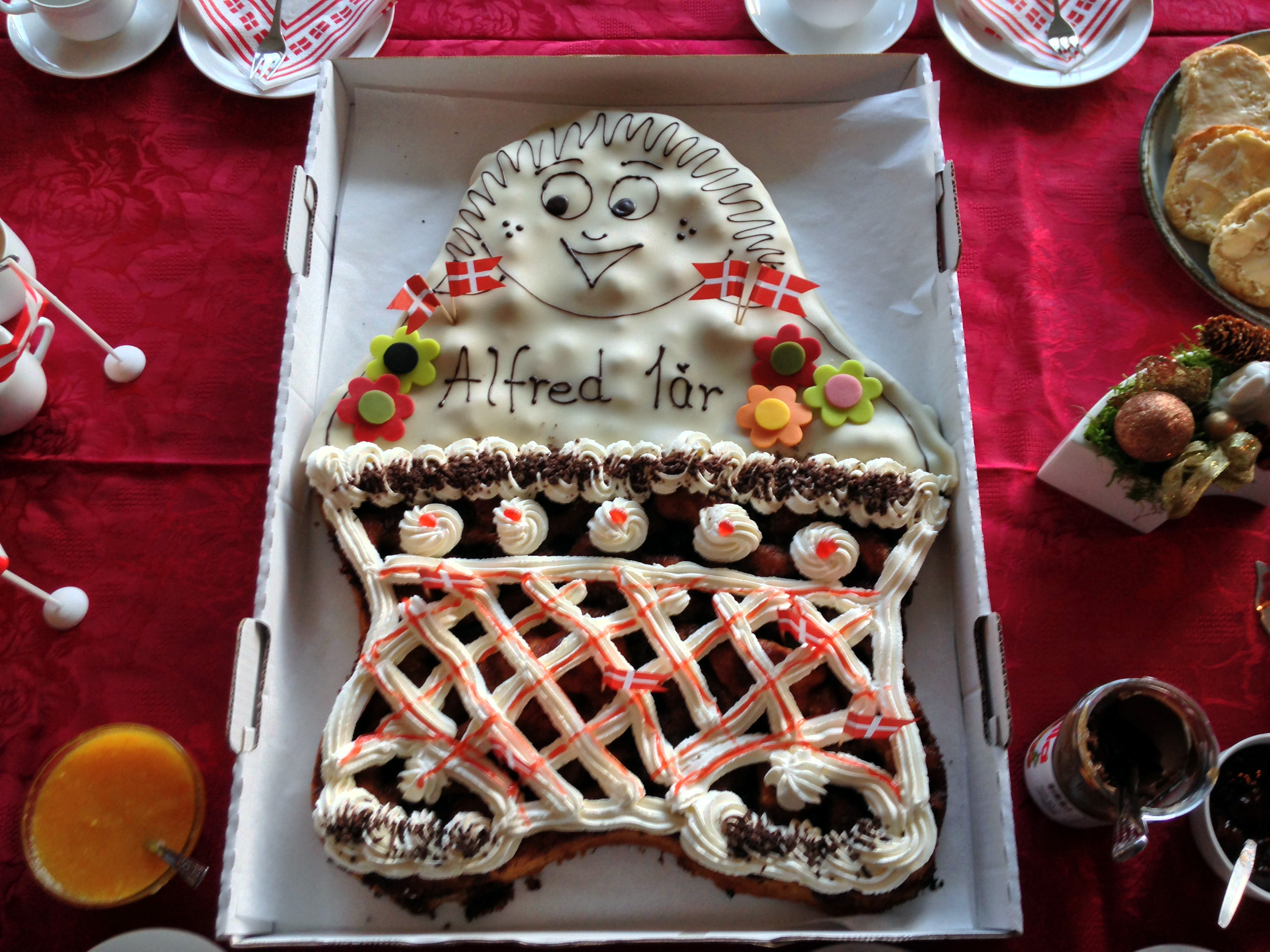
Kagemand served at a boy's birthday party

Typically, the cake is prepared using Brunsviger, a Danish yeasted cake covered in a brown sugar topping, as its base. Choux pastry, danish pastry, and sweet roll bases are also common. Bakeries in Denmark sell versions of the cake with an even larger variety of bases, including hindbærsnitte and cinnamon roll.

Regardless of the base used, the cake is prepared as usual, then typically topped with either a brown sugar mixture or an icing glacé. The kagemand is then decorated with candy and festive Danish flags. Fondant, icing, and other sweets may also be used as decoration.

Traditionally, these cakes are designed to look like the person that is celebrating their birthday. More modern versions may incorporate their interests or look like popular characters. Danish smørrebrød platters, which are also often prepared for celebrations, may be alternatively used to created a savory stand-in for the traditional kagemand, called a pålægsmand or pålægskone.
