= Bump (surname) =

Bump is the surname of:

- Hulda Pierce Warren Bump and Mercy Lavinia Warren Bump, birth names of dwarf entertainers and sisters Minnie Warren (1849–1878) and Lavinia Warren (1841–1919) respectively, the latter the wife of "General Tom Thumb"
- Alex Bump (born 2003), American ice hockey player
- Daniel Bump (born 1952), American mathematician
- Menzus R. Bump (1838–1913), American politician
- Nate Bump (born 1976), American Major League Baseball pitcher
- Suzanne M. Bump (born 1956), American politician and first female Massachusetts State Auditor
