= Bump (nickname) =

Bump or Bumps is a nickname for:

- Robert Blackwell (1918–1985), American bandleader, songwriter, arranger and record producer nicknamed "Bumps"
- Bump Cooper Jr. (born 2001), American football player
- Bump Elliott (1925–2019), American college football player, coach, and athletic administrator
- Bump Hadley (1904–1963), American Major League Baseball pitcher
- Bump Wills (born 1952), American Major League Baseball second basemen
