= Bumping =

Bumping may refer to:

== Processes ==
- Bumping (chemistry), the irregular boiling of a liquid
- Lock bumping, a lock picking technique
- Thread bumping on an Internet forum
- Bumping trains, a slang term used in the UK to describe fare evasion
- Bumping rights, a provision in collective bargaining agreements

== Places ==
- Bumping Lake, Washington state, United States
- Bumping River, which flows into Bumping Lake

== See also ==
- Bump (disambiguation)
