= Bumper (company) =

British financial technology company

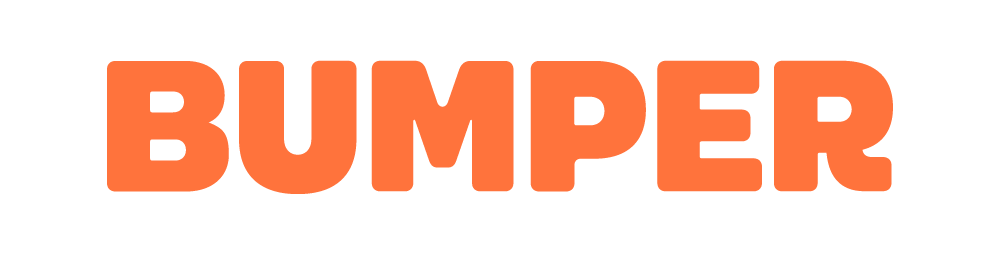
- Company type: Private company
- Industry: Software
- Founded: 2013; 12 years ago
- Founder: James Jackson; Jack Allman
- Headquarters: Sheffield, United Kingdom
- Products: Car finance
- Website: bumper.co

Bumper is a British financial technology company based in Sheffield, England. It provides a digital payment platform to car dealerships that provides car financing for repairs.

== History ==
Bumper was founded in 2013 by James Jackson and Jack Allman as Auto Service Finance.

In 2021, Bumper expanded its operations to Ireland and later to Germany and Spain in 2022.

In 2022, Bumper moved its headquarters from London to Sheffield.

In 2021, it received £9 million from Autotech Ventures, Porsche Ventures, and Jaguar Land Rover's InMotion Ventures. In 2024, Bumper received further investment of £40 million from multiple investors, including Shell Ventures, Jaguar Land Rover's InMotion Ventures, and Porsche Ventures.

== Locations ==
Bumper is headquartered in Sheffield, South Yorkshire, England. It has additional offices in London and Ankara.

== Platform ==
Bumper provides a digital payment platform to car dealerships to facilitate transactions related to car repairs which includes open banking. With open banking, customers can pay their bill directly from their account to the garage's account. It's like a bank transfer but you don't need to enter their bank details, you get a notification in your online banking app and approve the payment from there.

A user can receive detailed invoices for repair work, which include options to pay in full or through an interest-free installment plan, similar to other buy now, pay later services.
