= Birthday cake =

Dessert served to celebrate a birthday

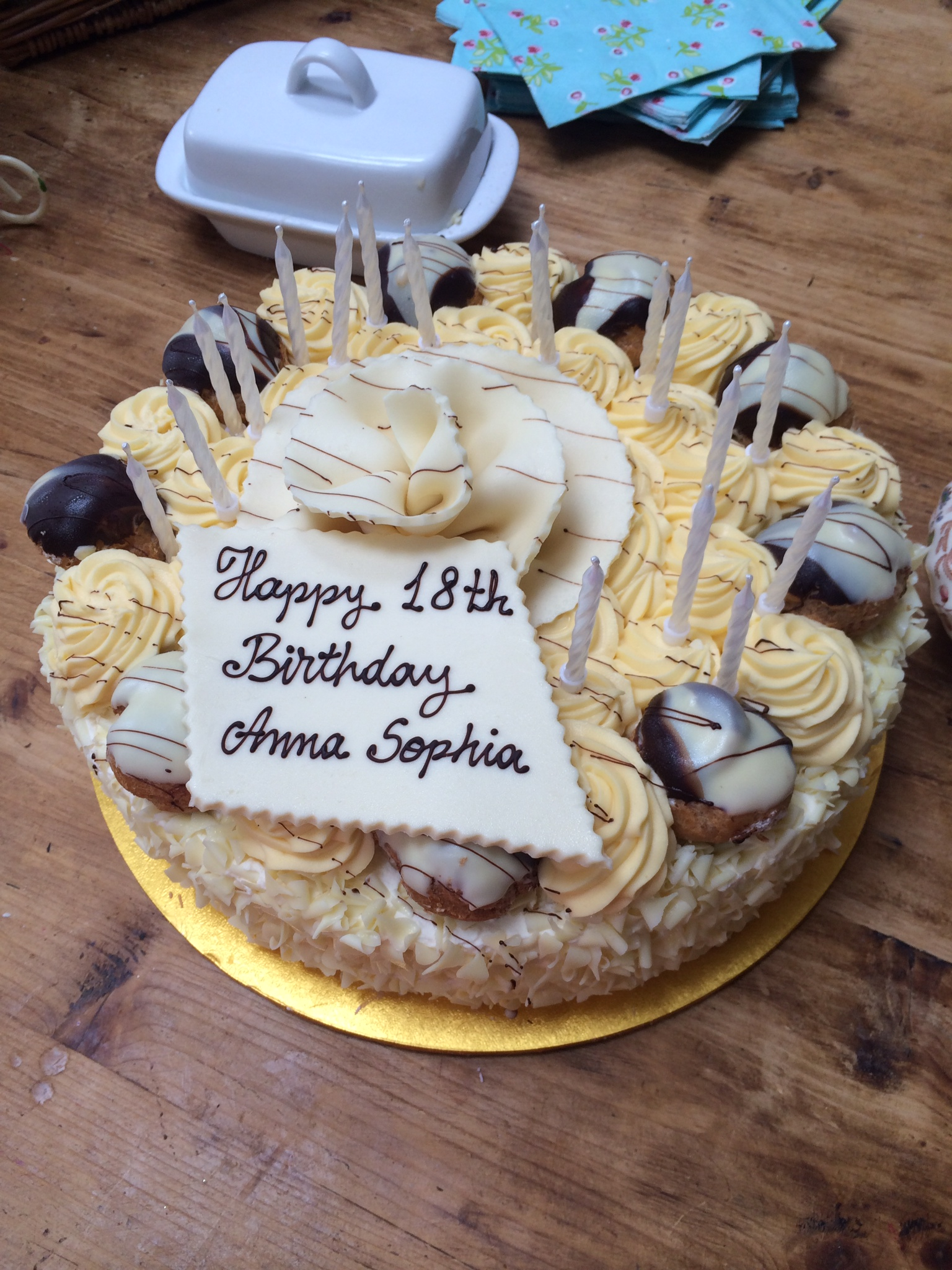
Birthday cake with 18 candles for the celebrant's 18th birthday

A birthday cake is a cake eaten as part of birthday celebrations. While there is no standard for birthday cakes, they are typically highly decorated layer cakes covered in frosting, often featuring birthday wishes ("Happy birthday") followed by the celebrant's name. In many cultures, it is also customary to serve the birthday cake with small lit candles on top, especially in the case of a child's birthday. The cake often accompanies the singing of "Happy Birthday to You". Variations include cupcakes, cake pops, pastries, and tarts.

== History ==
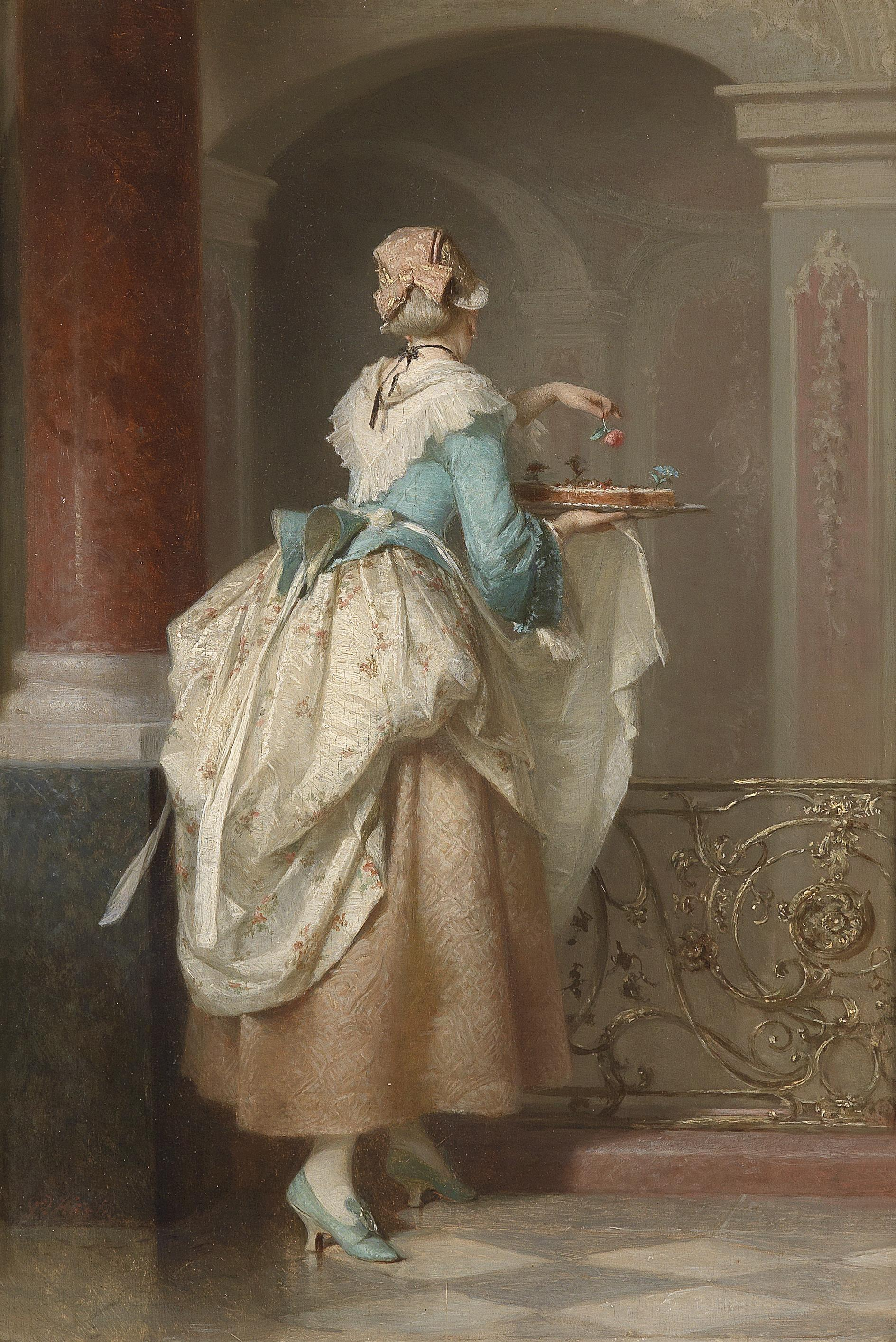
The Birthday Cake by 19th-century German genre painter Pancraz Körle.

Birthday cakes have been a part of birthday celebrations in Western European countries since at least the middle of the 19th century. However, the link between cakes and birthday celebrations may date back to ancient Roman times; in classical Roman culture, cakes were occasionally served at special birthdays and at weddings. These were circles made from flour and nuts, leavened with yeast, and sweetened with honey.

In Germany by the 18th century (then the Holy Roman Empire), the tradition of celebrating birthdays with a birthday cake and candles began. One of the most notable occasions there, where using a birthday cake with candles took form, was during Count Ludwig von Zinzendorf of Marienborn's birthday party in 1746. His cake was said to be as big as an oven could make it, with candles stuck in it, marking the years of his age. From the 18th century, elaborate cakes continued to take form, having many aspects of the contemporary birthday cake, like multiple layers, icing, and decorations. However, these cakes were generally only available to the very wealthy. Birthday cakes became accessible to the lower classes as a result of the Industrial Revolution and the spread of more materials and goods.

== Birthday candles and contemporary rites ==
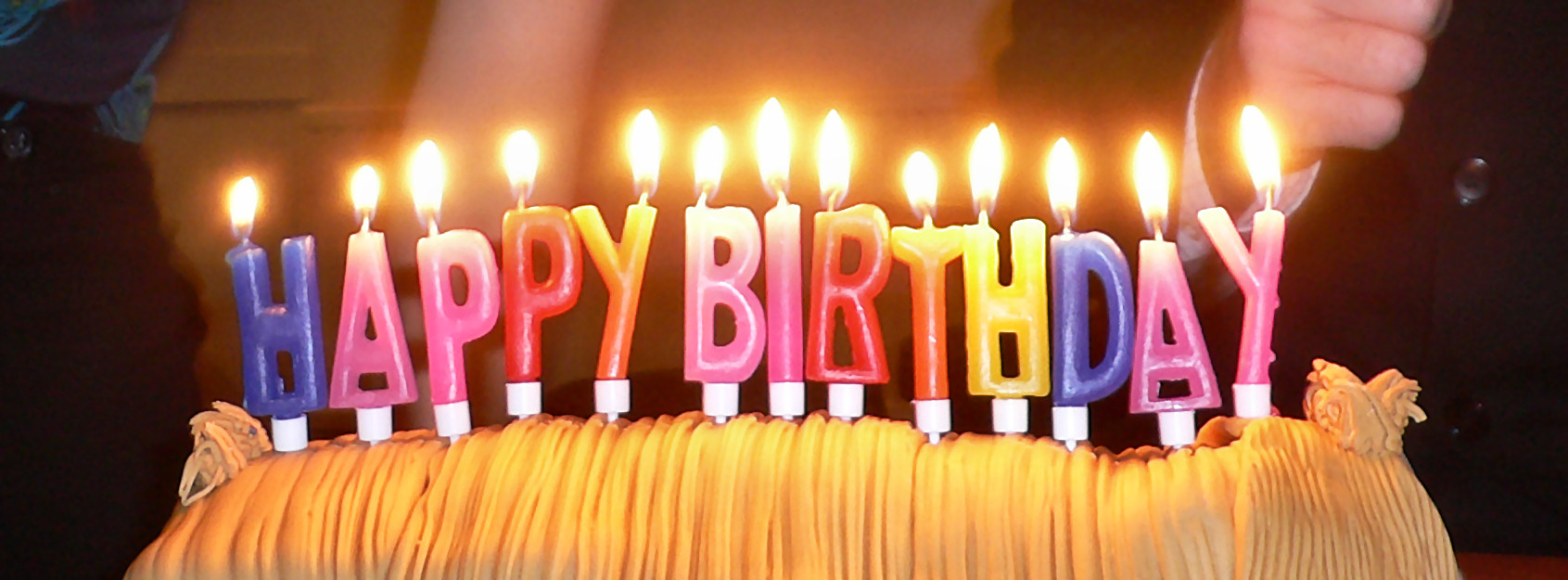
Modern celebration candles spelling out "Happy birthday"

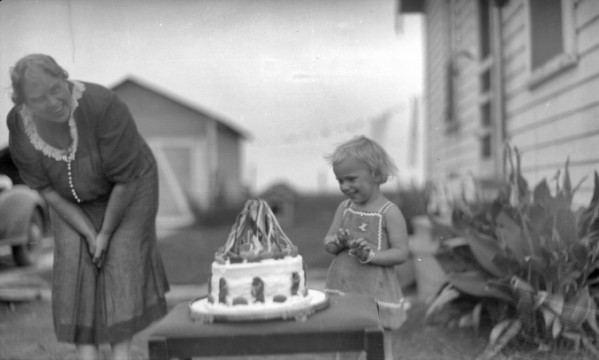
Child with a birthday cake, c. 1930–1940

The practice of serving cake on birthdays is commonplace in many cultures. In contemporary Western cultures, birthday cakes for children are often topped with candles, secured with special holders or simply pressed down into the outer frosting. In the Anglosphere, the number of candles often corresponds to the age of the individual being celebrated, occasionally with one extra for luck. An increasingly popular alternative is to use candles shaped as the numeral digits of the celebrant's age. Sparklers may also be used alongside or instead of the traditional wax candles. Trick candles are also used as birthday candles in pranks.

The cake is usually presented with all the candles lit, at which point it is customary for the guests to sing "Happy Birthday to You" in unison, or an equivalent birthday song appropriate to the country. Upon the conclusion of the song, the celebrant is traditionally prompted to blow out the candles and make a wish, which is thought to come true if all the candles are extinguished in a single breath. Another common superstition holds that the wish must be made in silence, not to be shared with anyone else, or else it will not come true.

=== Theories of origin ===
Though the exact origin of the birthday candle ritual is unknown, there are multiple theories.

One theory is attributed to early Greeks, who used candles to honor the goddess Artemis' birth on the sixth day of every lunar month. The link between her oversight of fertility and the birthday tradition of candles on cakes, however, has not been established.

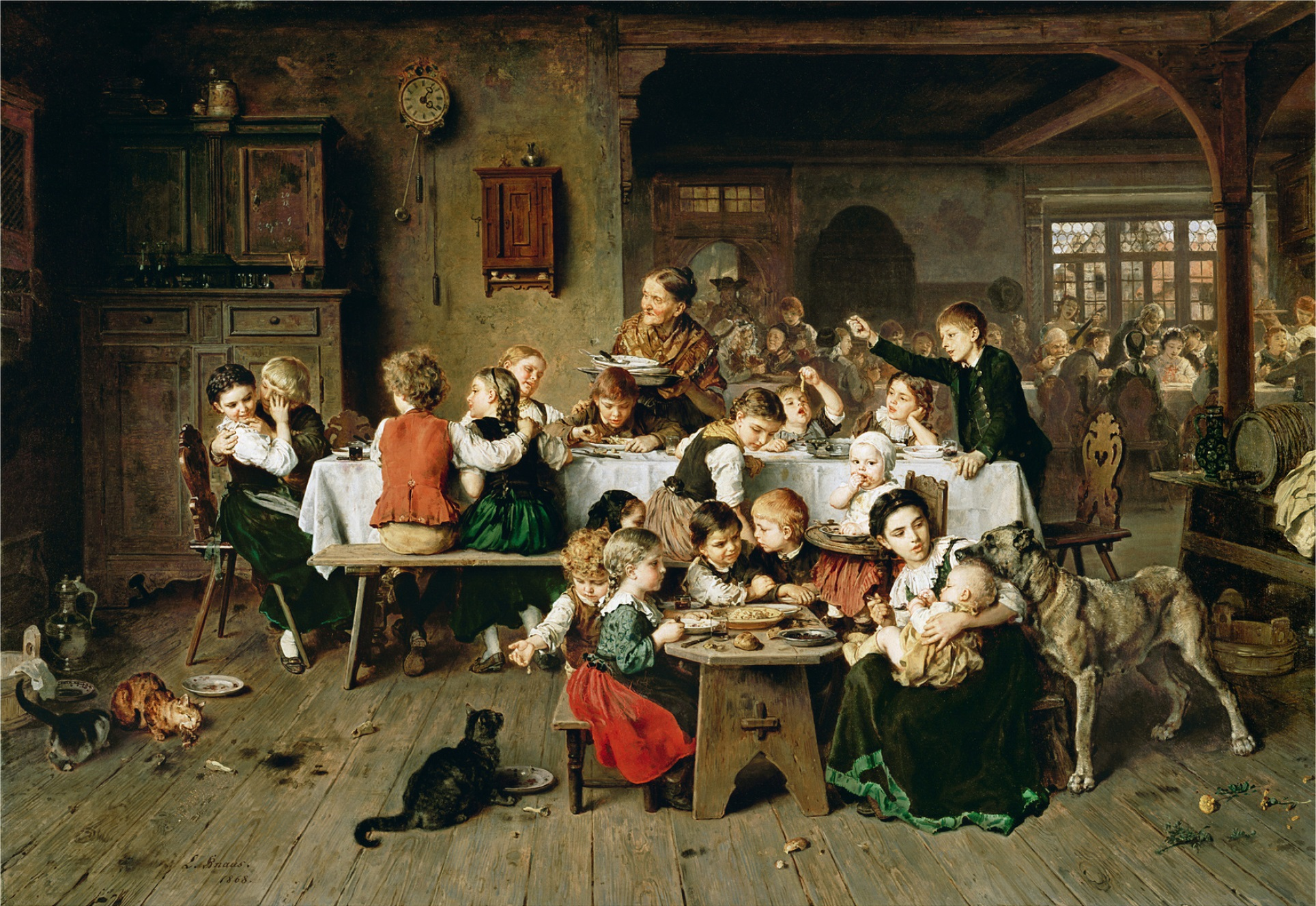
A Kinderfest

In 18th century Germany, the history of candles on cakes can be traced to Kinderfest, a birthday celebration for children. This tradition also makes use of candles and cakes. German children were taken to an auditorium-like space, free to celebrate another year in a place where Germans believed that adults protected children from evil spirits attempting to steal their souls. In those times there was no tradition of bringing gifts to a birthday; guests would merely bring good wishes for the birthday person. However, if a guest did bring gifts it was considered to be a good sign for the person whose birthday it was. Later, flowers became quite popular as a birthday gift.

- In 1746, a large birthday festival was held for Count Ludwig von Zinzendorf at Marienborn near Büdingen. Andrew Frey described the party in detail, mentioning that "there was a Cake as large as any Oven could be found to bake it, and Holes made in the Cake according to the Years of the Person's Age, every one having a Candle stuck into it, and one in the Middle."
- Johann Wolfgang von Goethe, having spent 24–30 August 1801 in Gotha as a guest of Prince August of Saxe-Gotha-Altenburg, recounts of his 52nd birthday on 28 August: "when it was time for dessert, the prince's entire livery in full regalia entered, led by the majordomo. He carried a generous-size torte with colorful flaming candles – amounting to some fifty candles – that began to melt and threatened to burn down, instead of there being enough room for candles indicating upcoming years, as is the case with children's festivities of this kind." As the excerpt indicates, the tradition at the time was to place one candle on the cake for each year of the individual's life, so that the number of candles on top of the cake would represent the age which some one had reached; sometimes a birthday cake would have some added candles 'indicating upcoming years.'

A reference to the tradition of blowing out the candles was documented in Switzerland in 1881. Researchers for the Folk-Lore Journal recorded various "superstitions" among the Swiss middle class. One statement depicted a birthday cake as having lighted candles which correspond to each year of life. These candles were required to be blown out, individually, by the person who is being celebrated.

=== Bacteriology ===
In June 2017 researchers at Clemson University reported that some individuals deposit a large number of bacteria onto the cake frosting when blowing out the candles. They found that on average, the act increased the amount of bacteria by 14 times, but one of the researchers described this as "not a big health concern".

== By culture ==
There are many variations of sweets which are eaten around the world on birthdays. Different cultures have different unique birthday cake traditions.

=== Chinese ===
The Chinese birthday pastry is the shòu bāo (simplified Chinese: 寿包; traditional Chinese: 壽包) or shòu táo bāo (simplified Chinese: 寿桃包; traditional Chinese: 壽桃包), a lotus-paste-filled bun made of wheat flour and shaped and colored to resemble a peach.

=== Russian and Lithuanian ===
In Western Russia, birthday children are served fruit pies with a birthday greeting carved into the crusts. As well in Russia and Lithuania, rather than a birthday cake, Russian adolescents receive a pie with a sweet birthday message that is illustrated with icing on top of the birthday pie.

=== Swedish ===
The Swedish birthday cake is made like a pound cake that is often topped with marzipan and decorated with the national flag.

=== Danish ===
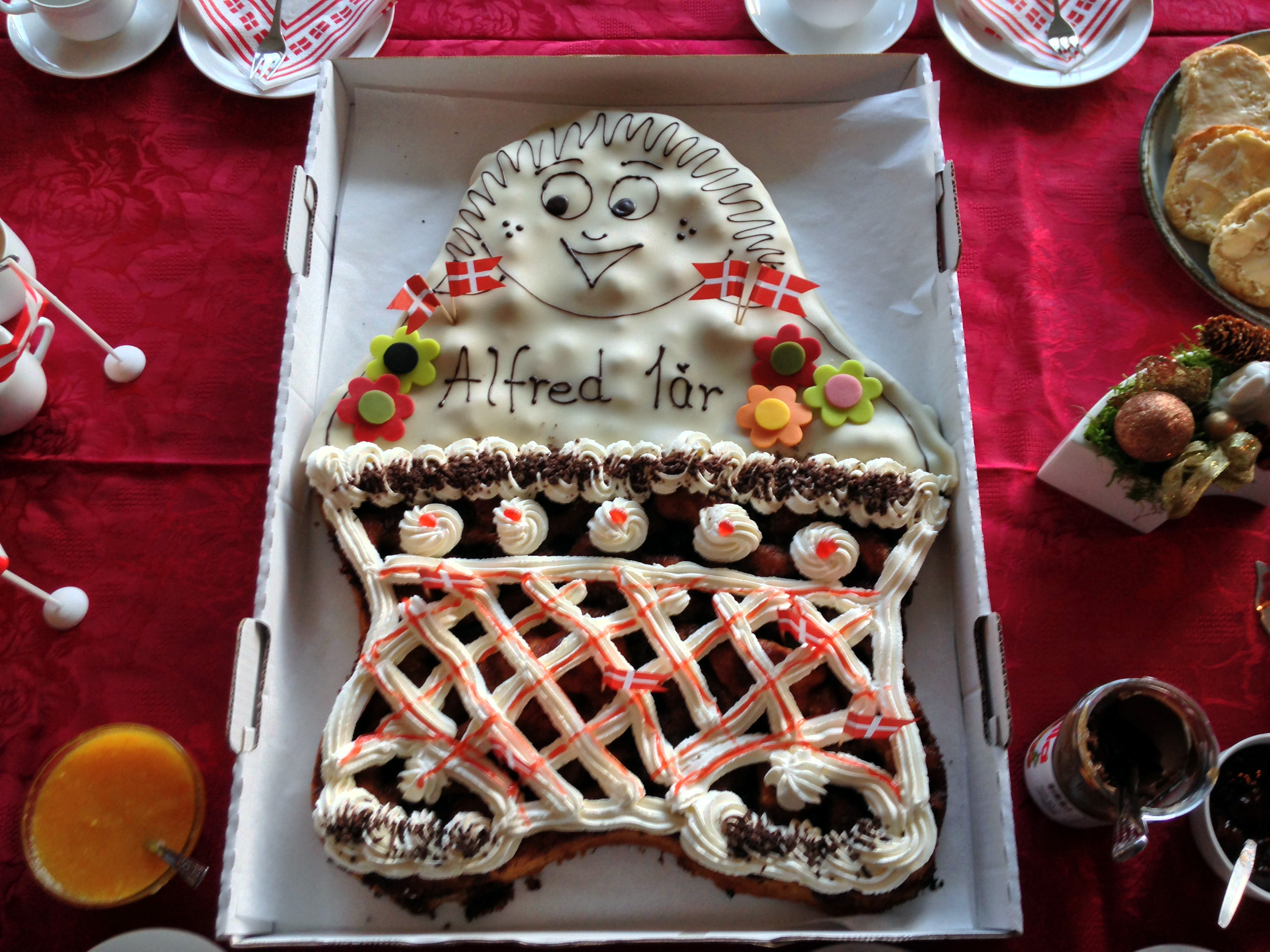
Kagemand served at a boy's birthday party

In Denmark, Kagemand or kagekone are typically prepared for birthdays. The cake is shaped like a person and is decorated with candy and Danish flags to represent the person being celebrated. The cake is not decorated with birthday candles. When served, some Danes begin cutting the cake by decapitating the figure, while guests feign horror at the act.

=== Dutch ===
In southern Netherlands, vlaai, a tart, will be served at the start of the party.

=== English ===
Traditionally an English birthday cake is infused with artifacts that signify importance and good luck when baking the cake. To illustrate, adding a coin into the baking of the cake can represent financial success for the birthday individual. Different artifacts within cake can be used to symbolize a wish for the birthday girl or boy.

=== Egyptian ===
Birthday parties in Egypt consist of two different birthday cakes for the birthday girl or boy. Often only one birthday cake has a set of birthday candles while the other is left untouched. While two birthday cakes are significant in Egyptian culture, other sweet treats can be seen at birthday parties such as cakes known as “ghettos”.

=== Israeli ===
In Israel, individuals celebrate their birthdays with candles on their birthday cakes that align with the number of years the birthday individual was born. As well an additional candle is added to the birthday cake to represent a candle for the following year.

=== American ===
In the United States, cakes carry a candle for each full year the birthday recipient has lived, mirroring German customs. As well, singing happy birthday songs is customary while the candles on the cake are lit. In the 20th century, American culture adopted a customary belief that a birthday want or desire would only be granted if the birthday recipient blew out the candles in one exhale. Birthday cakes are often a kind of white cake or confetti cake in American culture.

== Gallery ==
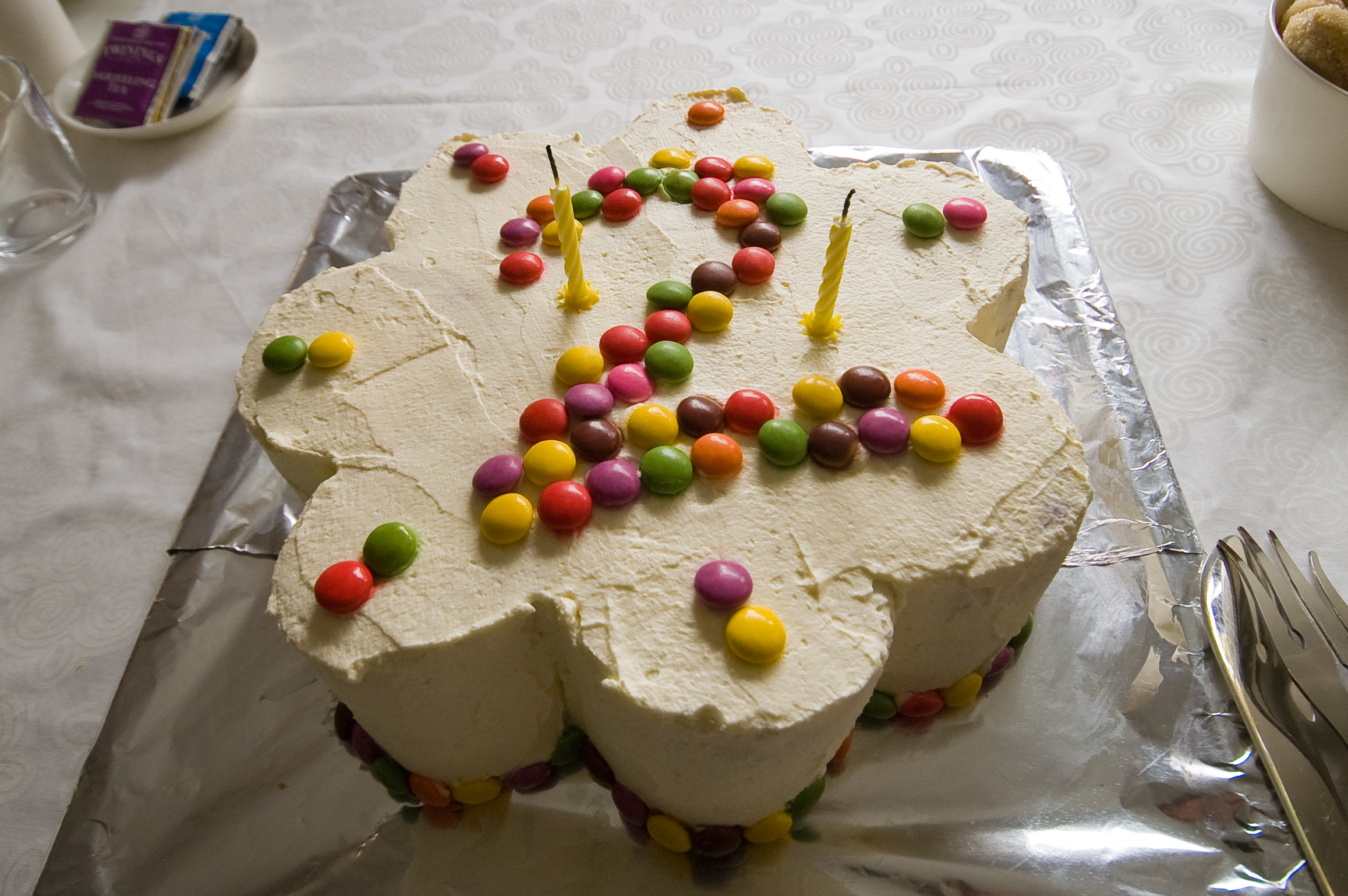
2nd birthday cake

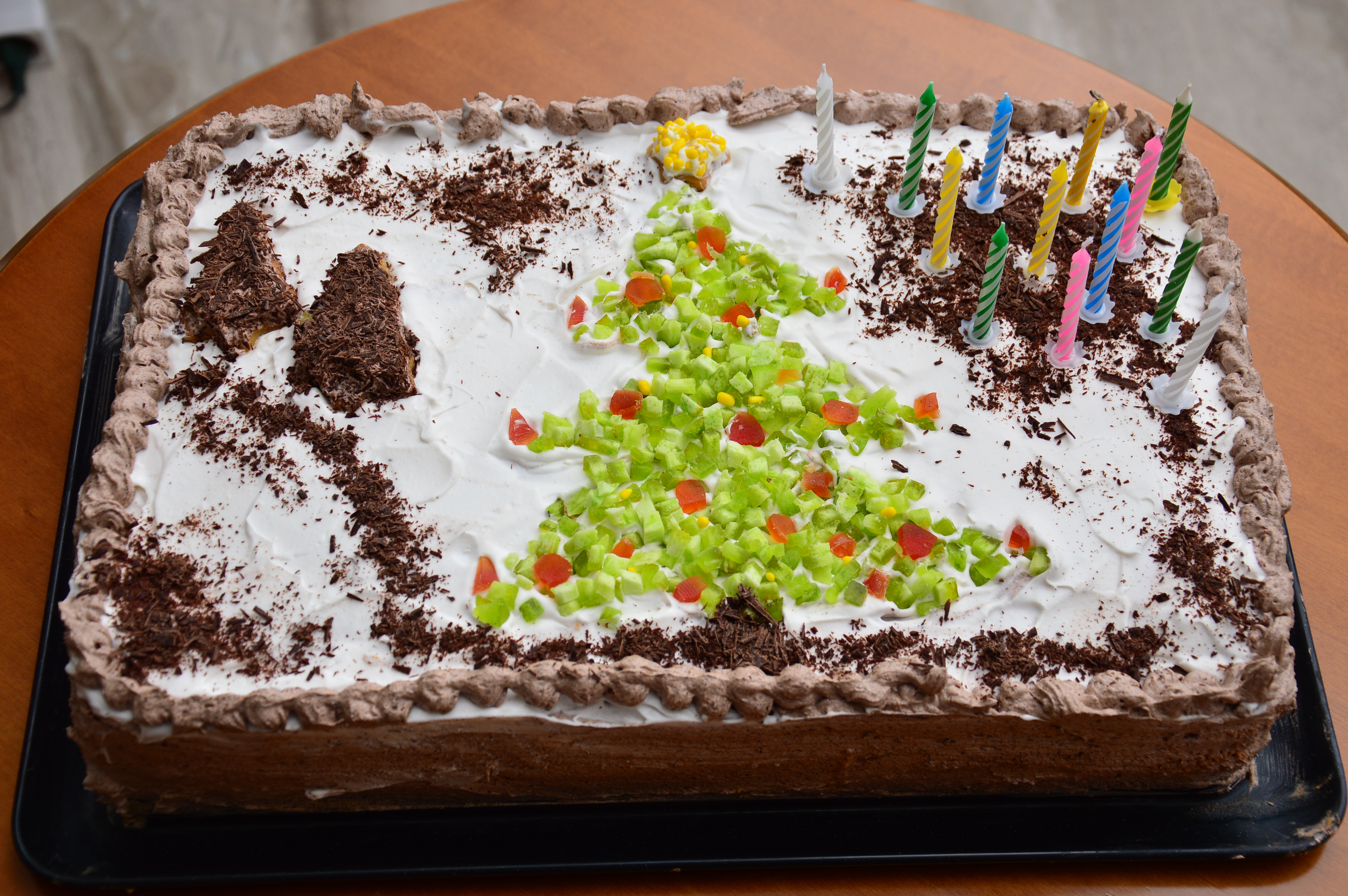
Christmas tree birthday cake

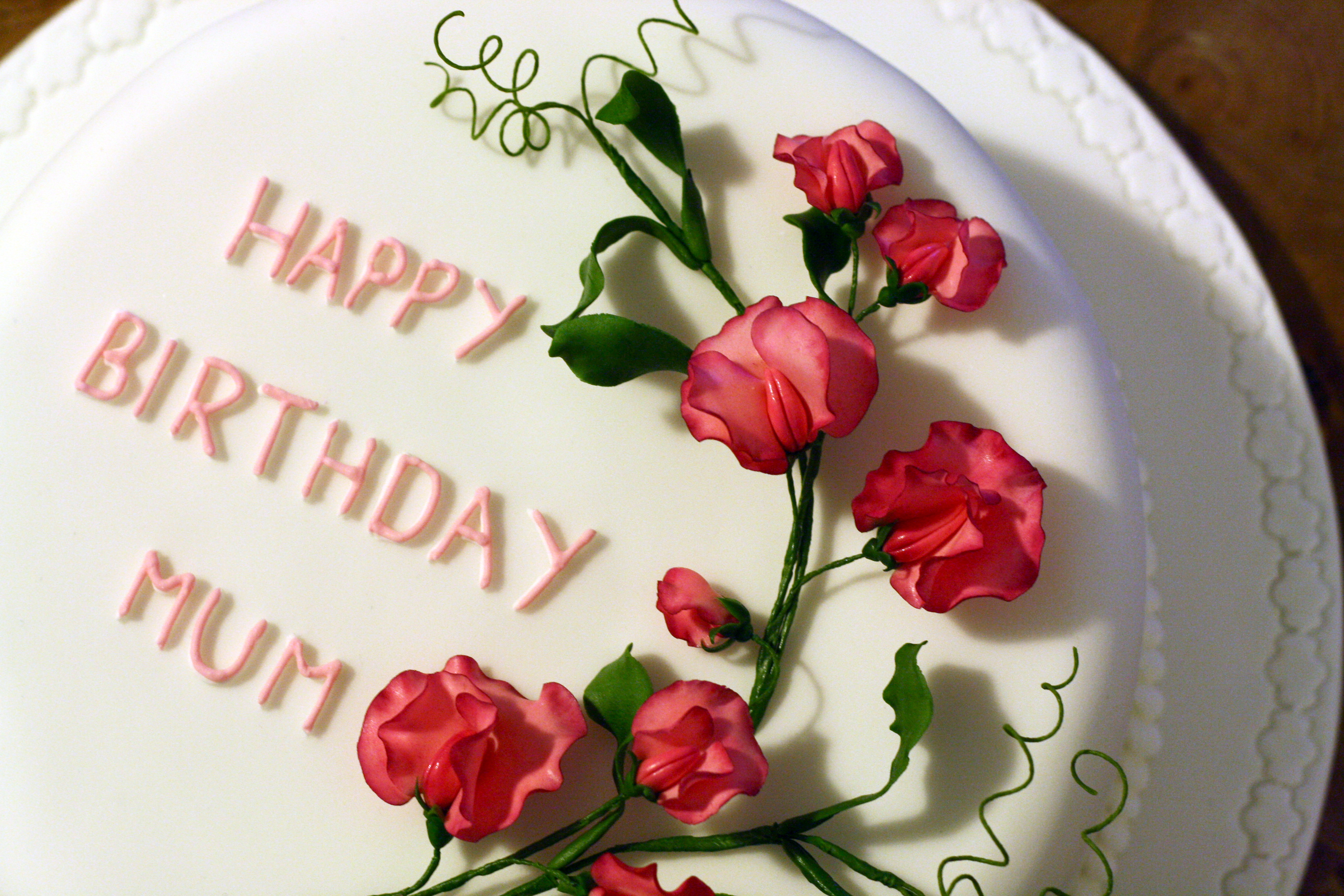
Birthday cake with a written message

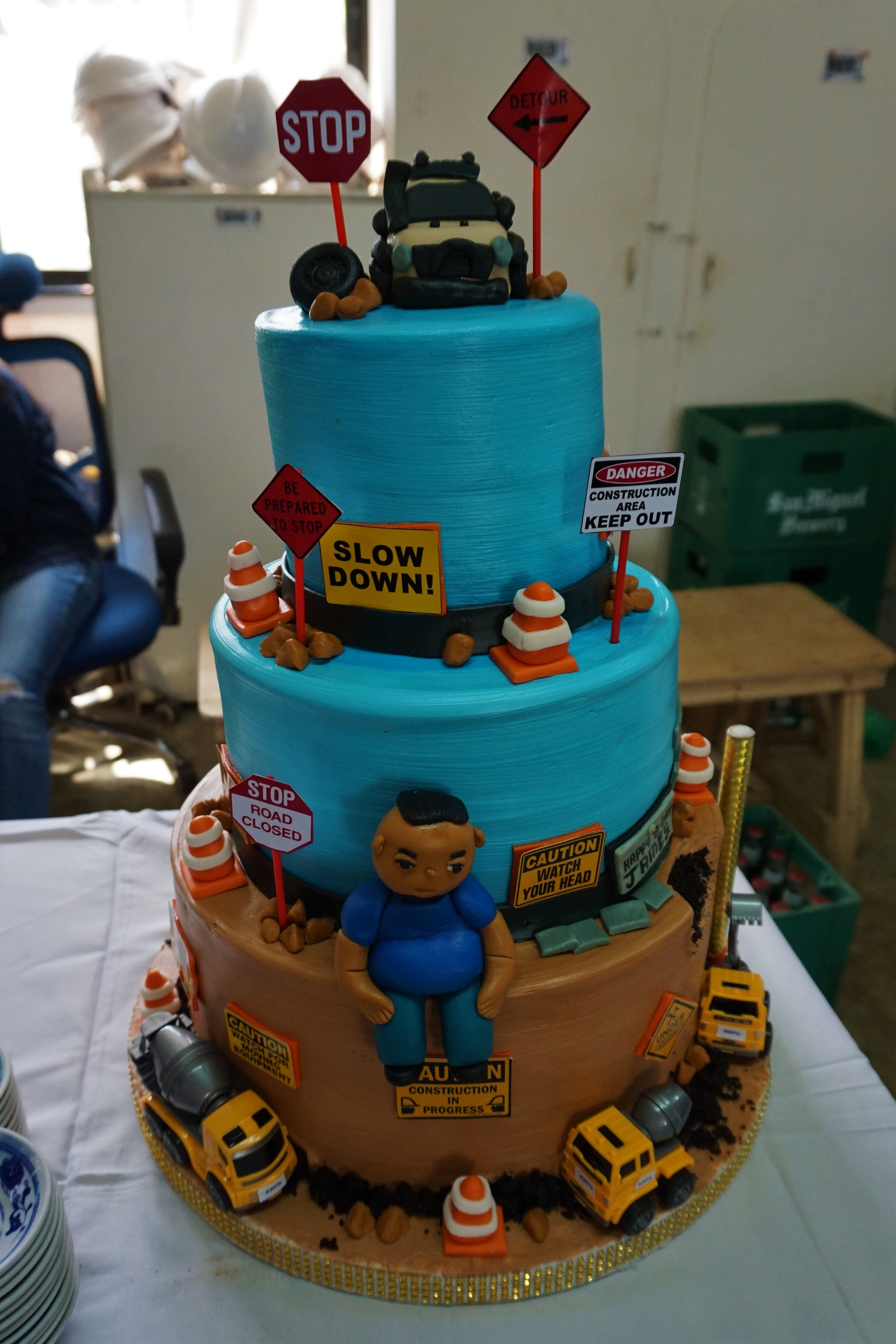
Construction worker themed birthday cake

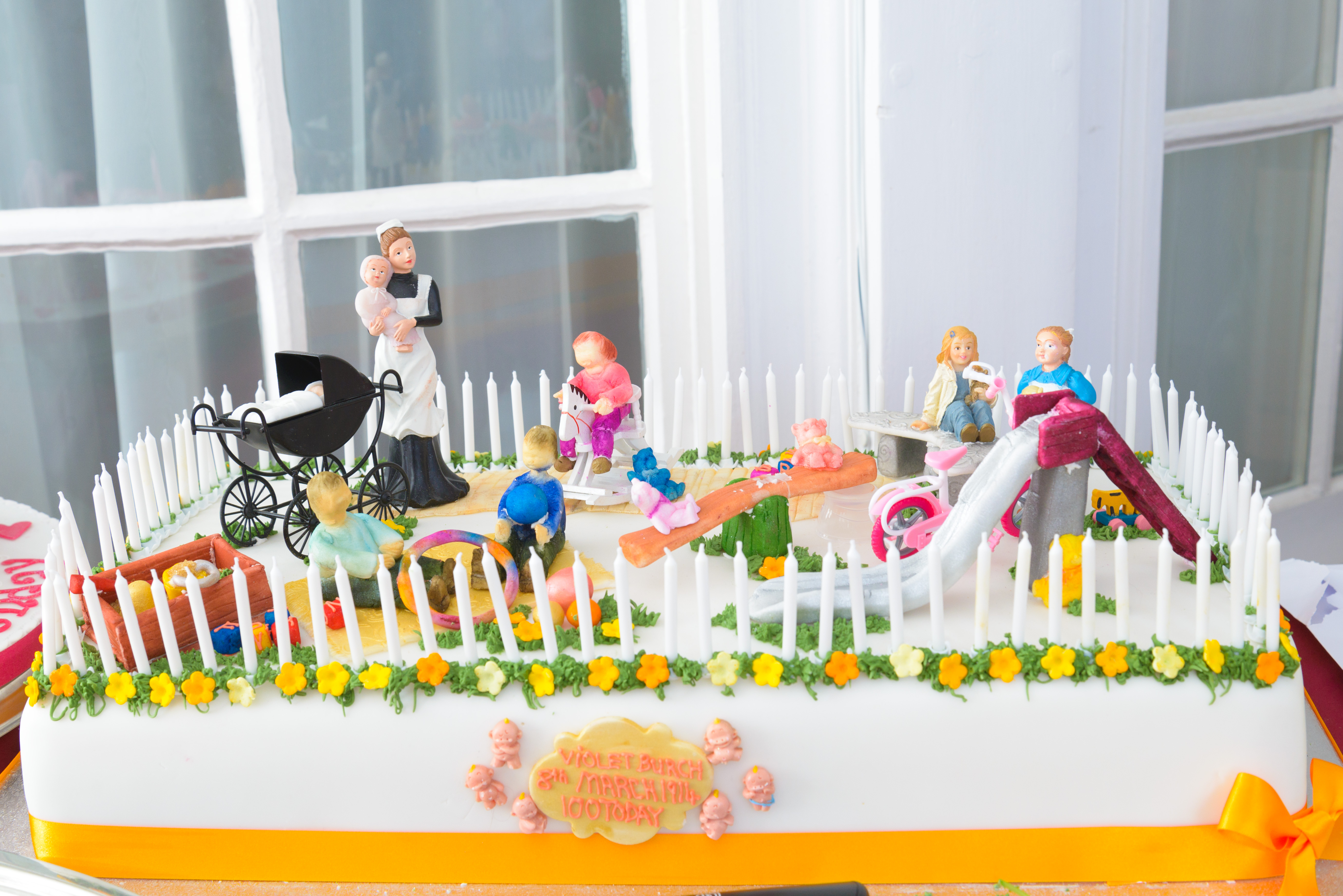
100th birthday cake with 100 candles

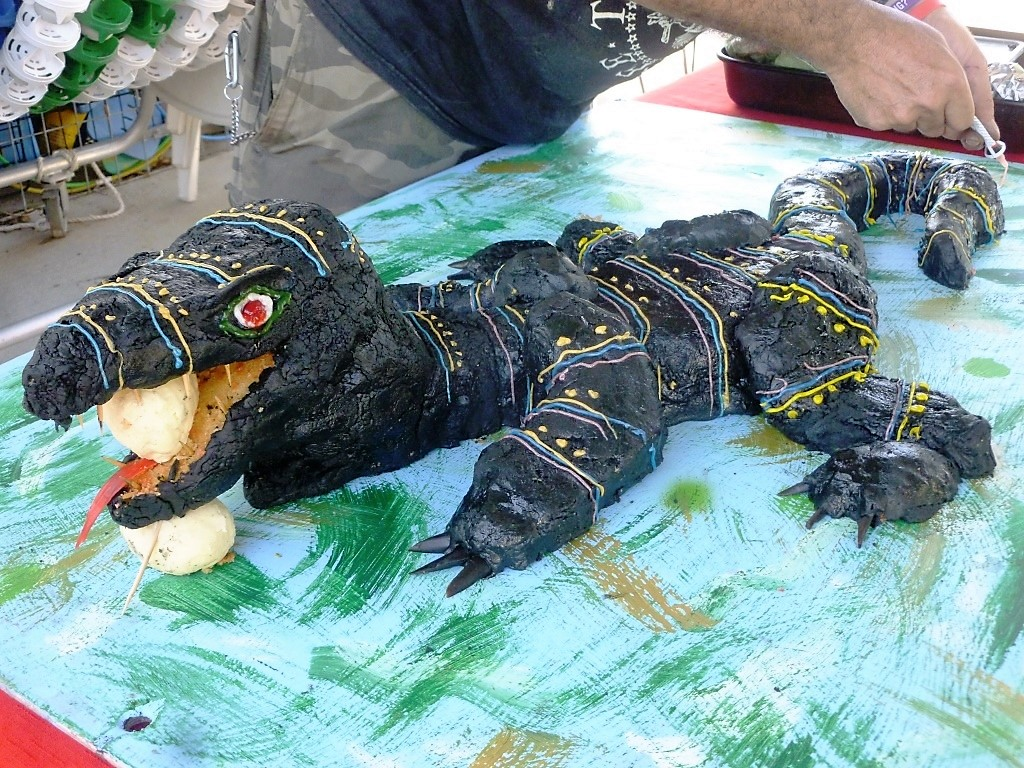
Birthday cake in the shape of a lace monitor

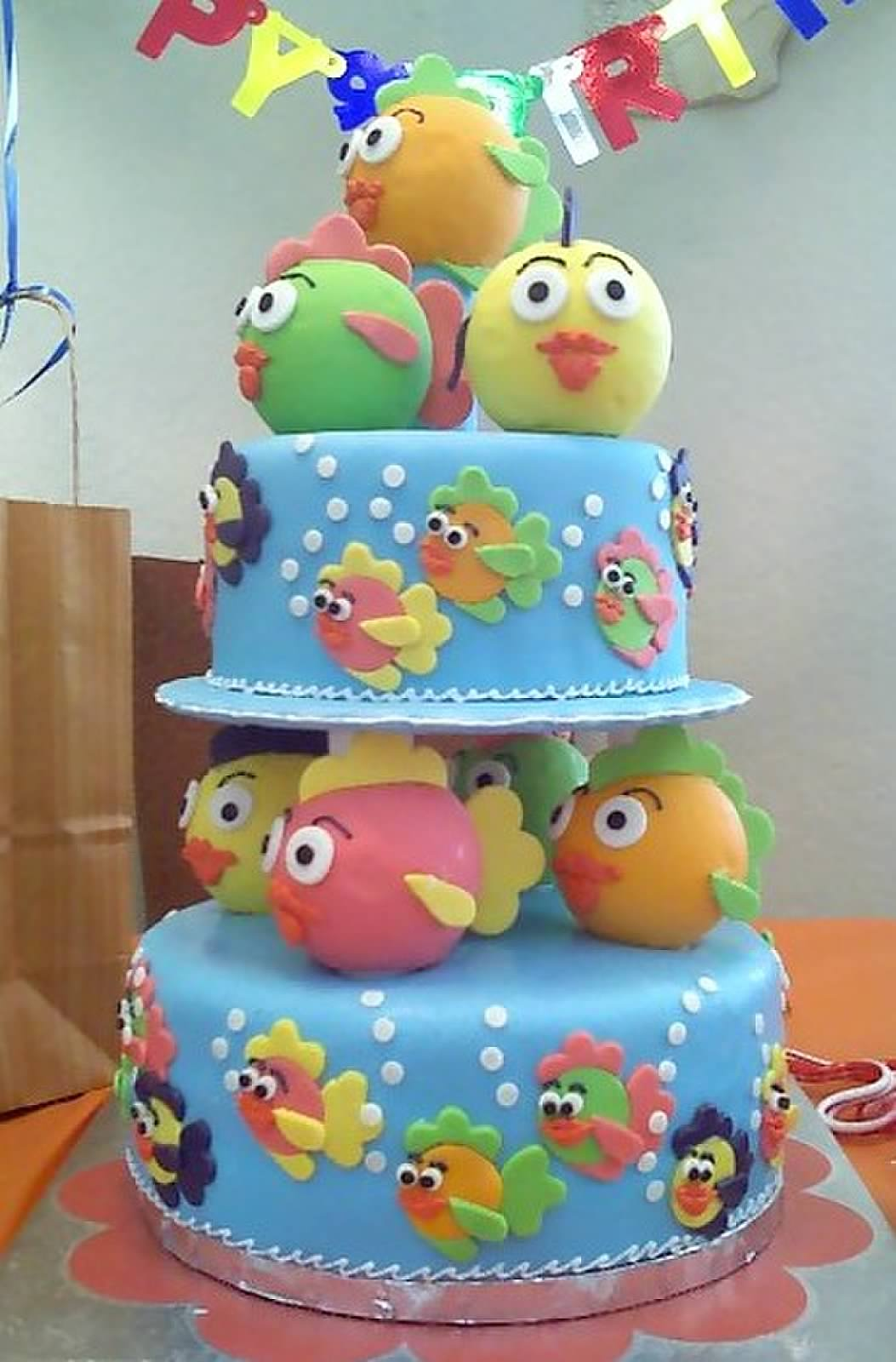
Elaborately layered birthday cake

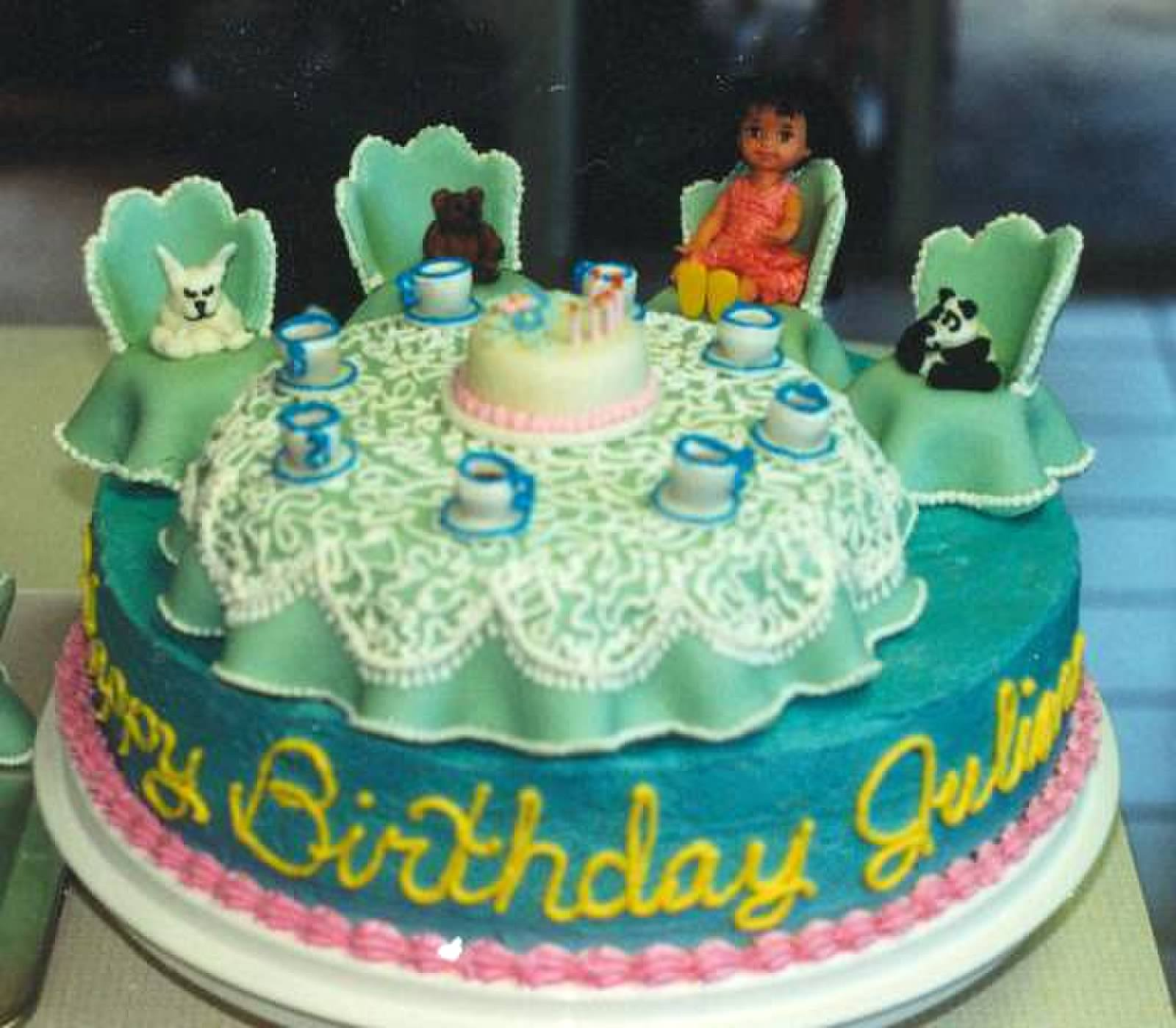
Birthday cake garnished with a birthday party diorama

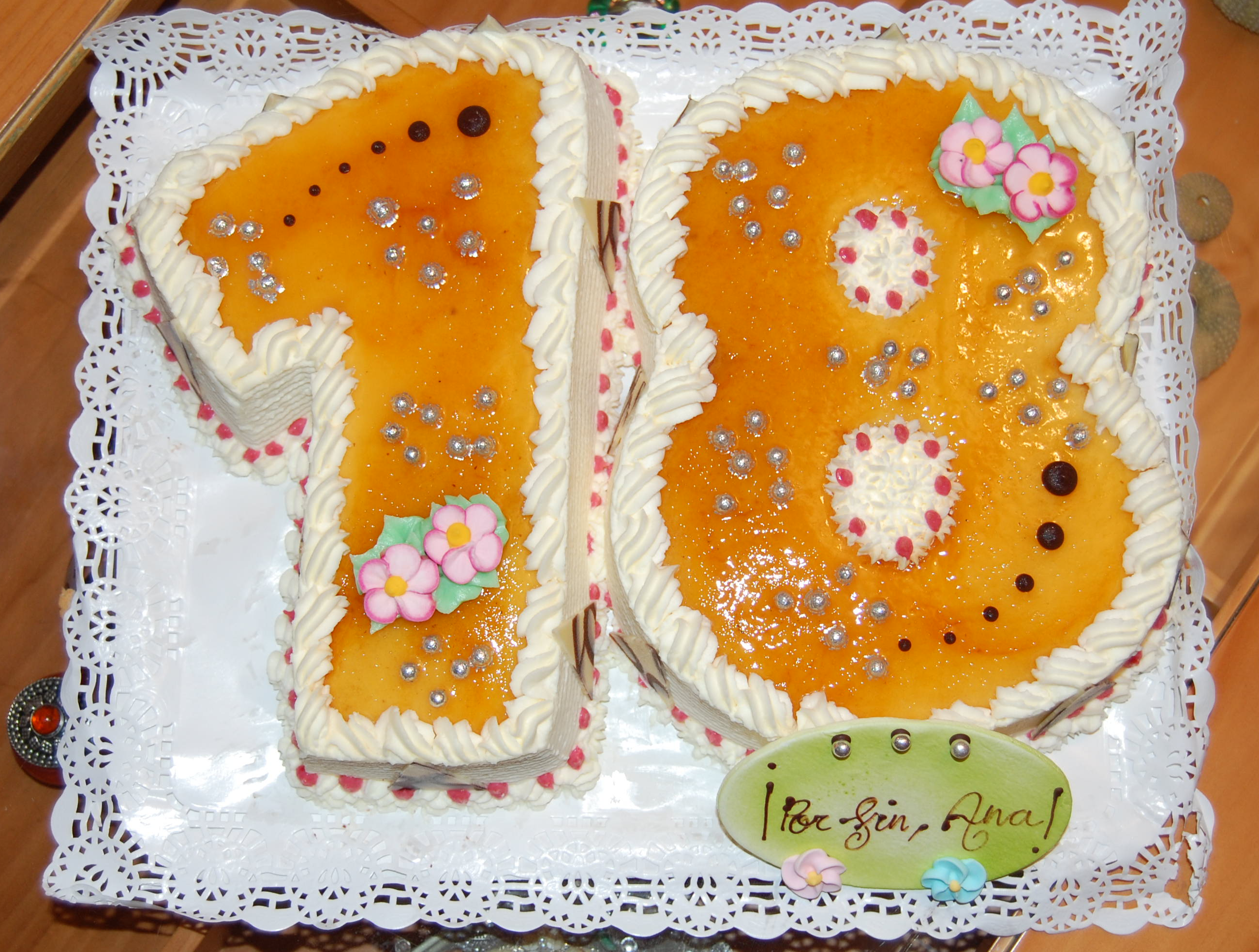
18th birthday cake

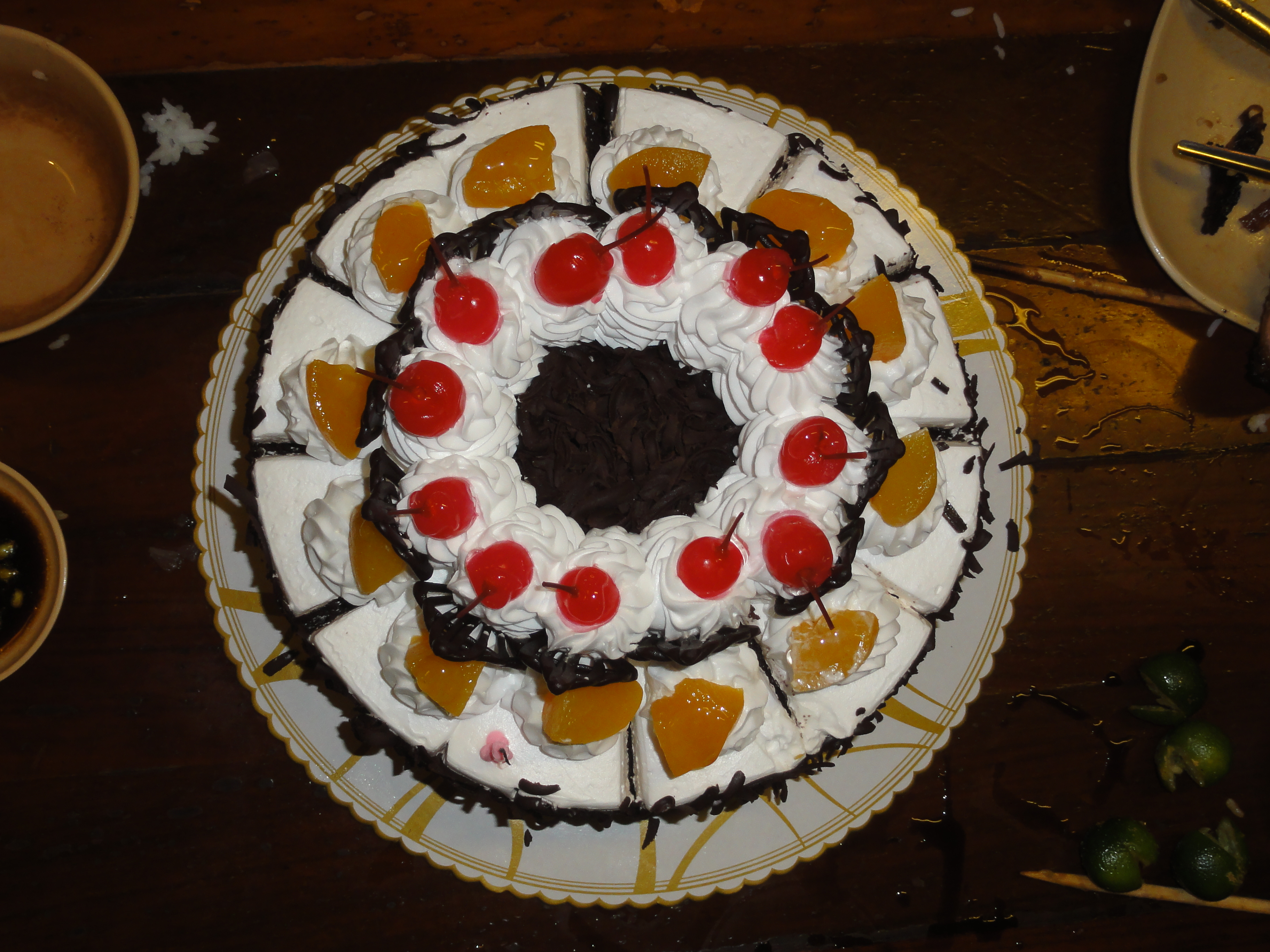
Chocolate with assorted fruit birthday cake

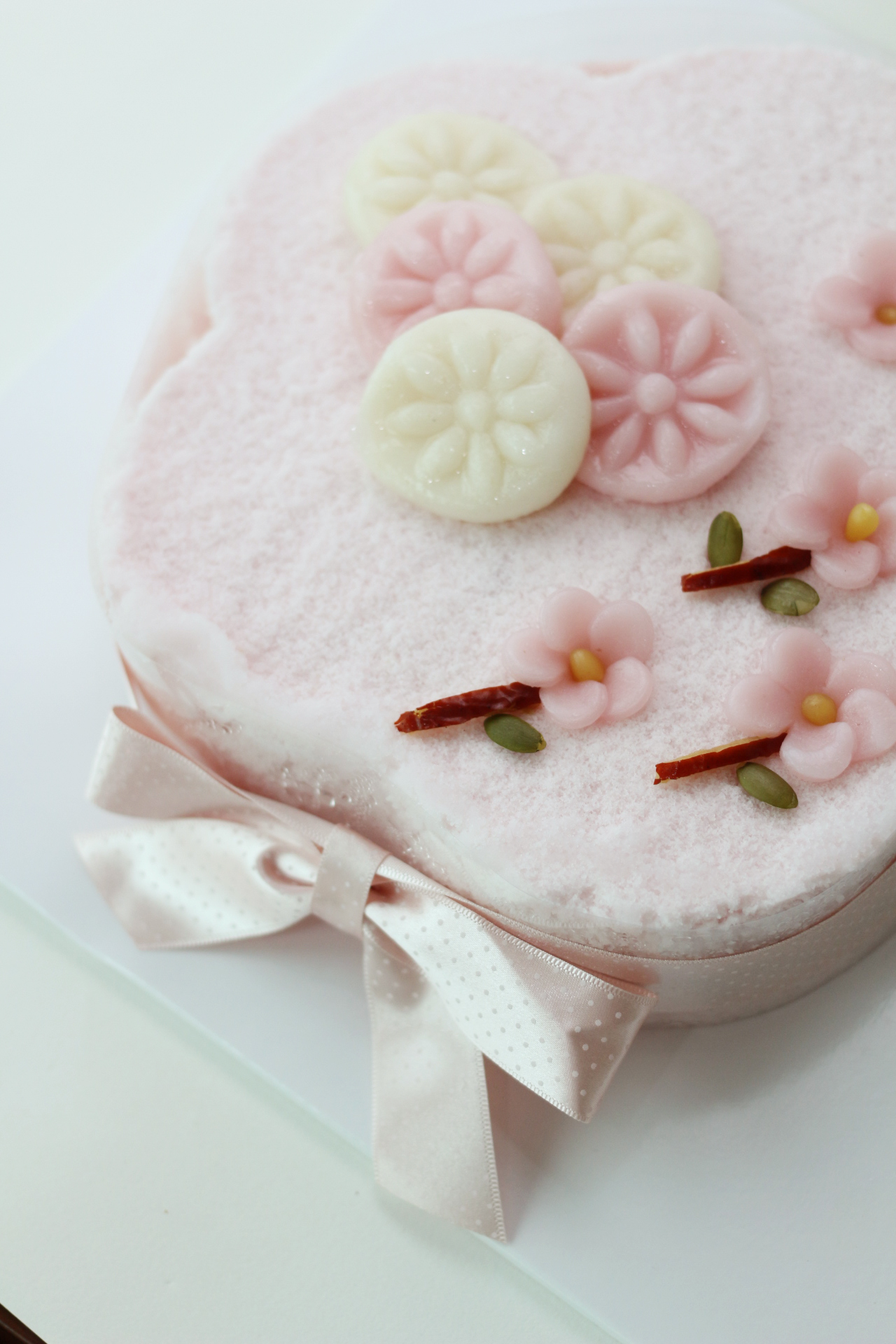
Tteok-cake

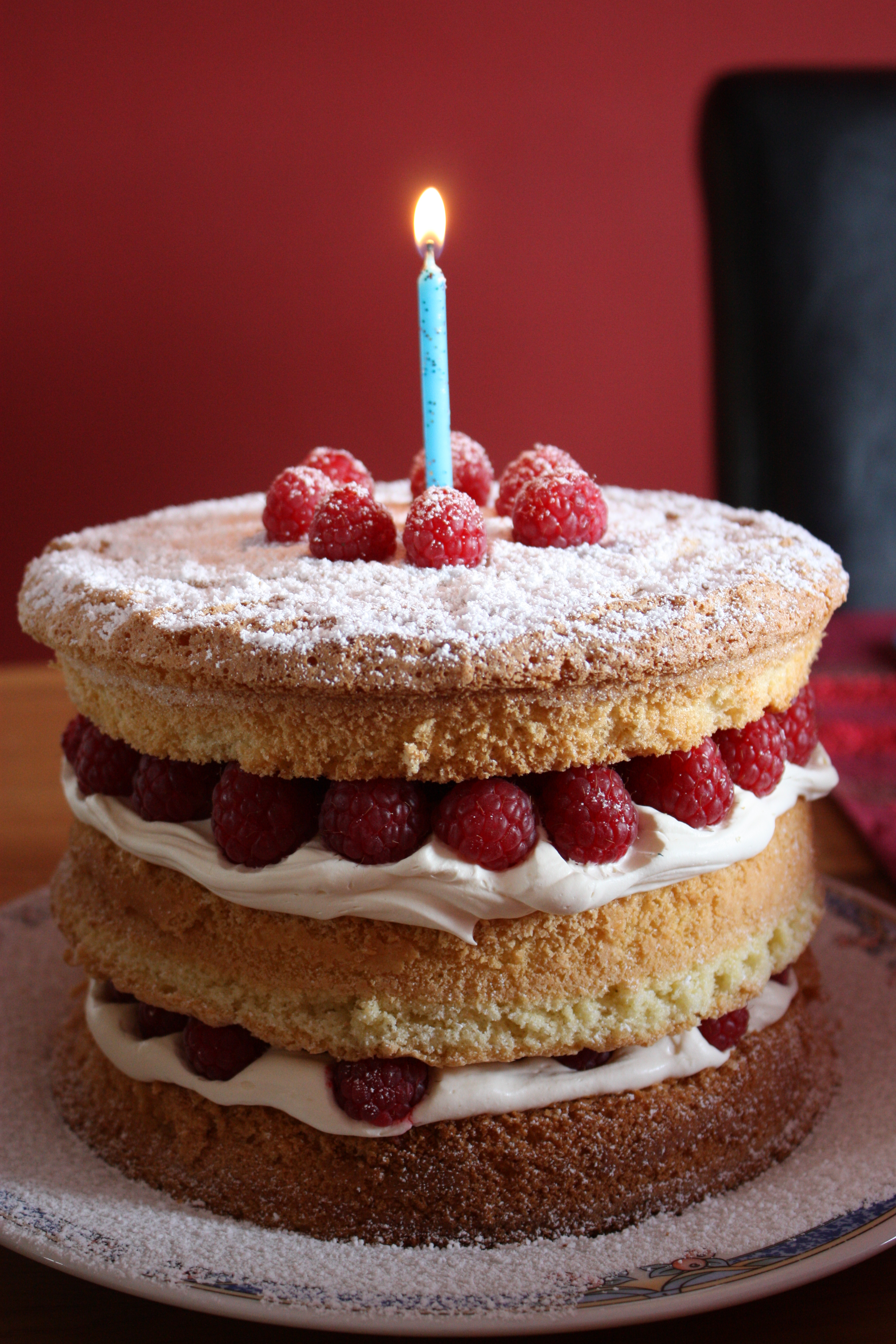
Creamy raspberry birthday cake

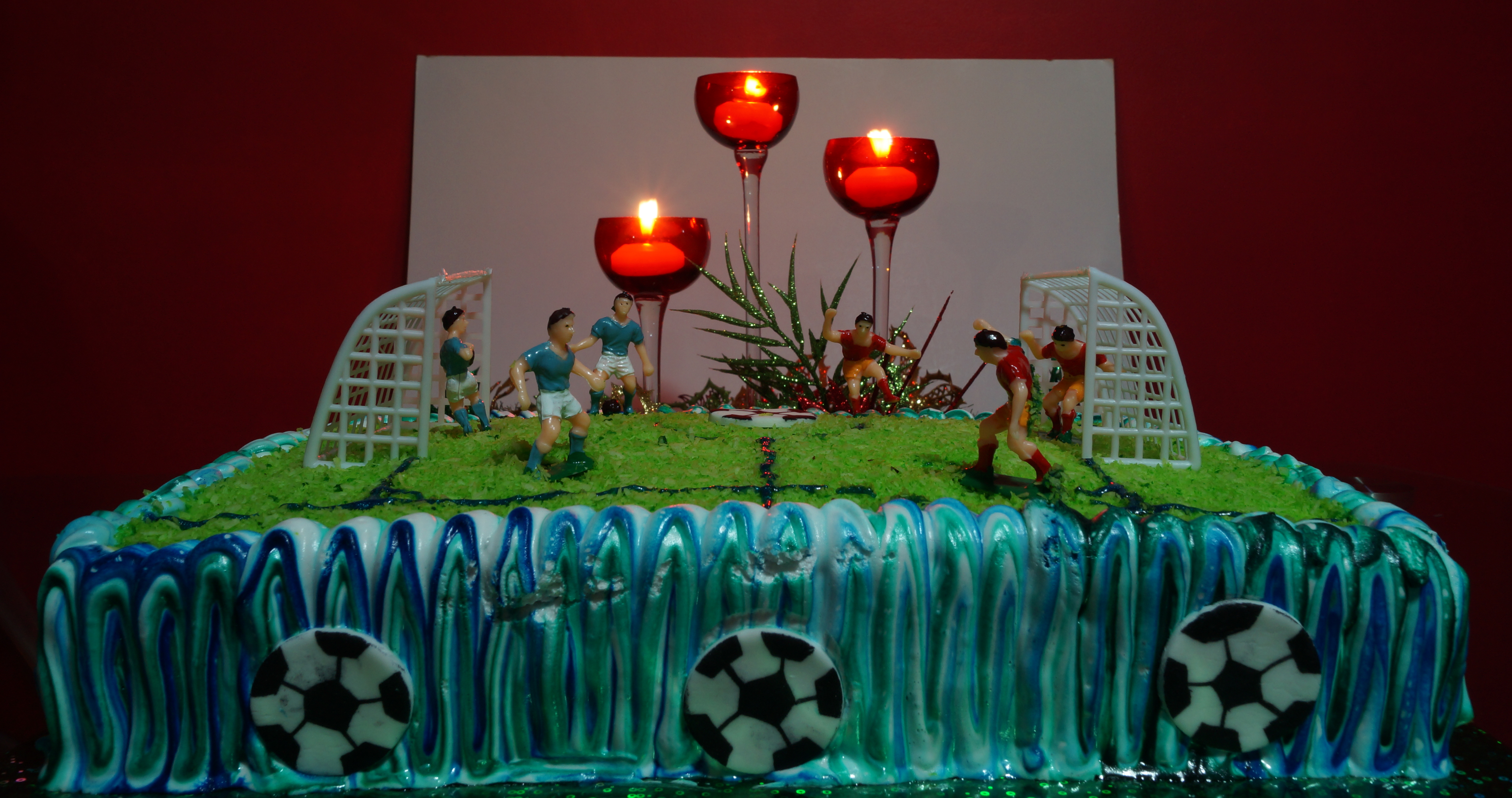
Association football themed birthday cake

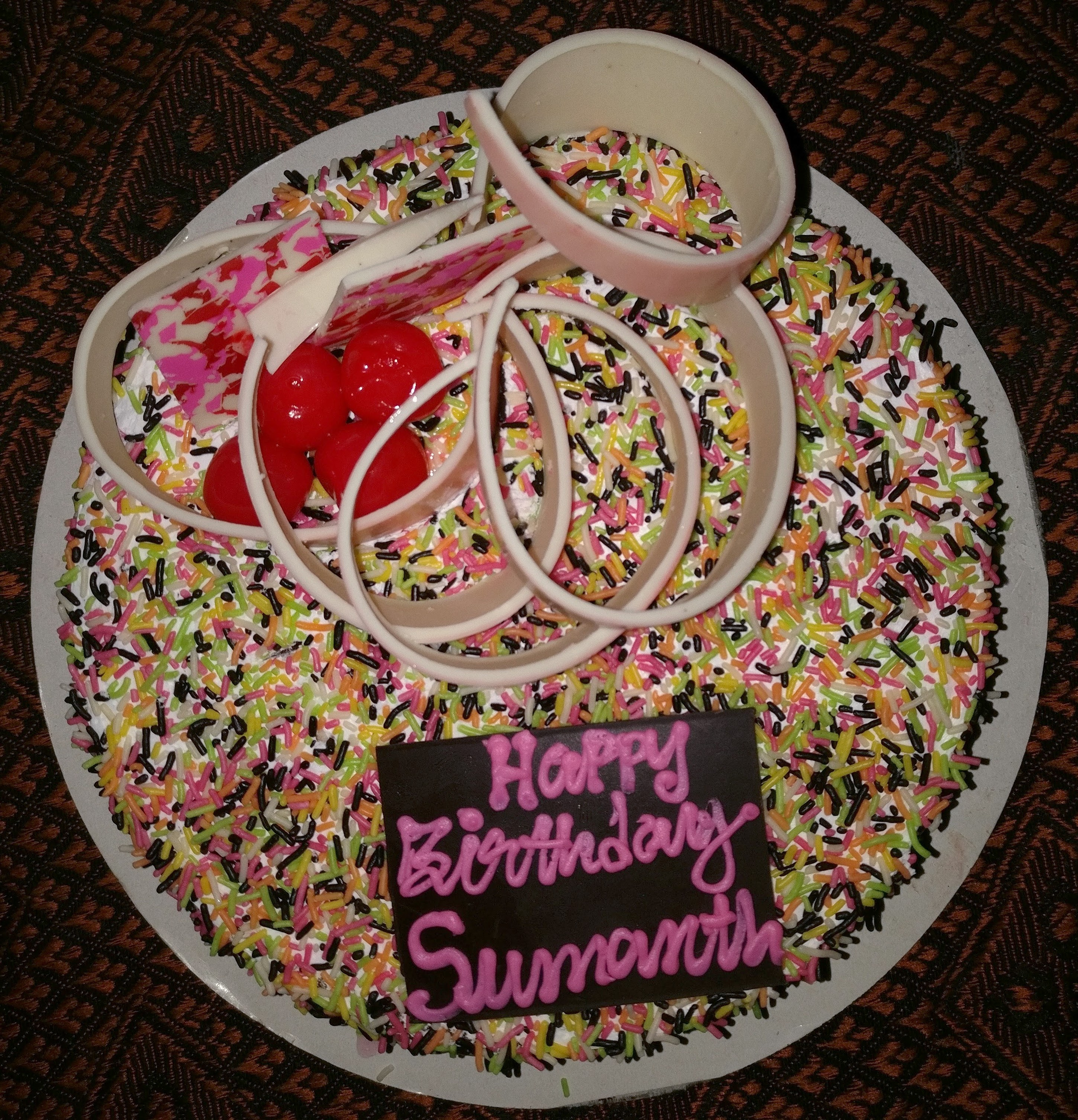
Homemade birthday cake

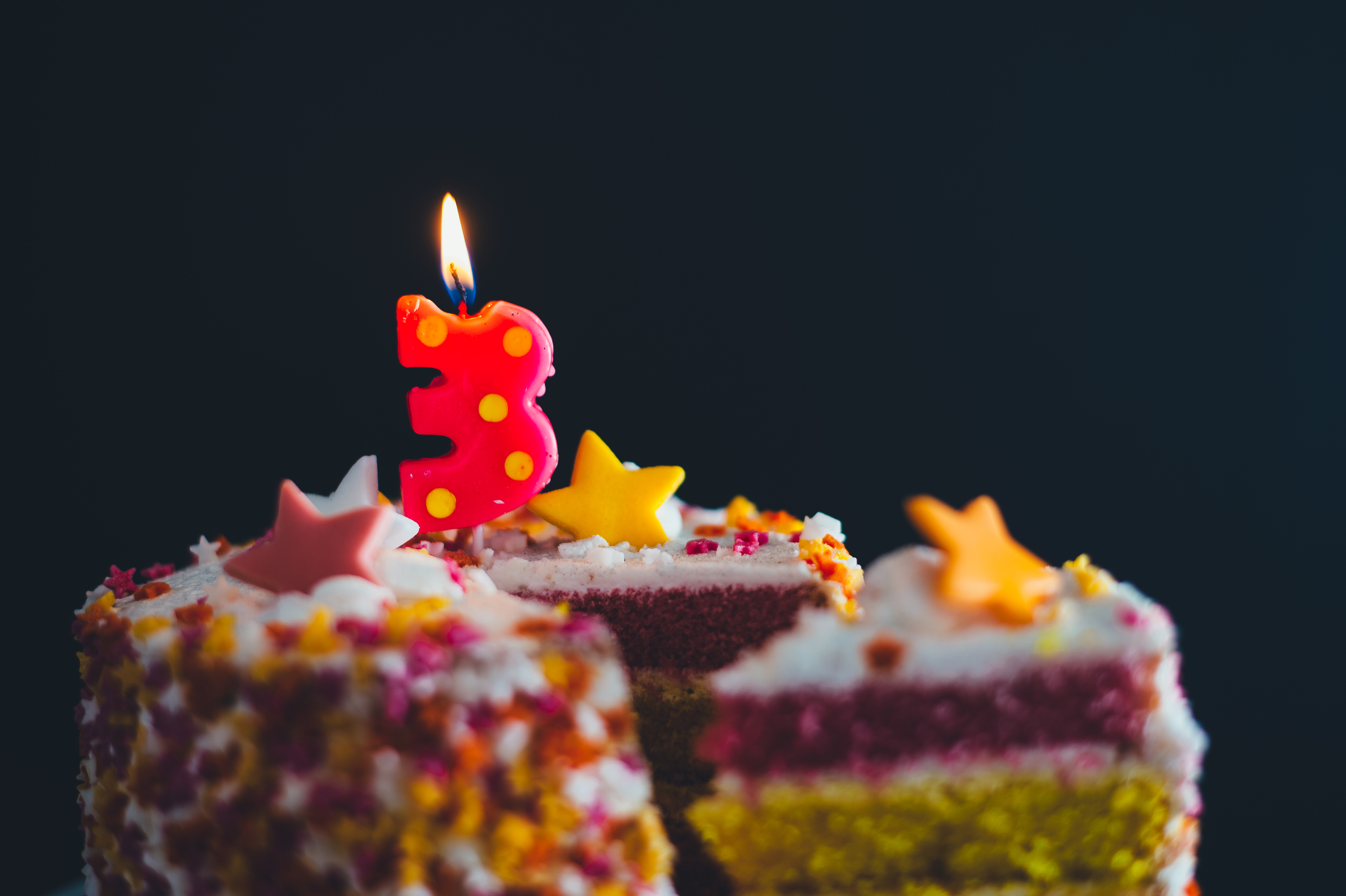
Birthday cake with a "3" shaped candle

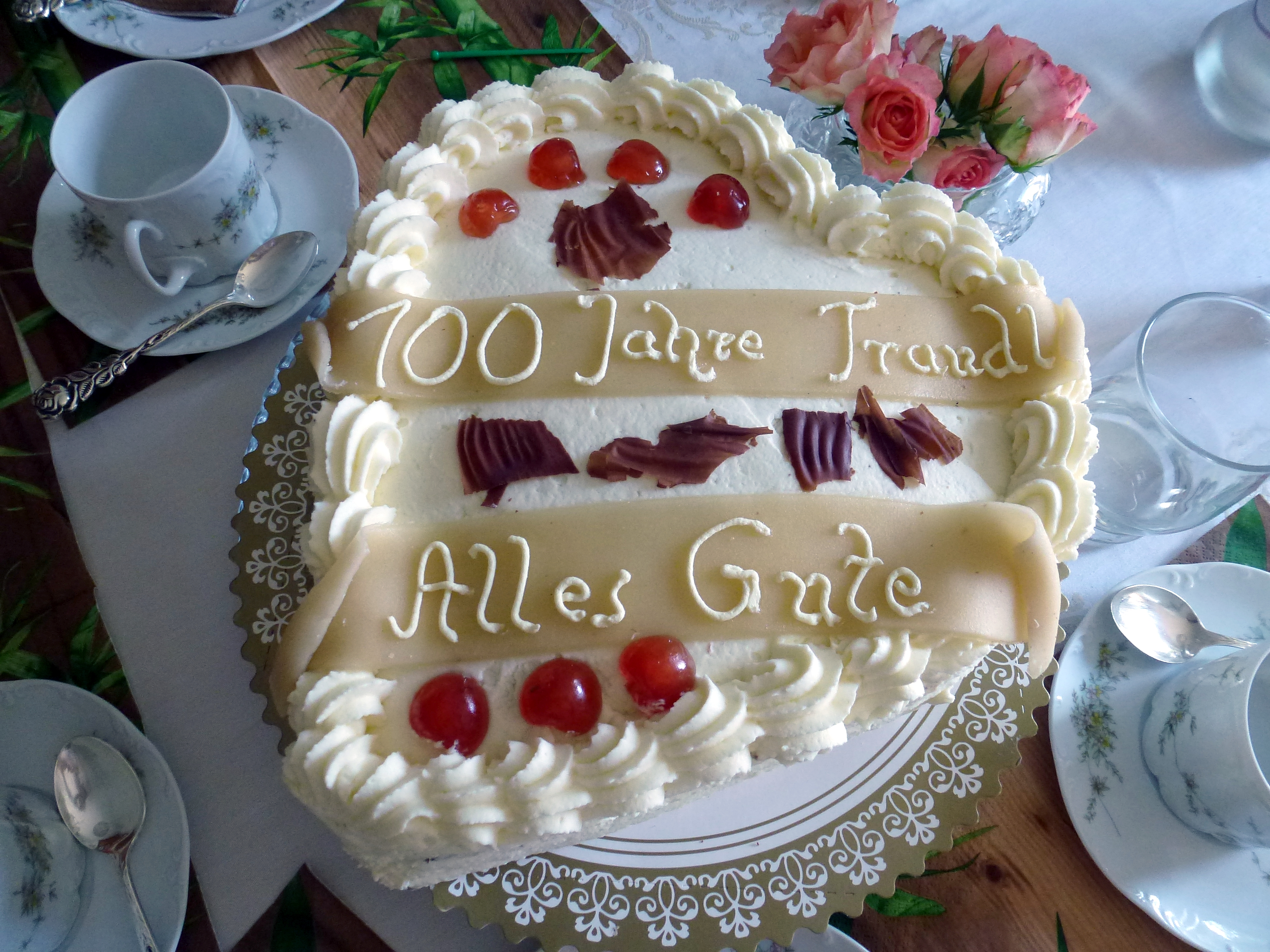
German cake for a 100th birthday

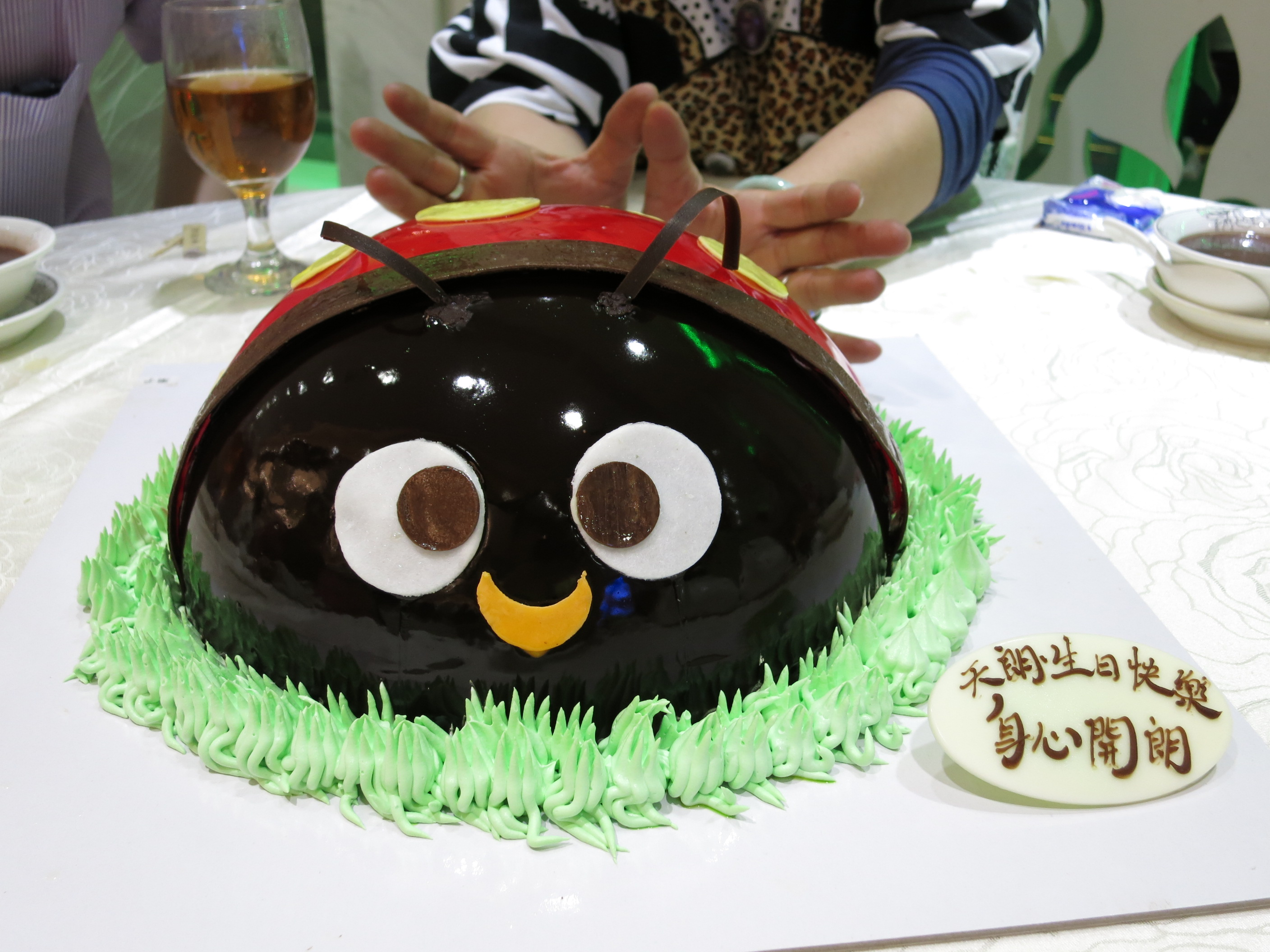
Birthday cake in the shape of a ladybug

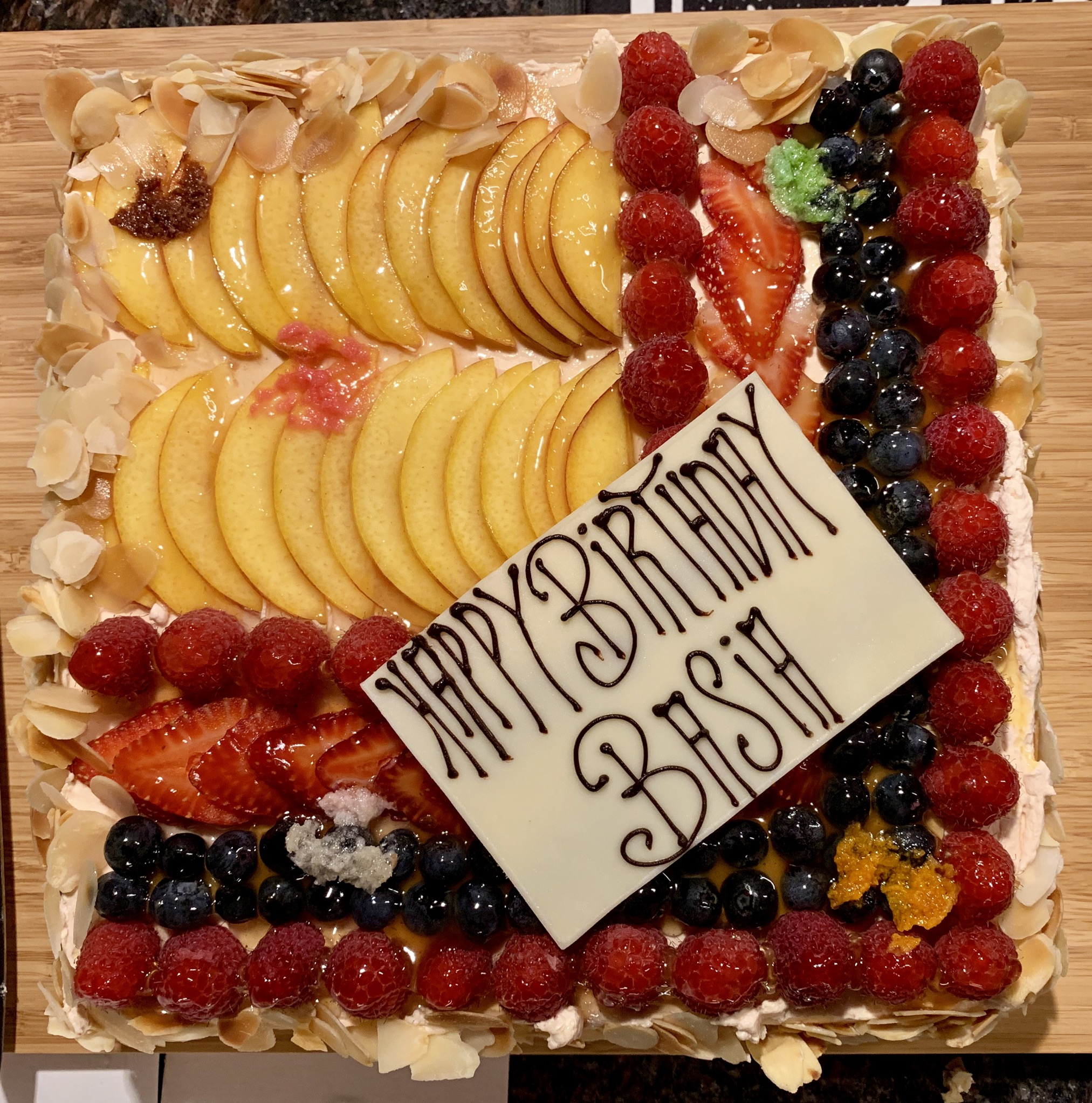
Mixed fruit birthday cake

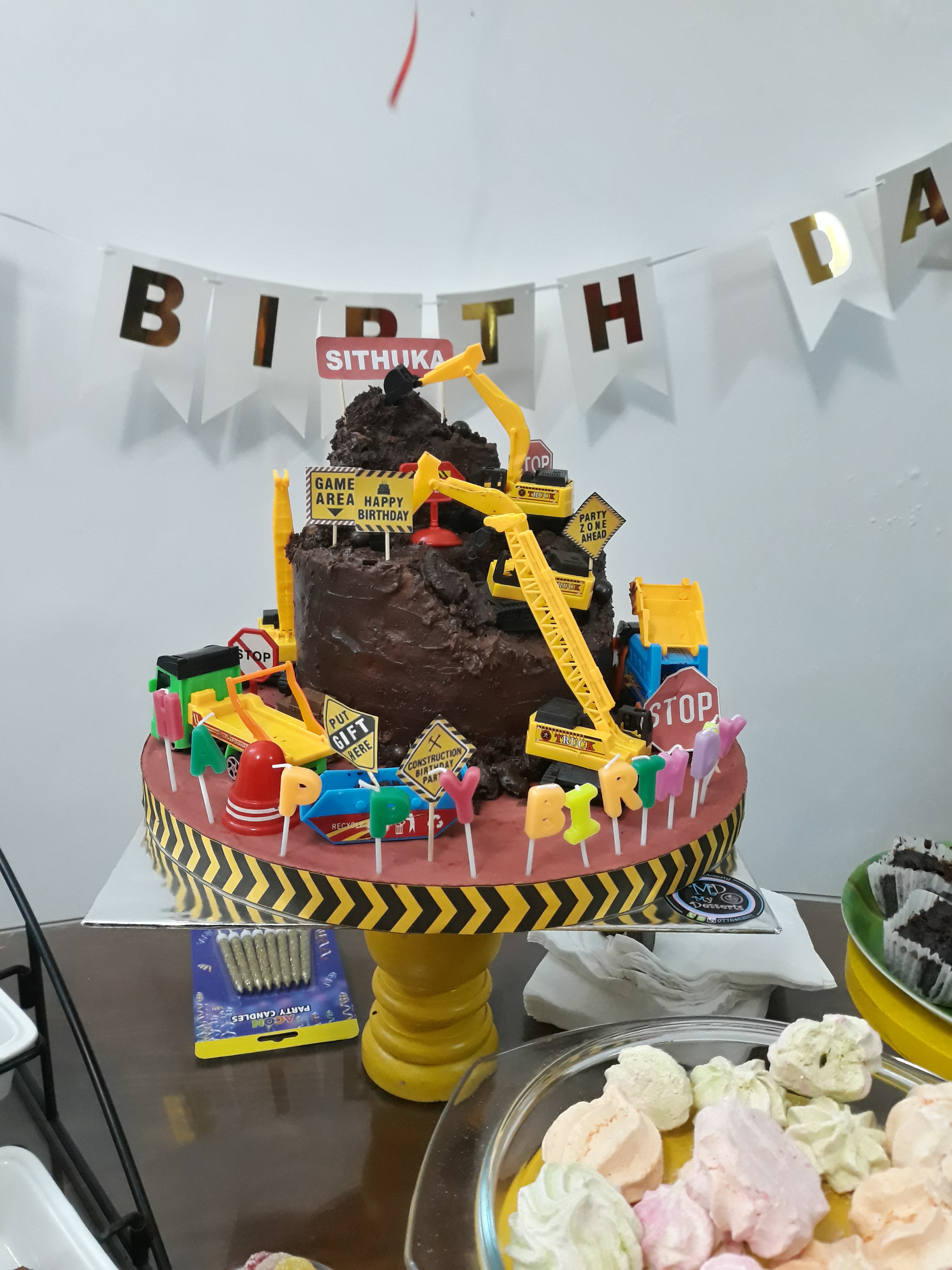
Construction worker themed birthday cake

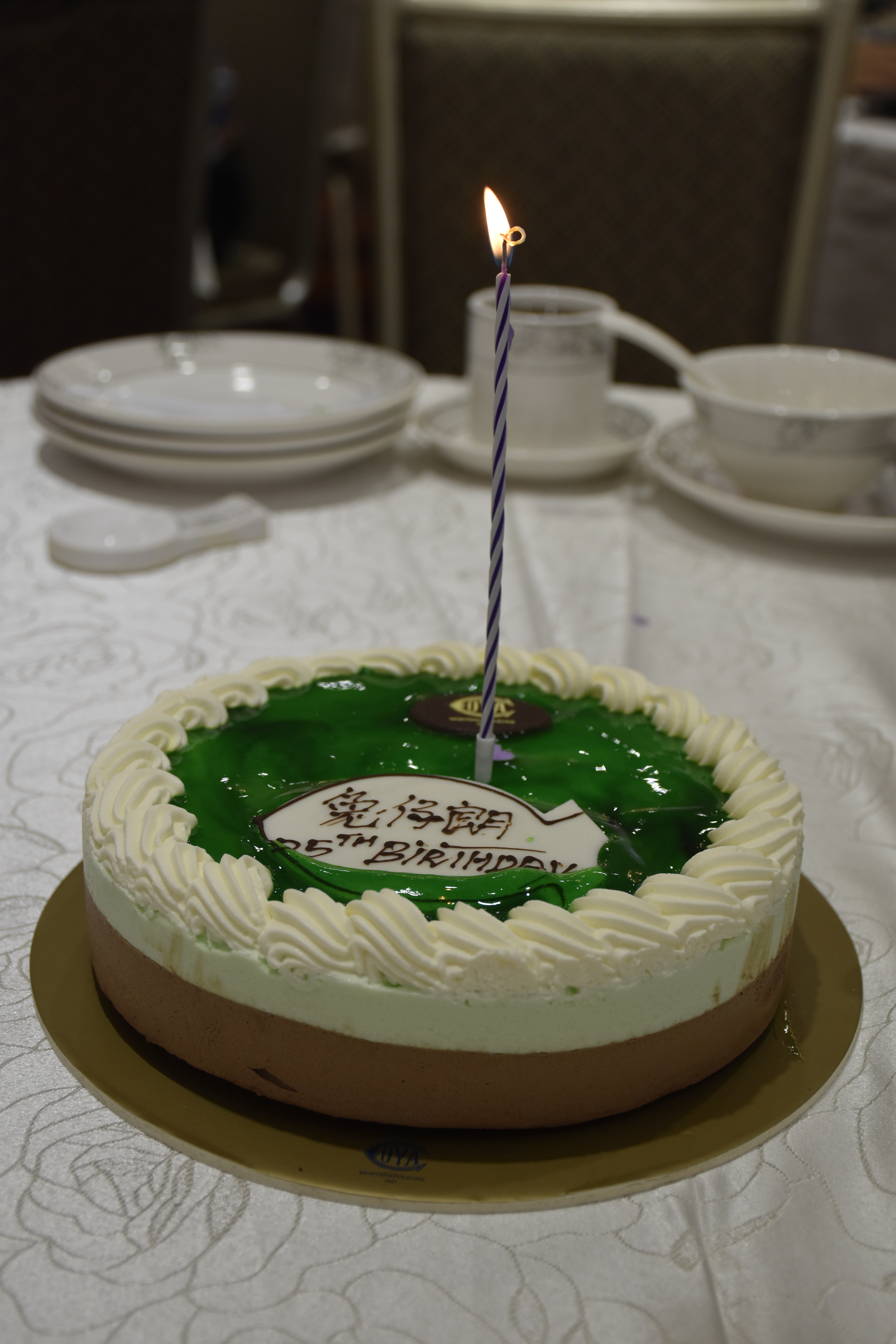
25th birthday mint mousse cake

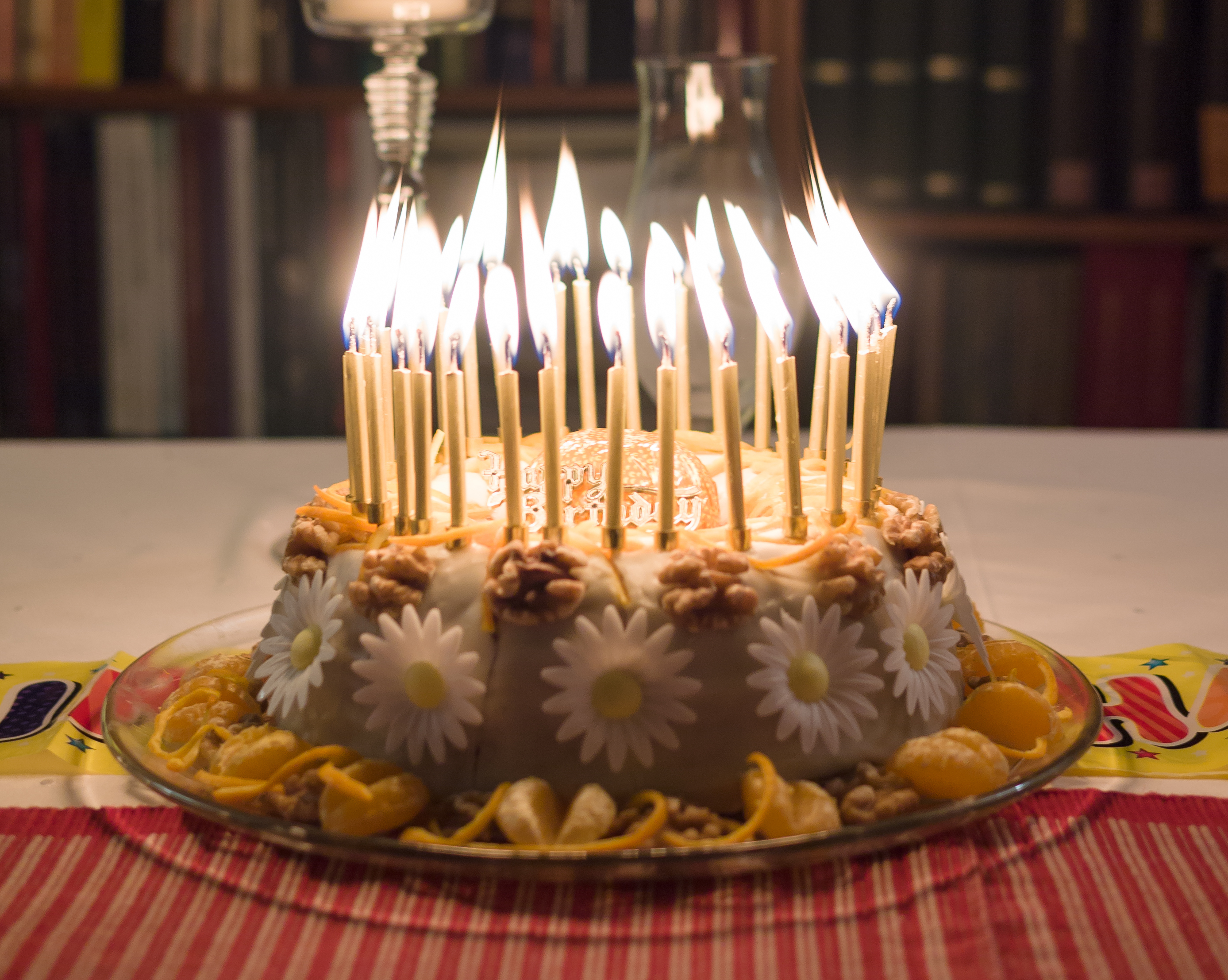
Birthday cake with lit candles

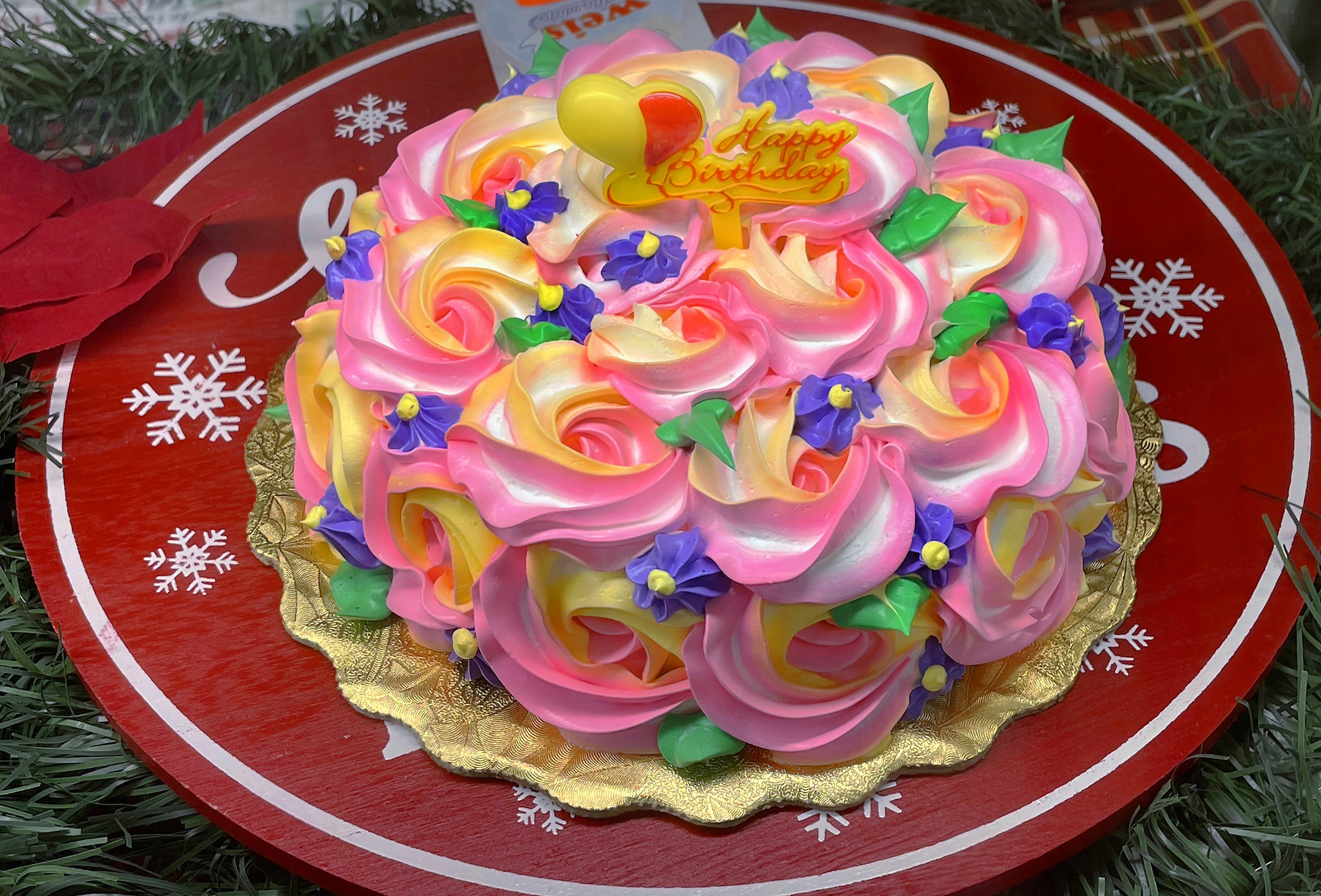
Multicolored Birthday Cake

== See also ==
- Wedding cake
- List of desserts
- Birthday
- Rite of passage
- Birthday cake flavor
