= List of Portuguese dishes =

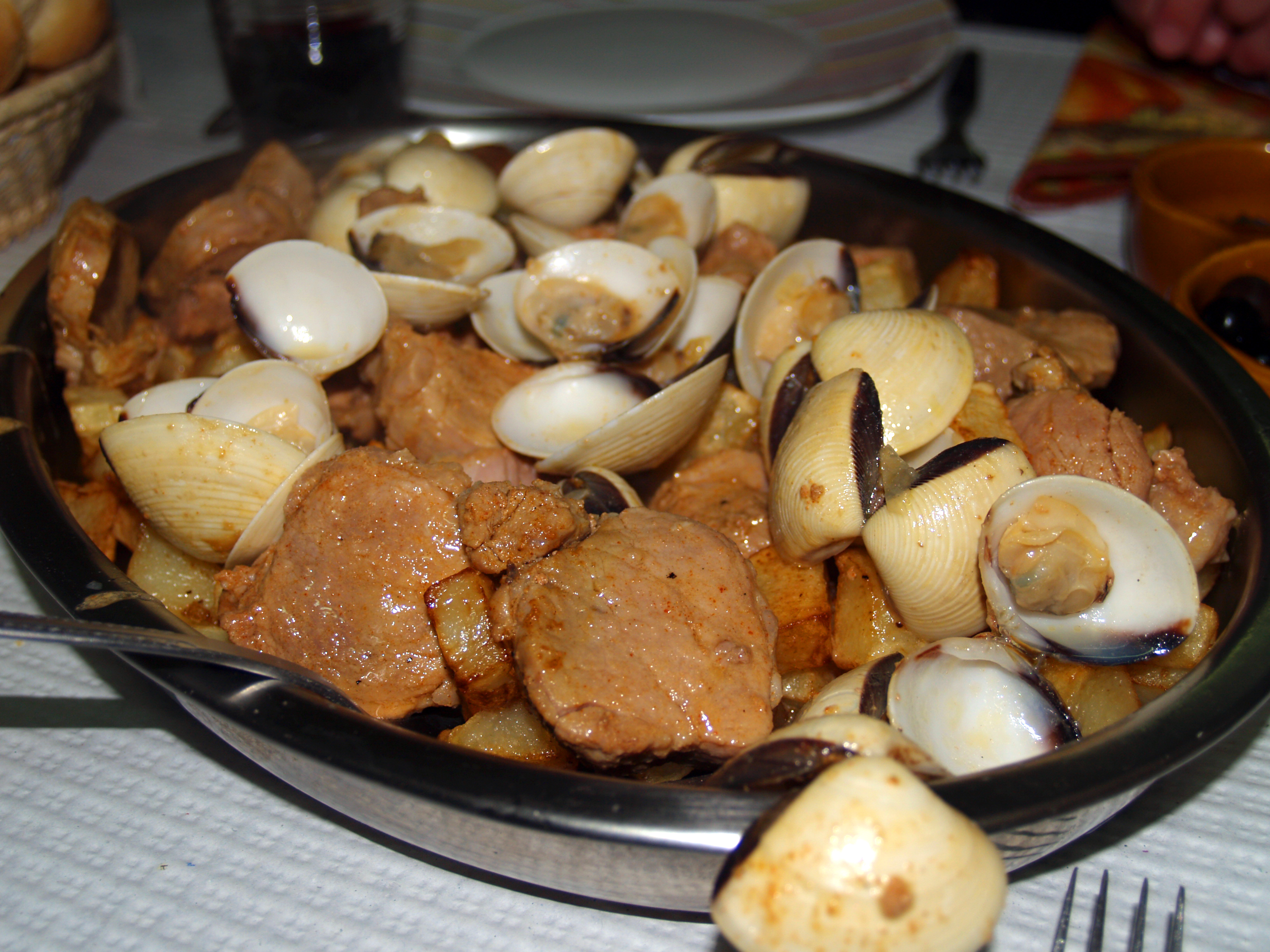
Carne de porco à alentejana is one of the most traditional and popular pork dishes of Portuguese cuisine

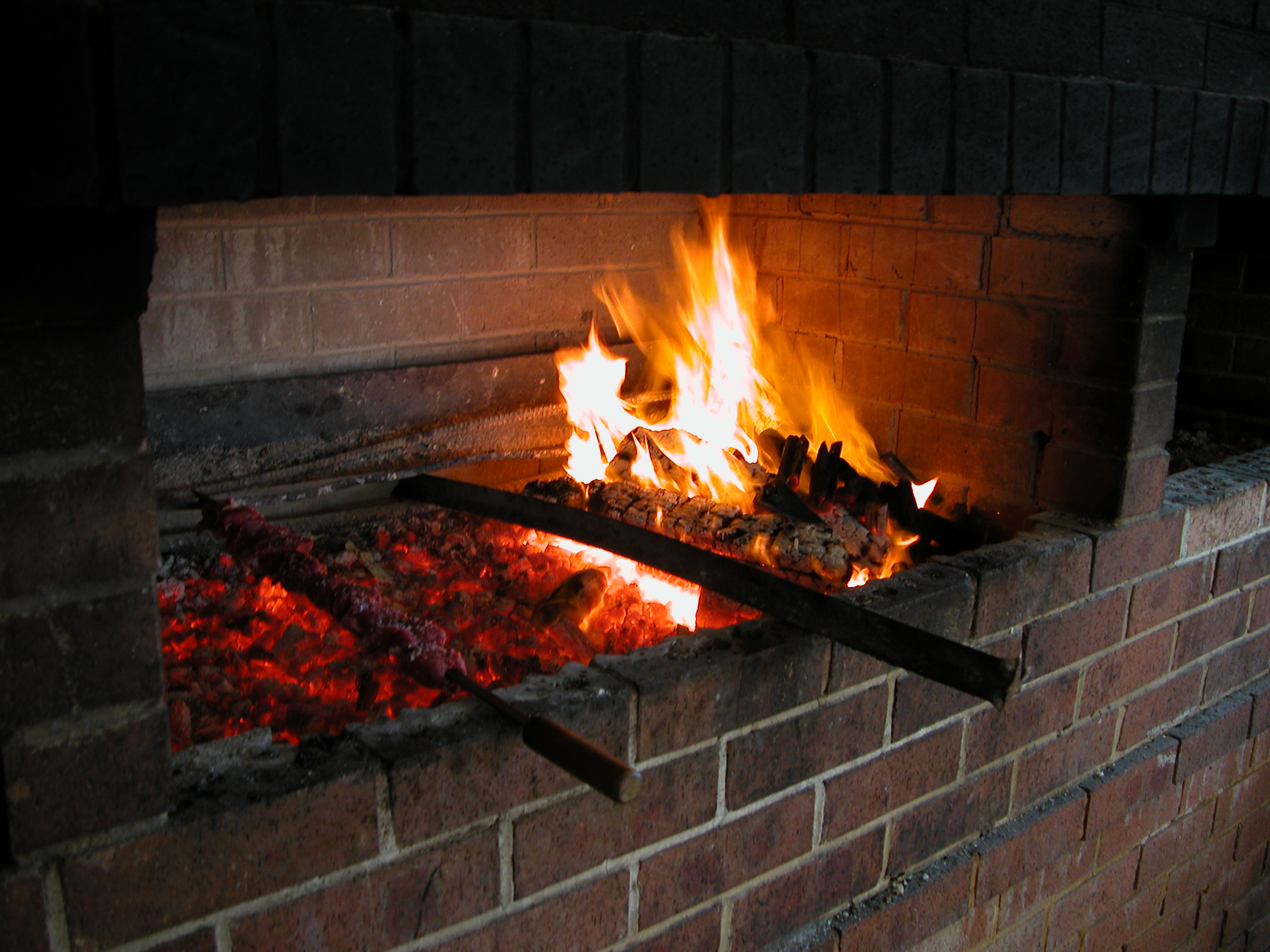
Espetada, a Portuguese beef dish, being grilled

This is a list of Portuguese dishes and foods. Despite being relatively restricted to an Atlantic sustenance, Portuguese cuisine has many Mediterranean influences. Portuguese cuisine is famous for seafood. The influence of Portugal's former colonial possessions is also notable, especially in the wide variety of spices used. These spices include piri piri (small, fiery chili peppers), black pepper and white pepper, as well as cinnamon, vanilla, clove, cumin, allspice and saffron. Olive oil is one of the bases of Portuguese cuisine, which is used both for cooking and flavouring meals. Garlic is widely used, as are herbs, such as bay leaf, coriander, oregano, thyme, rosemary and parsley, being the most prevalent. Portuguese beverages are also included in this list.

== Portuguese dishes ==
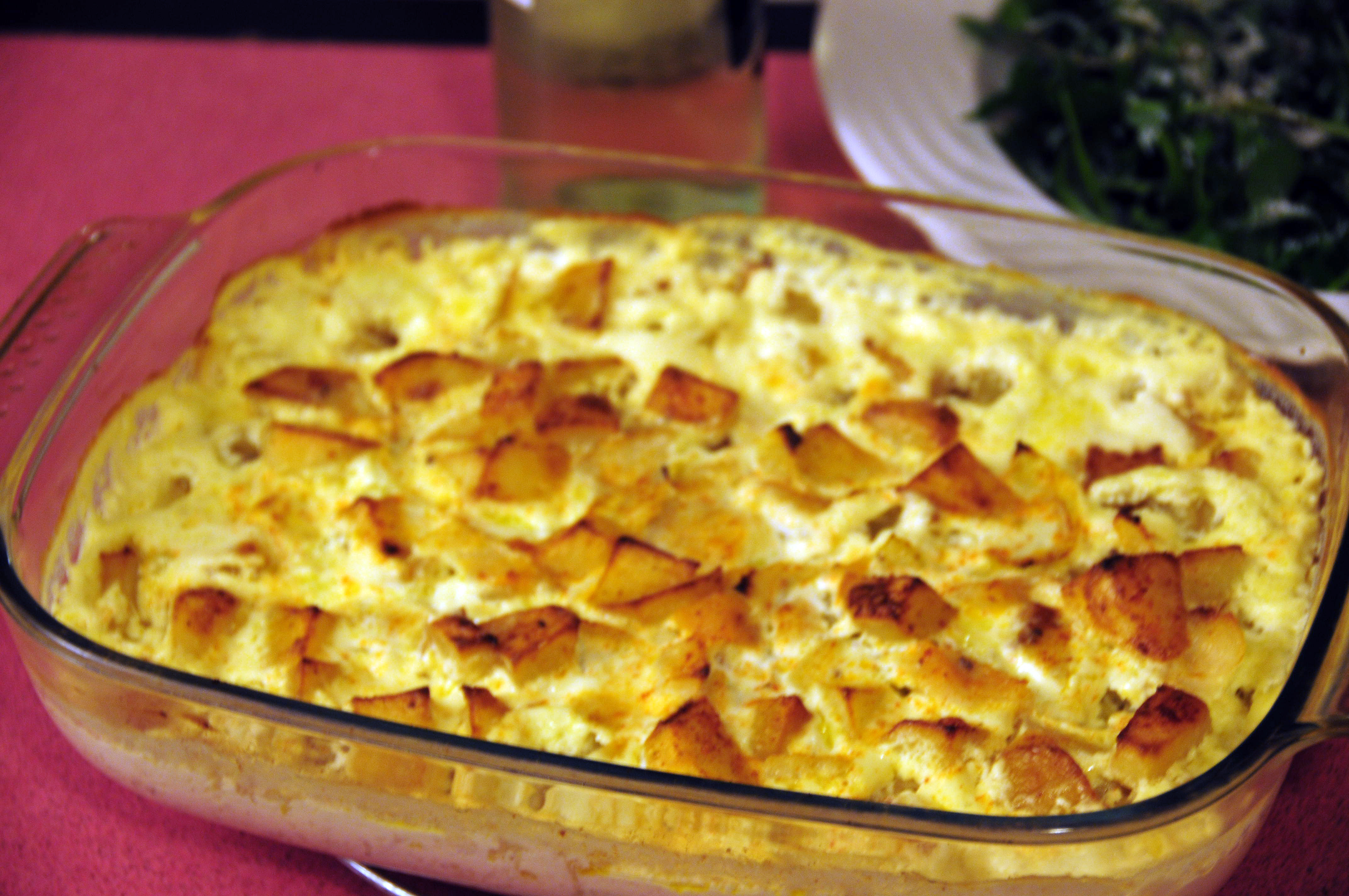
Bacalhau com natas

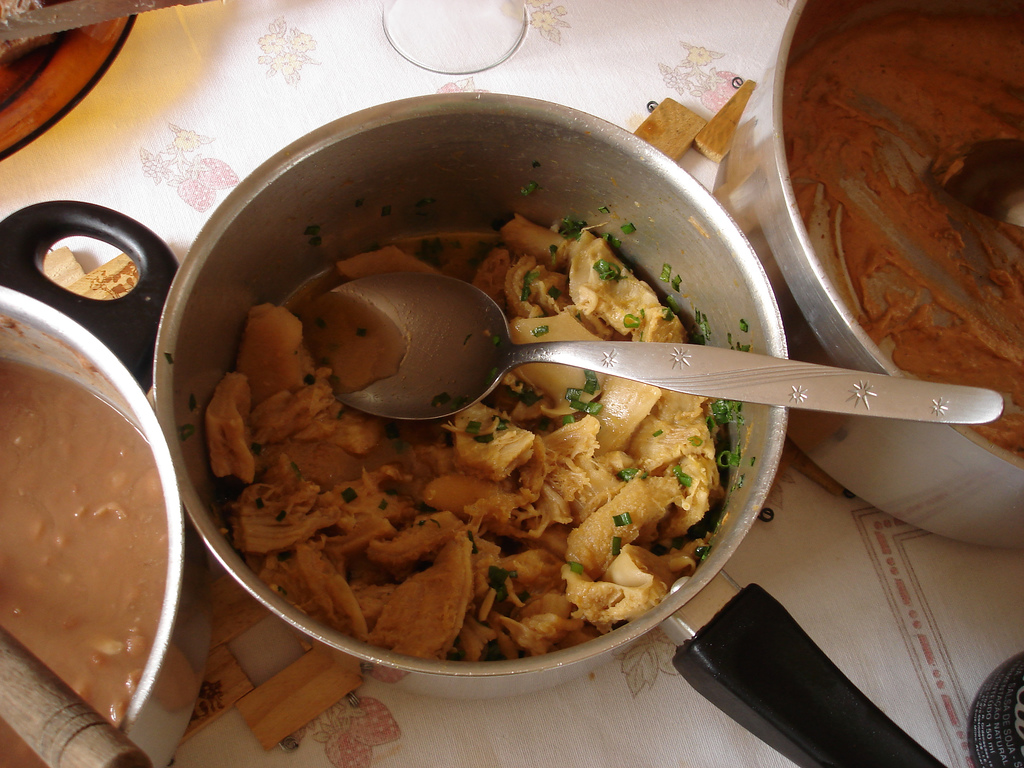
Dobradinha

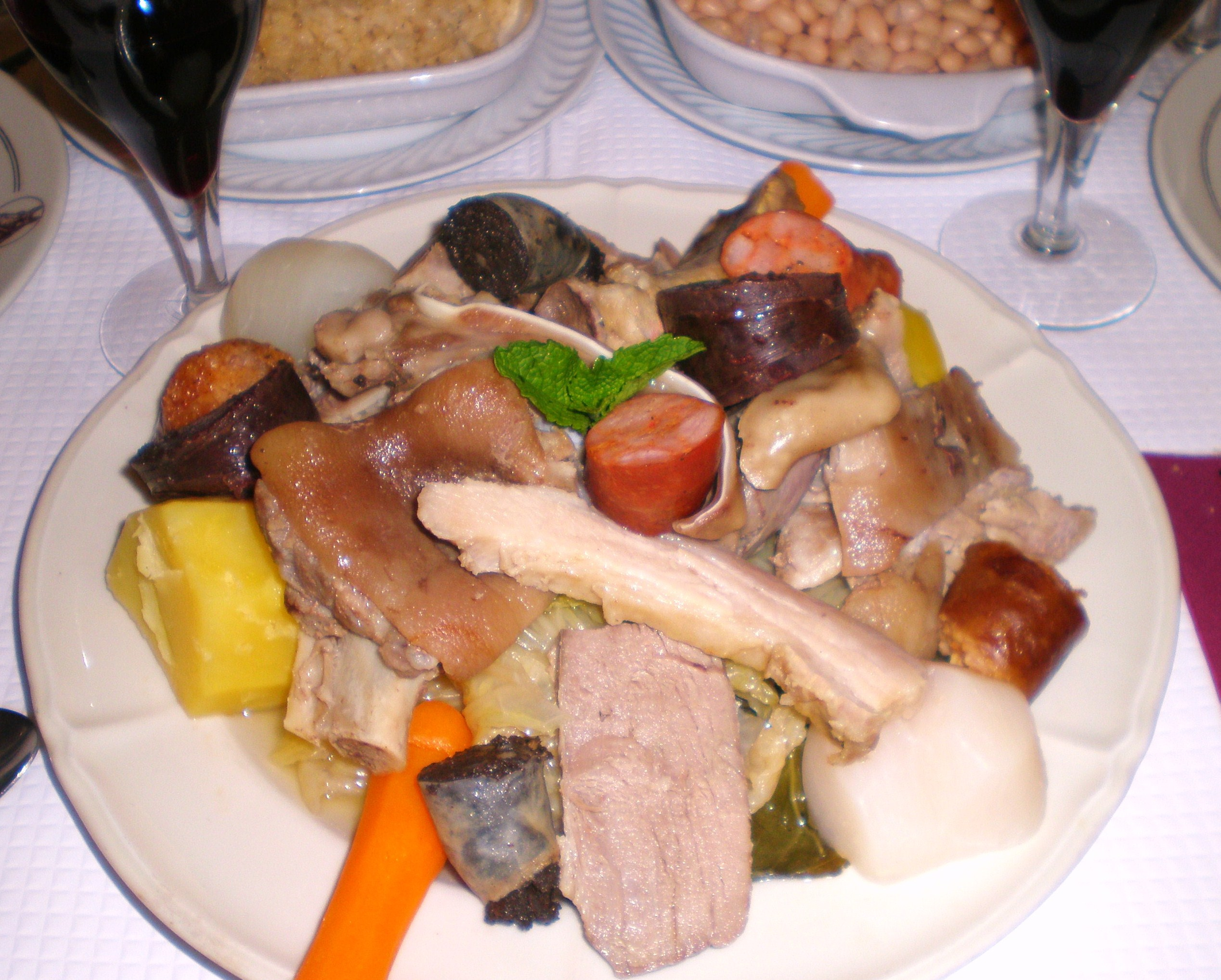
Portuguese stew - Cozido à Portuguesa

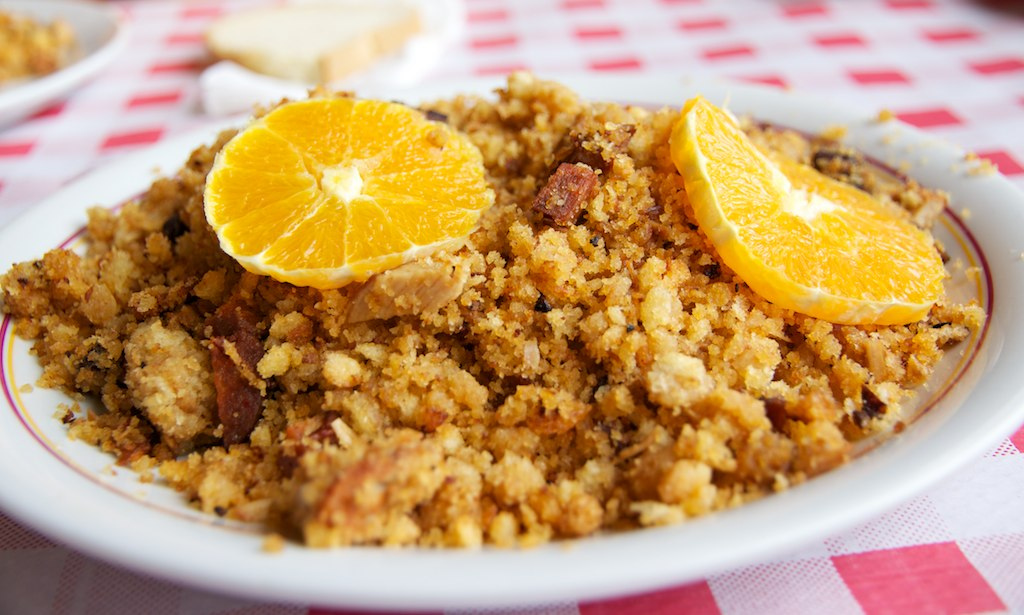
Migas

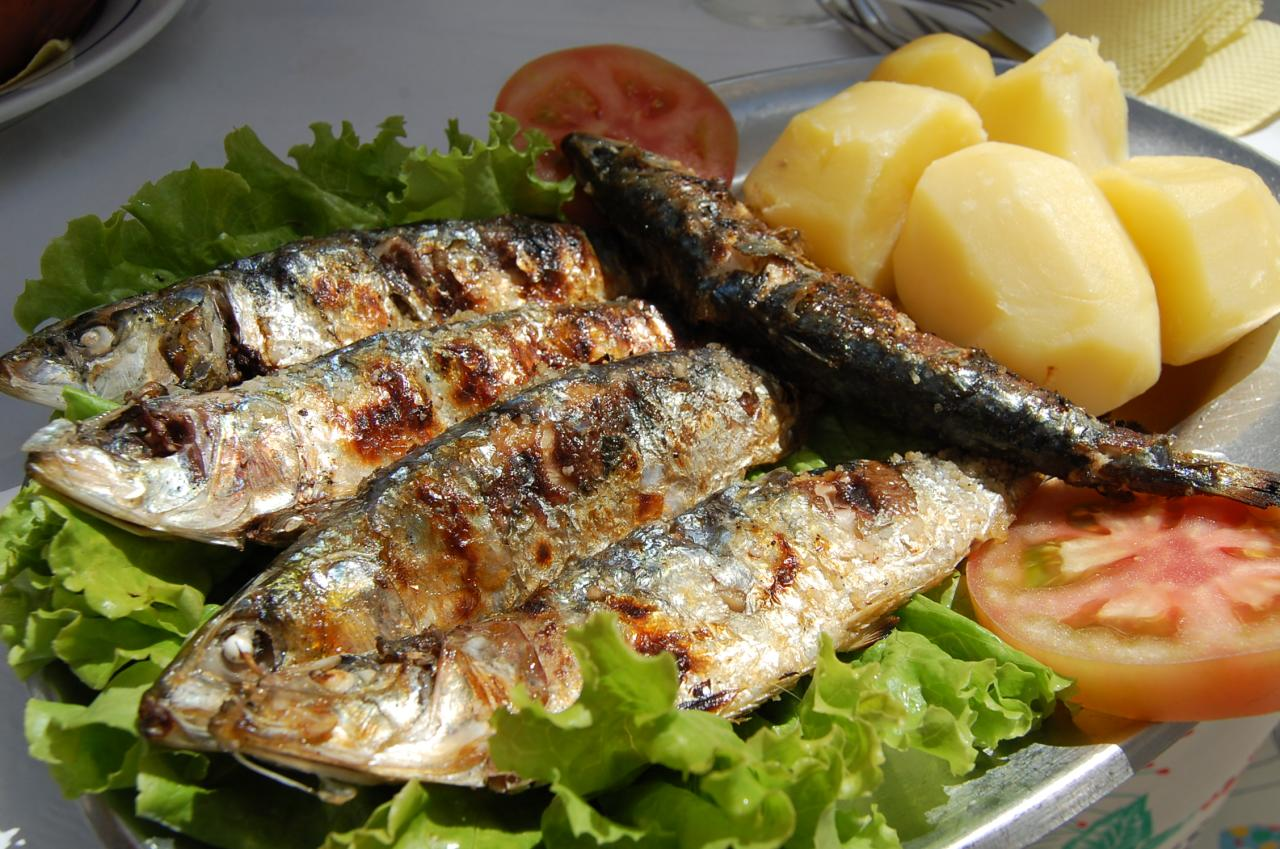
Sardinhas assadas

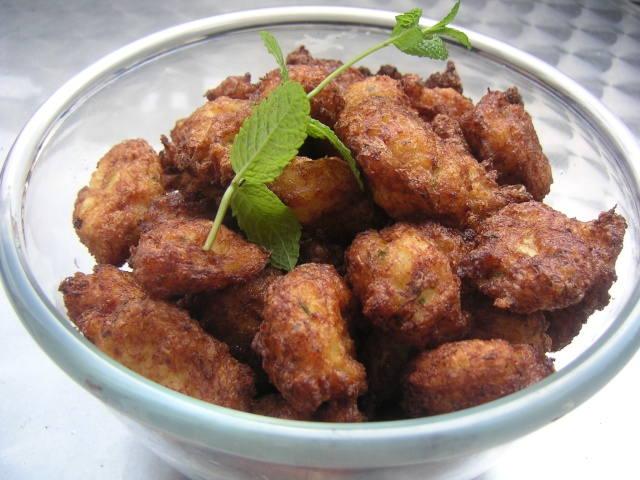
pastéis de bacalhau

- Açorda de bacalhau
- Amêijoas à Bulhão Pato
- Arroz de bacalhau
- Arroz de marisco
- Arroz de pato - A Portuguese variant of duck rice.
- Arroz de polvo - Octopus rice.
- Assado
- Bacalhau
- Bacalhau assado
- Bacalhau à Brás
- Bacalhau à Gomes de Sá
- Bacalhau à Lagareiro
- Bacalhau à minhota
- Bacalhau à Narcisa
- Bacalhau à Zé do Pipo
- Bacalhau com Broa
- Bacalhau com natas
- Bacalhau com todos
- Bacalhau Espiritual
- Bacalhau no Forno com Cebolada
- Bifana
- Bife a cavalo
- Cabidela
- Cafreal
- Caldeirada
- Camarão
- Camarão Tigre grelhado
- Caracóis
- Carne de porco à alentejana
- Carne de vinha d'alhos
- Carne guisada
- Cebolada
- Chanfana
- Choco Frito
- Choquinhos à algarvia
- Churrasco
- Cozido à Portuguesa
- Dobrada
- Dried and salted cod
- Empadão
- Empanada
- Escabeche
- Espada com banana
- Espetada
- Espetada madeirense
- Feijoada
- Feijoada à portuguesa
- Fish moolie
- Francesinha
- Francesinha poveira
- Frango assado
- Frango à passarinho
- Galinha à Africana
- Grilled limpets
- Iscas de fígado
- Jardineira
- Leitão
- Leitão da Bairrada
- Lulas
- Lulas grelhadas
- Meia-desfeita
- Migas
- Migas à alentejana
- Milho Frito
- Moelas
- Papas de sarrabulho
- Pastéis de bacalhau
- Pataniscas
- Peixinhos da horta
- Percebes
- Pescada à Poveira
- Piri piri
- Polvo à Lagareiro
- Portuguese grelhado
- Prego
- Rojões
- Sapateira recheada
- Sardinhas assadas
- Torresmo
- Torricado
- Tripas
- Tripas à moda do Porto

=== Breads ===
- Bica d'azeite
- Bolo do caco
- Broa
- Broa de Avintes
- Fogaça da Feira
- Folar
- Pão de Leite
- Pão de Mafra
- Pão doce
- Regueifa

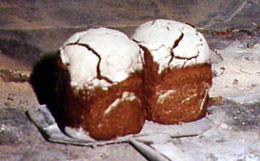
Broa de Avintes

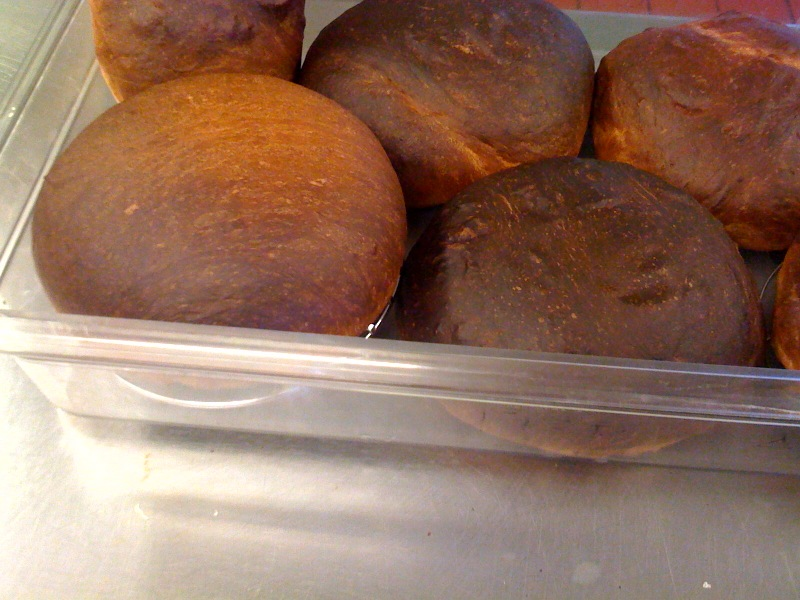
Portuguese sweet bread

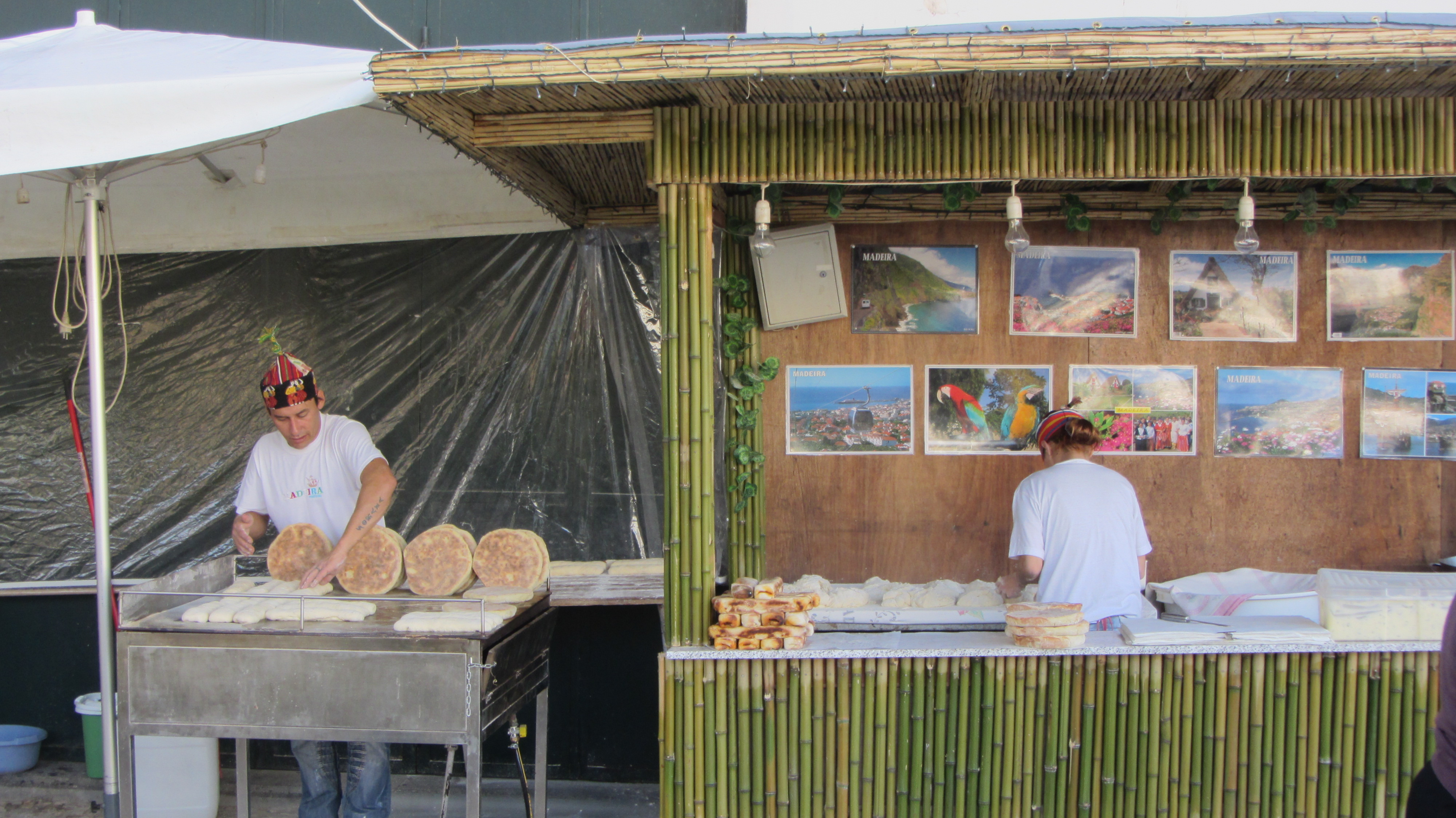
A Bolo do Caco stand in Maderia

=== Cheeses ===
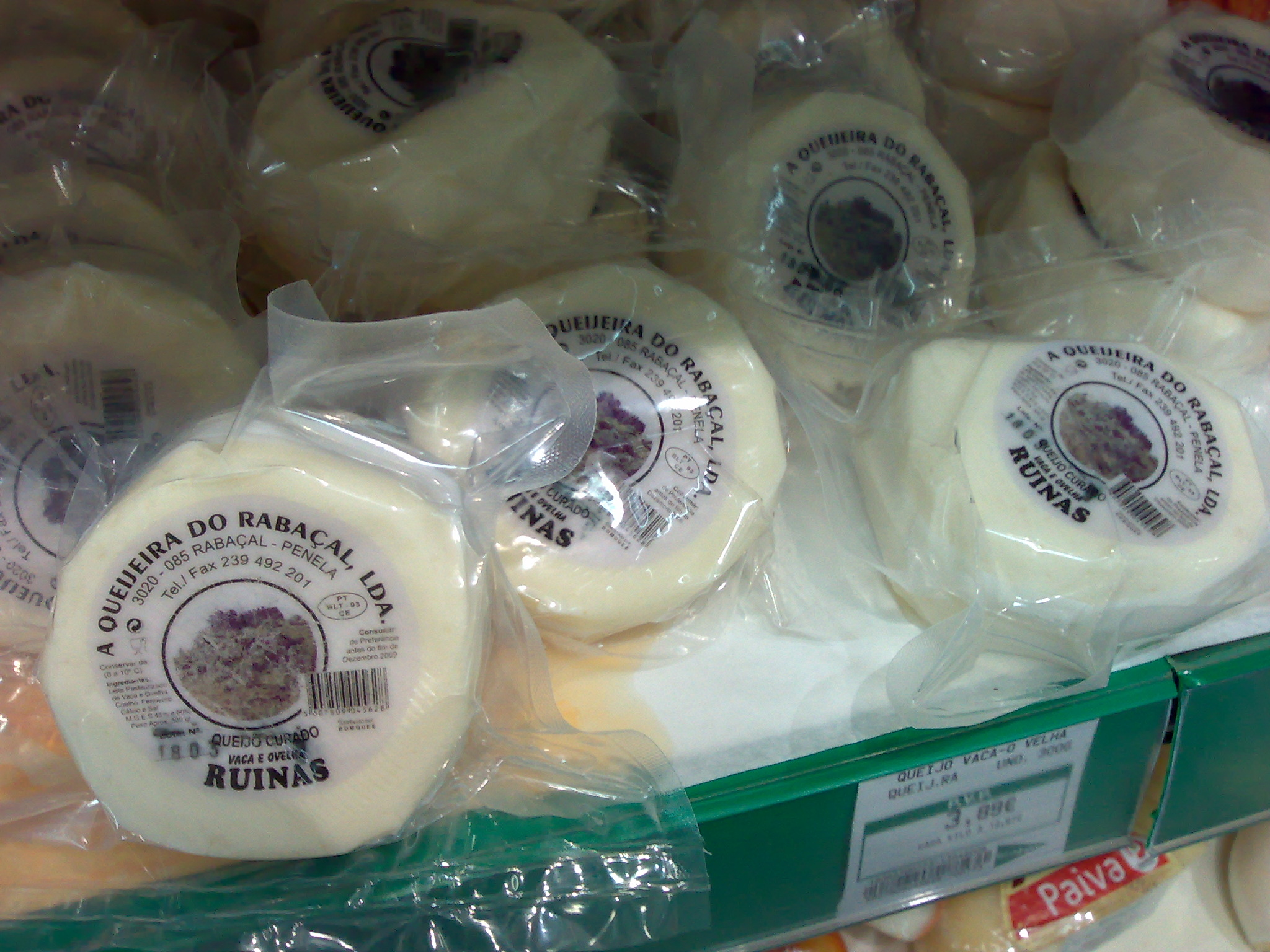
Rabaçal cured cheese

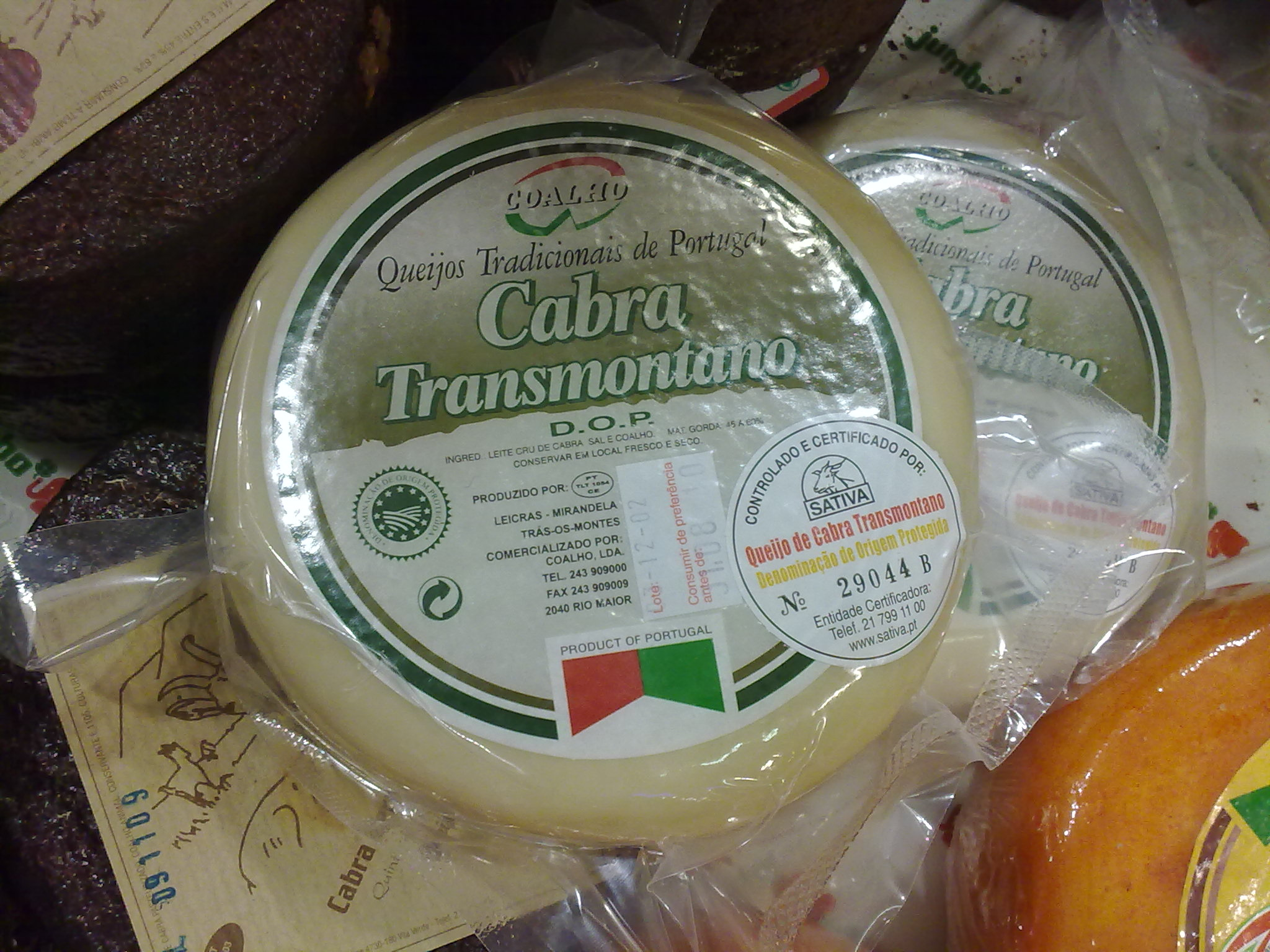
Transmontano cheese

- Queijo de Azeitão
- Queijo de Cabra Transmontano
- Queijo de Évora
- Queijo de Nisa
- Queijo de Ovelha Amanteigado
- Queijo de Tomar
- Queijo do Pico
- Queijo fresco
- Queijo mestiço de Tolosa
- Queijo Rabaçal
- Queijos da Beira Baixa
  - Queijo Amarelo da Beira Baixa
  - Queijo de Castelo Branco
  - Queijo Picante da Beira Baixa
- Queijo Santarém
- Queijo São Jorge
- Queijo Serpa
- Queijo Serra da Estrela
- Queijo Terrincho
- Requeijão
- Saloio
- Travia da Beira Baixa

=== Desserts and sweets ===
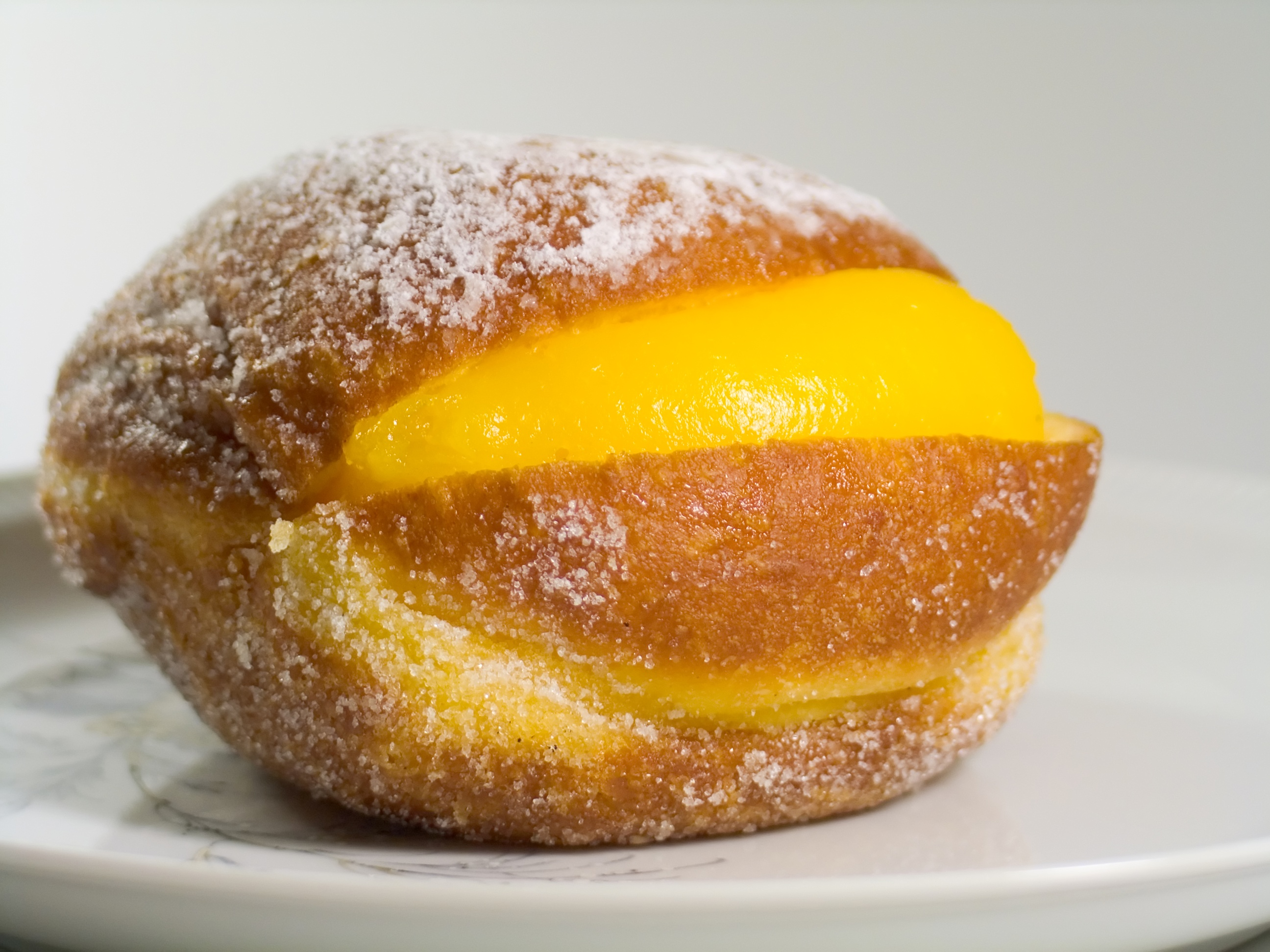
A bola de Berlim from Portugal

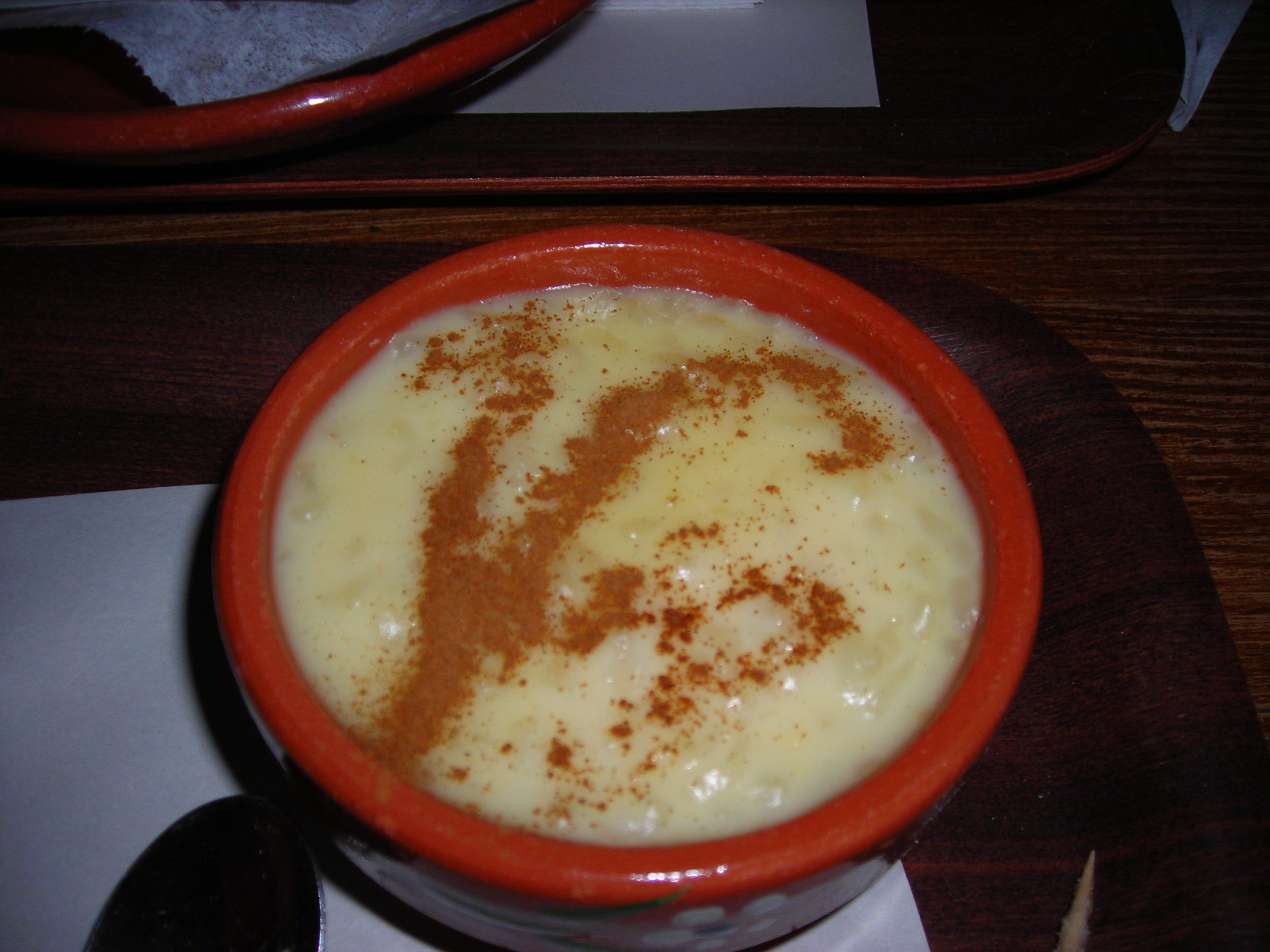
Arroz doce from Portugal

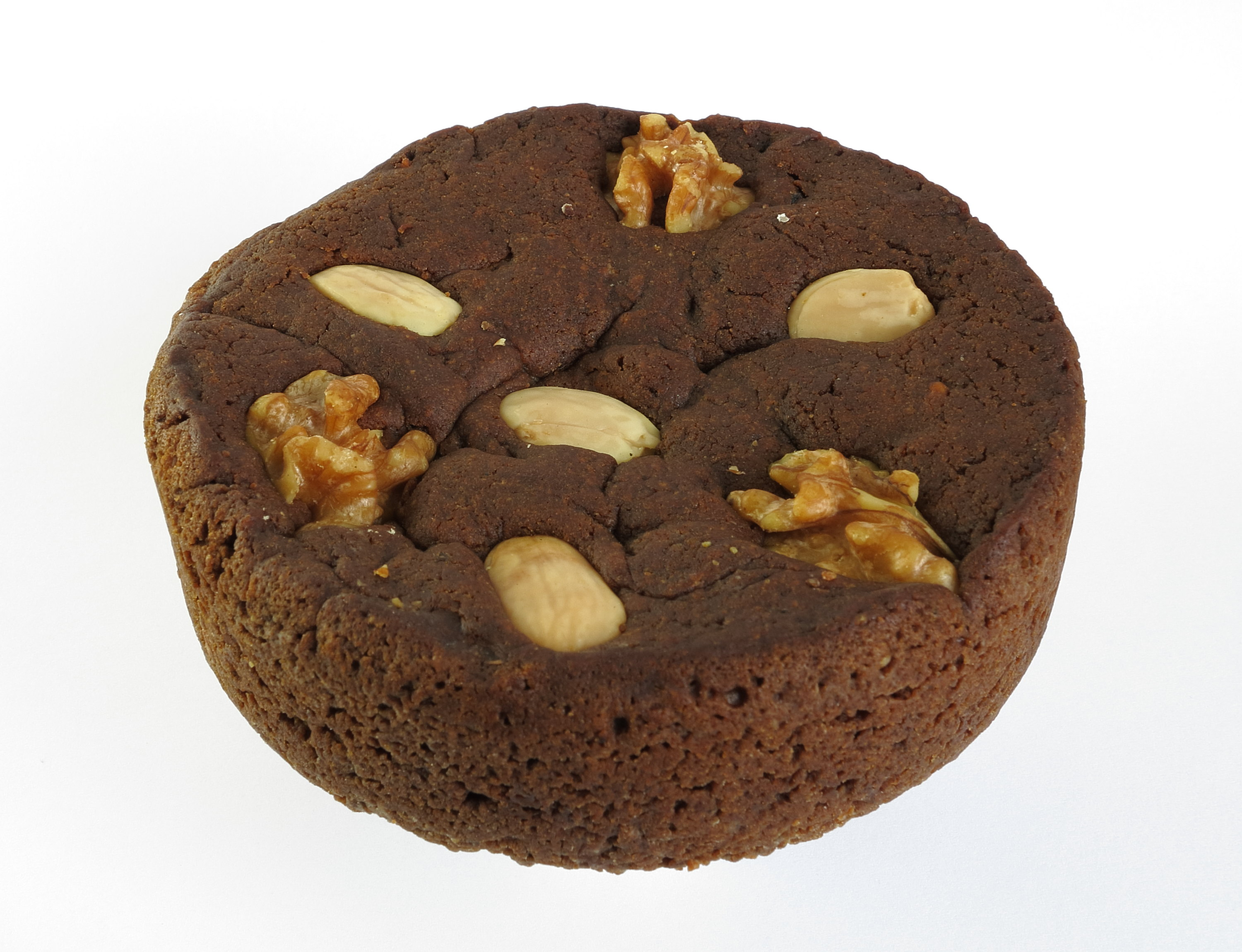
Madeira honey cake - Bolo de Mel da Madeira

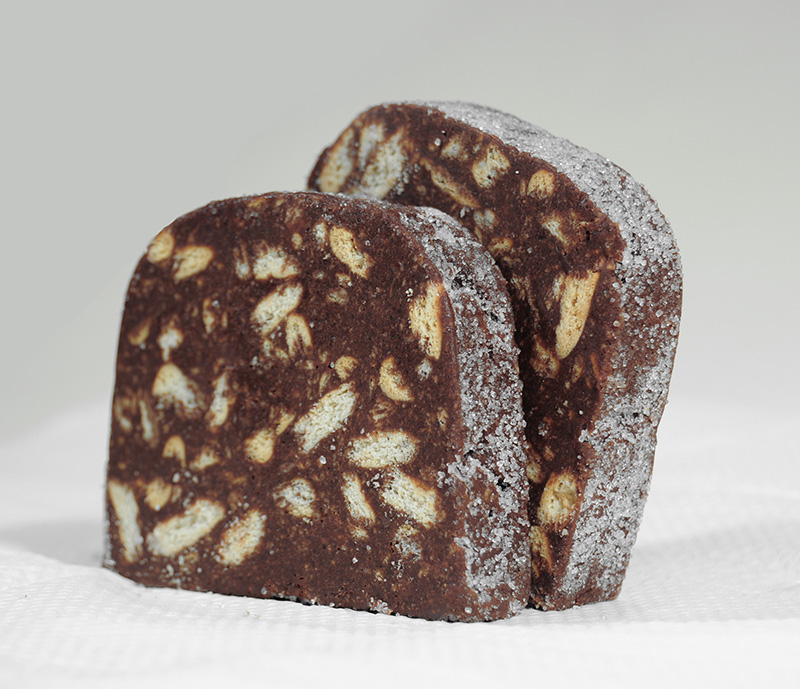
Chocolate salami, salame de chocolate

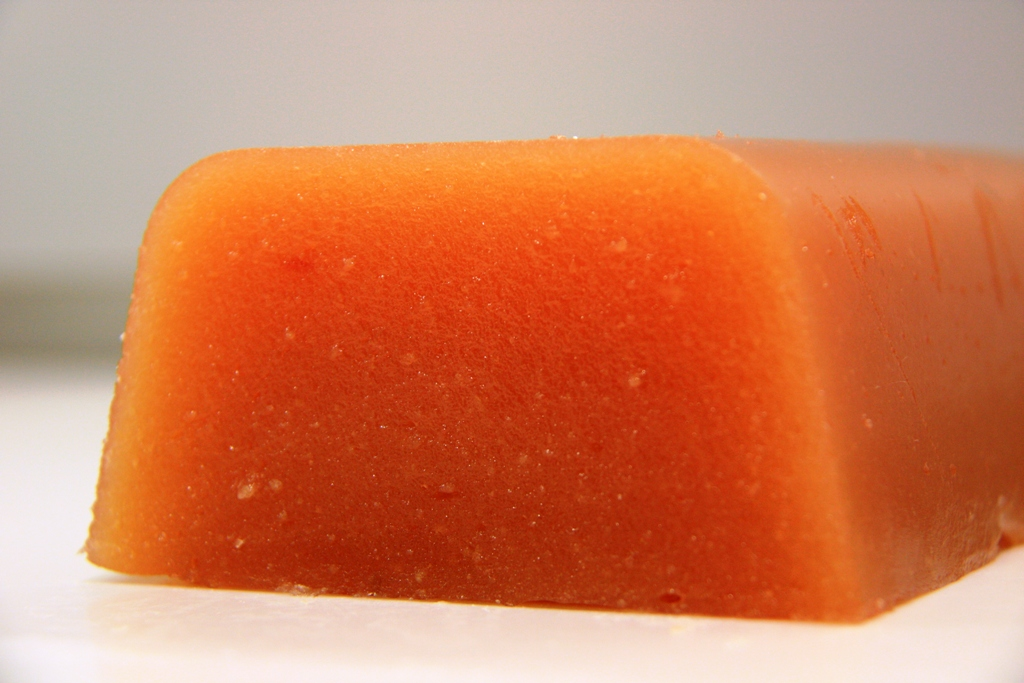
Quince marmalade - Marmelada

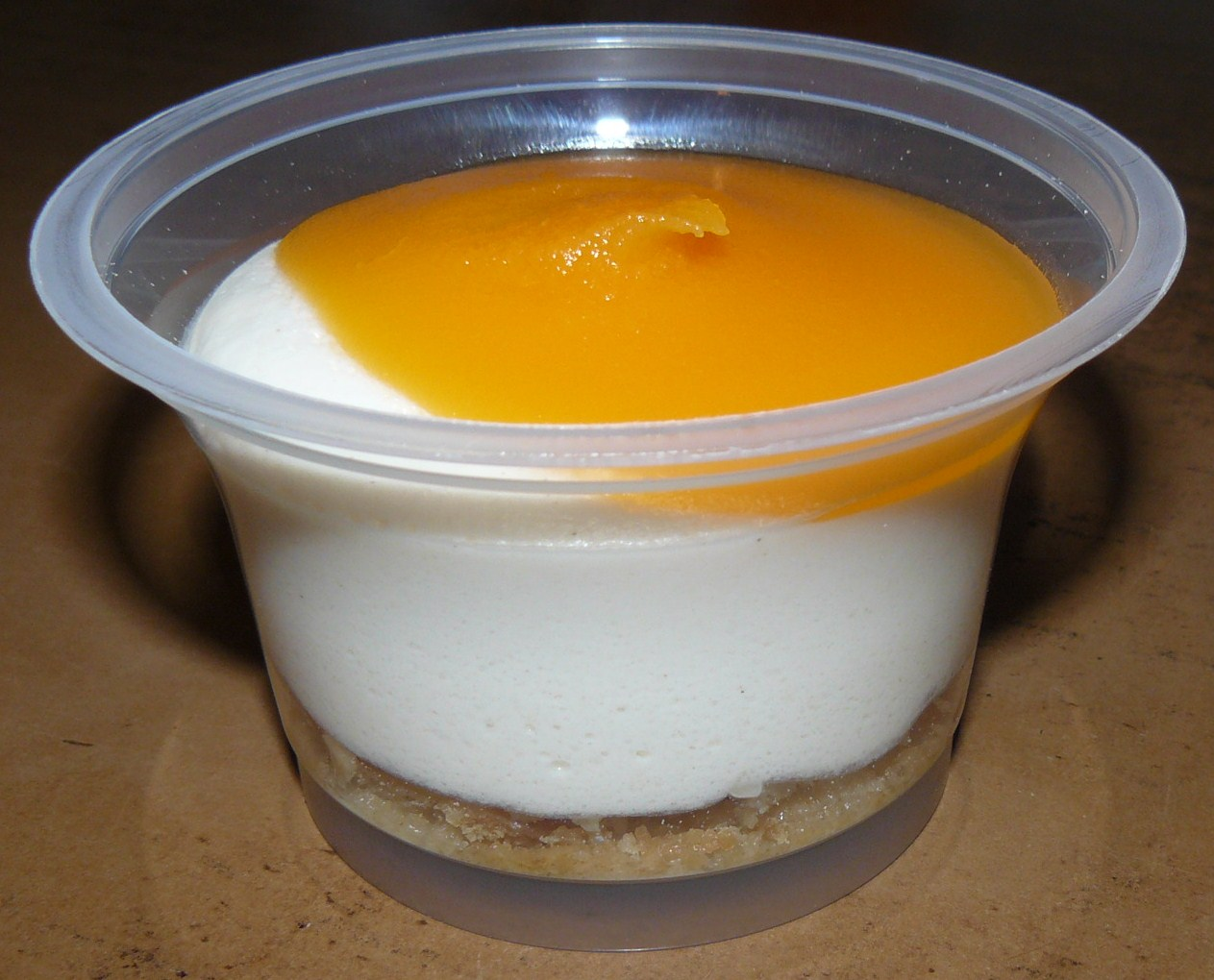
Natas do Céu dessert

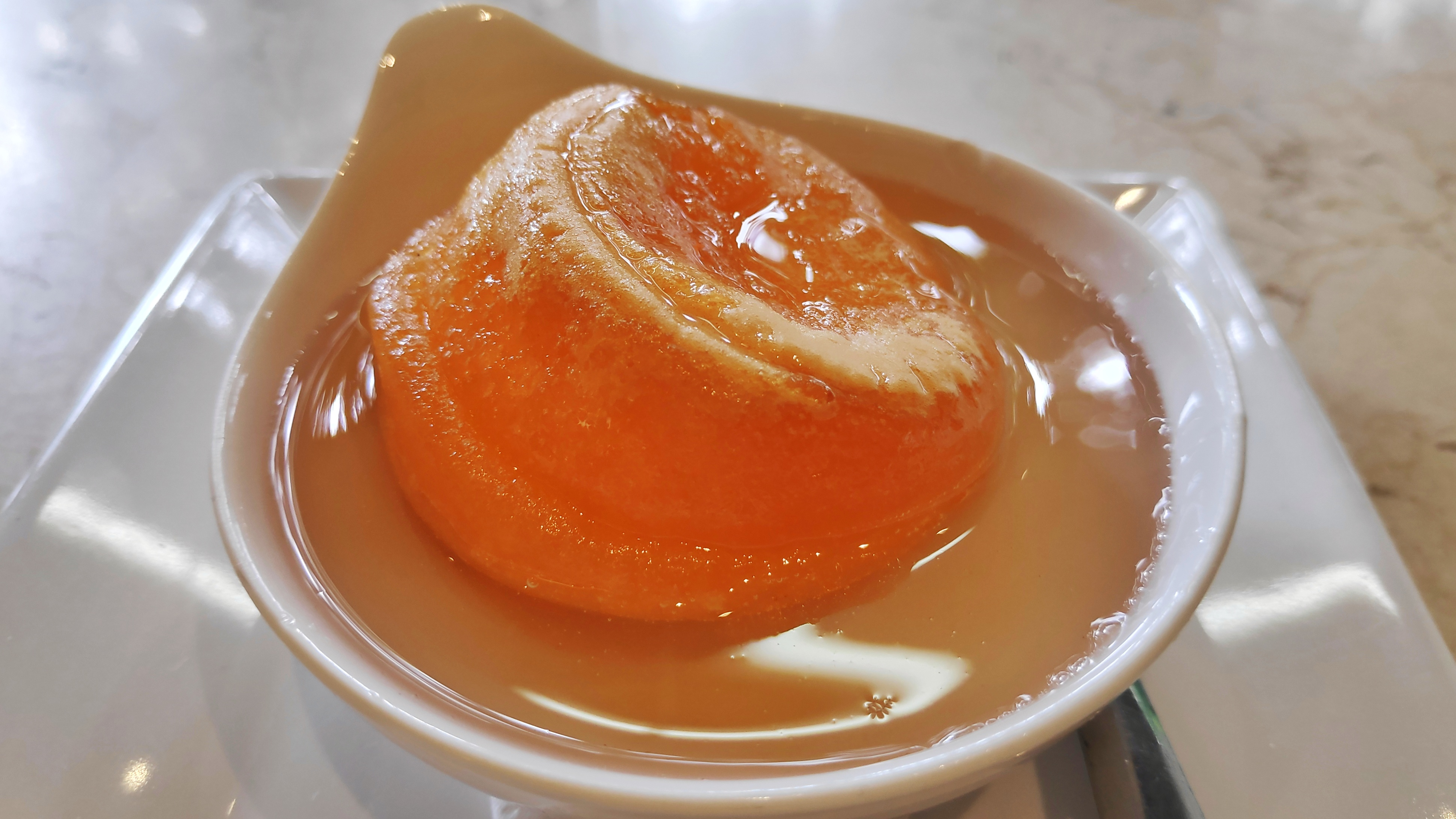
Angel's double-chin - Papo d’Anjo

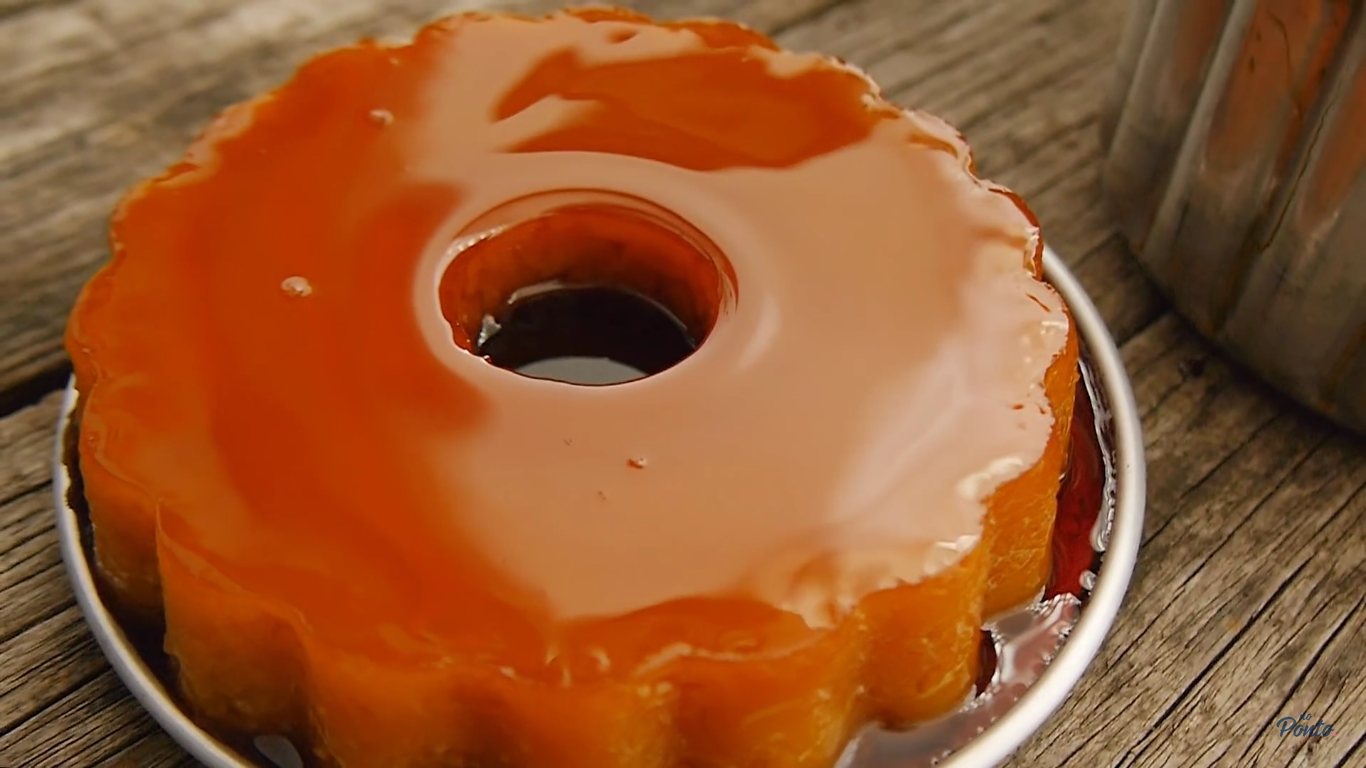
Priscos Abbot pudding - Pudim Abade de Priscos

See also: Conventual sweets

- Aletria
- Ambrosia
- Areias
- Arroz doce
- Arrufada de Coimbra
- Azevia
- Baba de camelo
- Barquilhos de Setúbal
- Barriga de freira
- Bilharaco
- Biscoitos de Louriçal
- Bola de Berlim
- Bolacha Maria
- Bolinhos de côco
- Bolo das Alhadas
- Bolo de arroz
- Bolo de bolacha
- Bolo de mel
- Bolo Rainha
- Bolo Rei
- Bola Doce Mirandesa
- Brisas do Lis
- Broa castelar
- Broas de mel
- Caladinhos
- Cavacas
- Cavacas de Resende
- Celestes de Santa Clara
- Chamuça
- Chestnut pudding
- Chocolate salami
- Churro
- Clarinhas de Esposende
- Coscorões de Mel
- Delícias do Convento
- Doce fino
- Doce de gila
- Doce de ovos
- Dom Rodrigo
- Empada
- Encharcada
- Espigas Doces
- Enxovalhada de Torresmos
- Esquecidos da Guarda
- Fartura
- Fatias do Freixo
- Fatias de Tomar
- Filhós
- Fios de ovos
- Fofas de Faial
- Folar
- Folhado
- Folhados de Tavira
- Goiabada
- Guardanapo
- Jesuíta
- Lampreia de Portalegre
- Leite creme
- Línguas de veado
- Malassada
- Manjar branco de Coimbra
- Marmelada
- Marzipan
- Mil-folhas
- Morgado
- Nabada
- Napolitana de chocolate
- Natas do Céu
- Ovos Moles de Aveiro
- Palha de Abrantes
- Pampilho
- Pão de Deus
- Pão de Ló
- Pão de rala
- Pãozinho fino
- Papo-de-anjo
- Pastel de feijão
- Pastel de nata
- Pastel de Tentúgal
- Pastel de Vouzela
- Patas de veado
- Pudim
- Pudim Abade de Priscos
- Pudim Molotov
- Queijada
- Queijada de Évora
- Queijadinha
- Queijinhos do Céu
- Quindim
- Rabanada
- Rebuçados de ovos
- Regueifa de canela
- Regueifa da Páscoa
- Rissol
- Roscas de amêndoa
- Sardinhas doces de Trancoso
- Serradura
- Sericaia
- Sonhos de Natal
- Suspiros
- Tarte de amêndoa
- Tigelada
- Torta
- Torta de Azeitão
- Toucinho-do-Céu
- Travesseiros da Piriquita
- Travesseiros de Sintra
- Tremoços
- Tripa de Aveiro
- Trouxas da Malveira
- Trouxas de ovos das Caldas
- Velhote
- Viúvas

=== Sausages and hams ===
- Alheira
- Alheira frita
- Azaruja sausage
- Botelo
- Chouriço
- Chouriço assado
- Chouriço doce
- Enchido
- Farinheira
- Linguiça
- Momas
- Morcela
- Paia
- Paio
- Paiola
- Presunto
- Tripa enfarinhada

=== Soups and stews ===
- Açorda
- Açorda de marisco
- Caldo do forno
- Caldo verde
- Canja a doentes
- Canja de galinha
- Canja de Goa
- Caril de frango
- Cebolada
- Chora de bacalhau
- Cozido à portuguesa
- Gaspacho
- Pica Pau
- Sopa da Beira
- Sopa da pedra
- Sopa de agrião e feijão (watercress and beans)
- Sopa de bacalhau dos campinos
- Sopa de cação
- Sopa de casamento
- Sopa de castanhas
- Sopa de lingueirão
- Sopa de peixe
- Sopa de tomate com ovos escalfados
- Sopa do Espírito Santo
- Vinhadalhos
- Xarém – a thick soup from Algarve, Portugal.
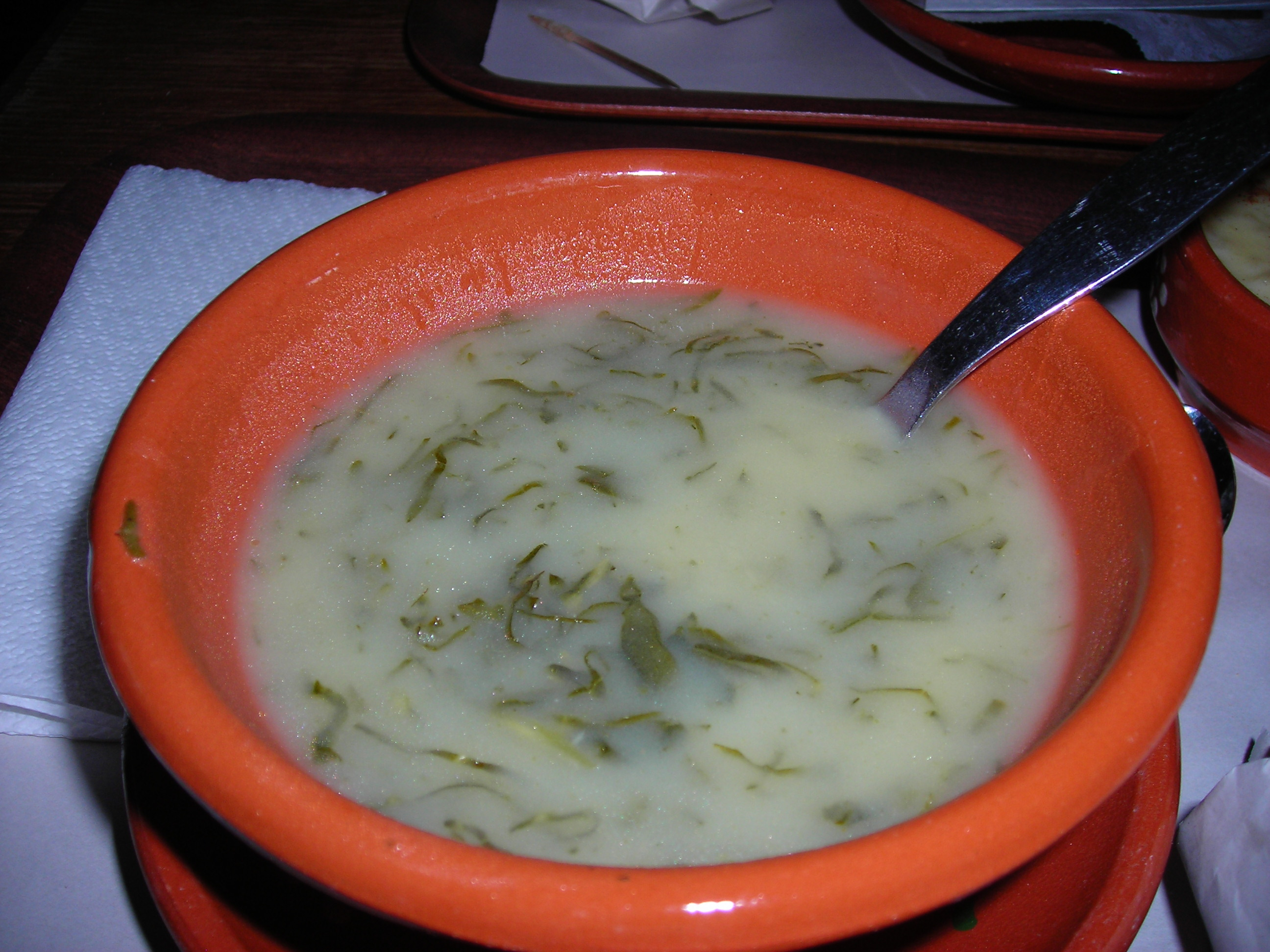
Caldo verde served in a traditional tigela

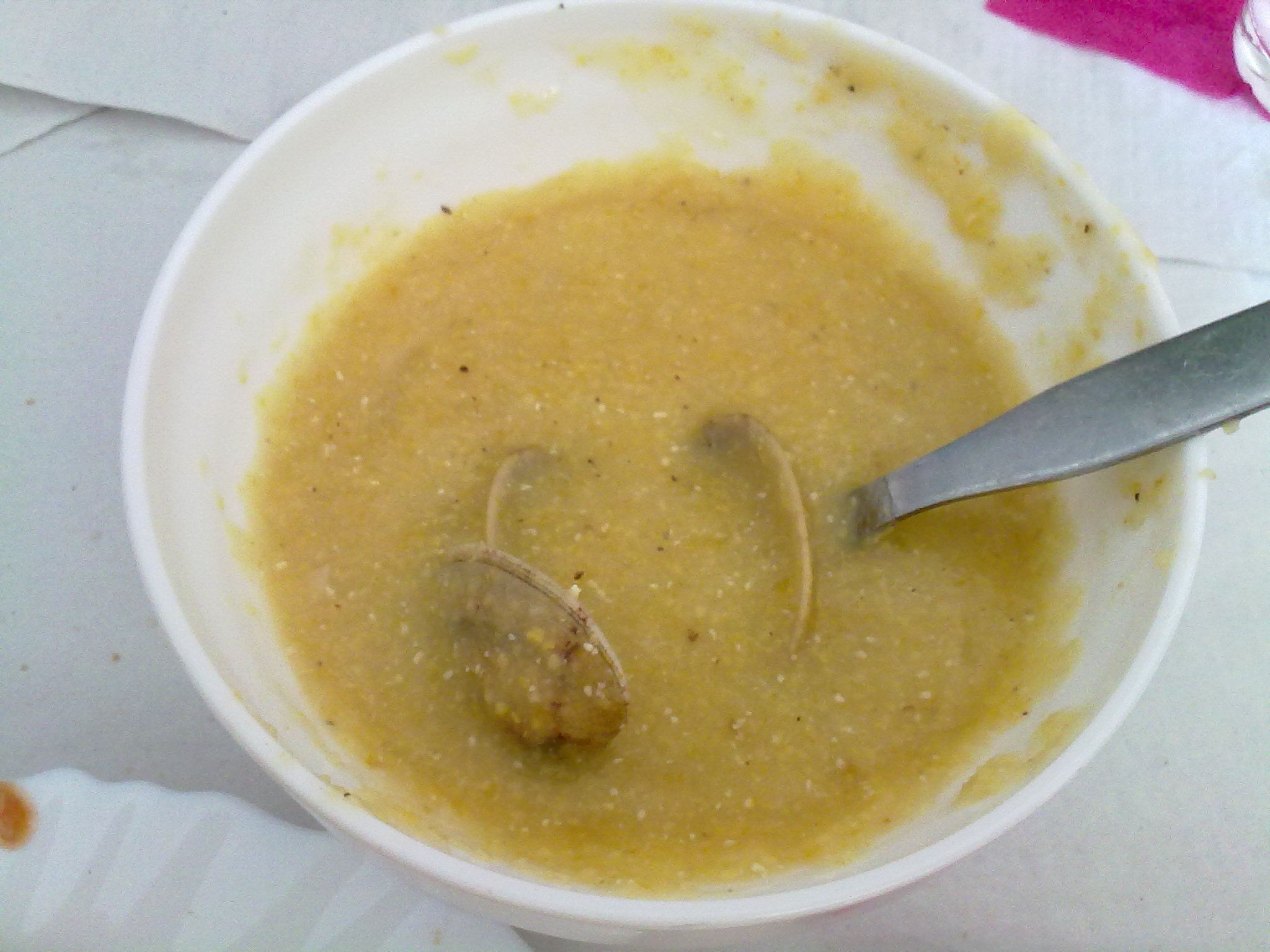
Xarém of the Algarve

== Beverages ==
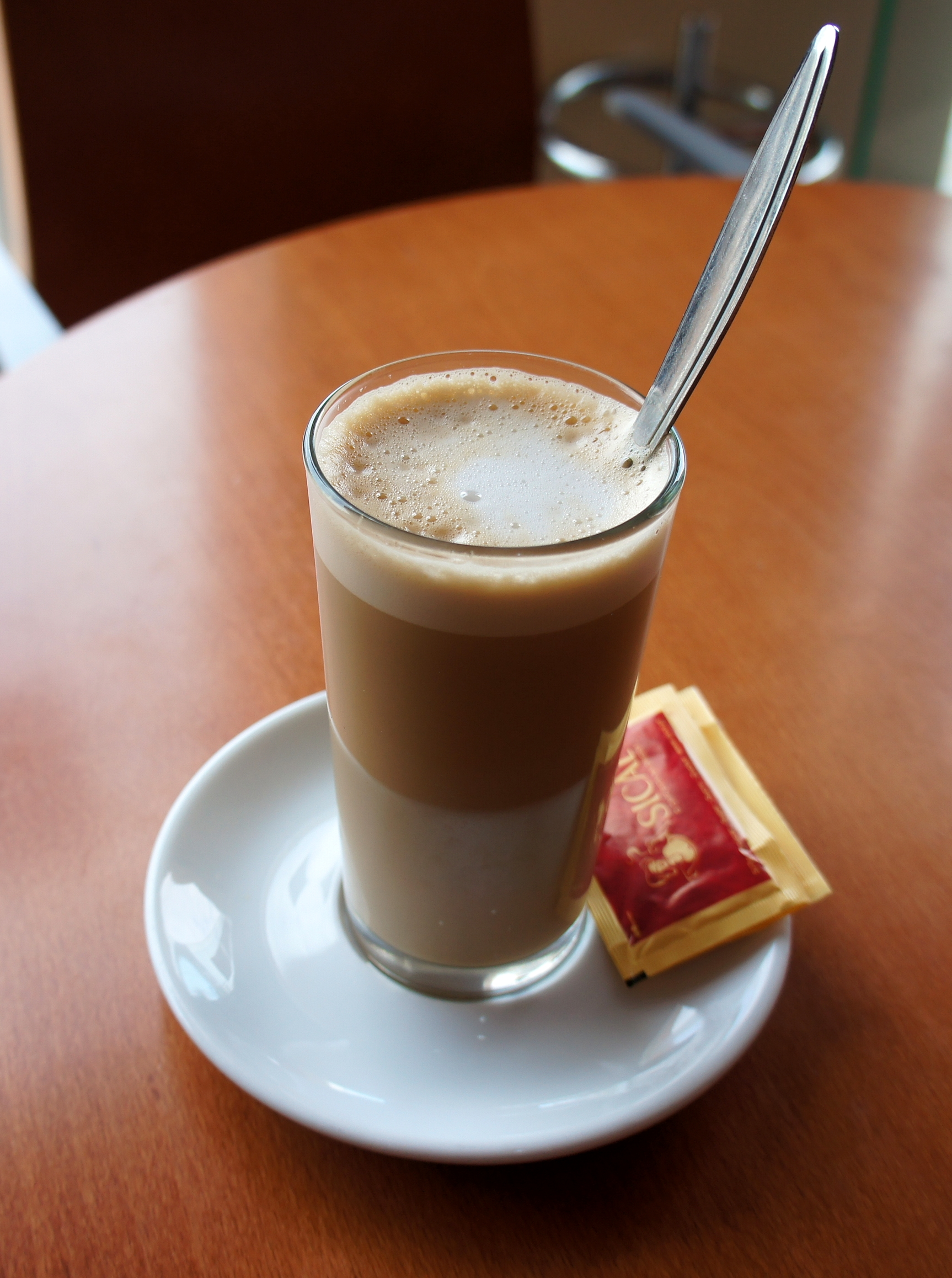
Galão

- Abatanado
- Bica
- Café com cheirinho
- Carioca
- Galão
- Garoto
- Laranjada
- Mazagran
- Meia de leite
- Pingado

=== Alcoholic beverages ===
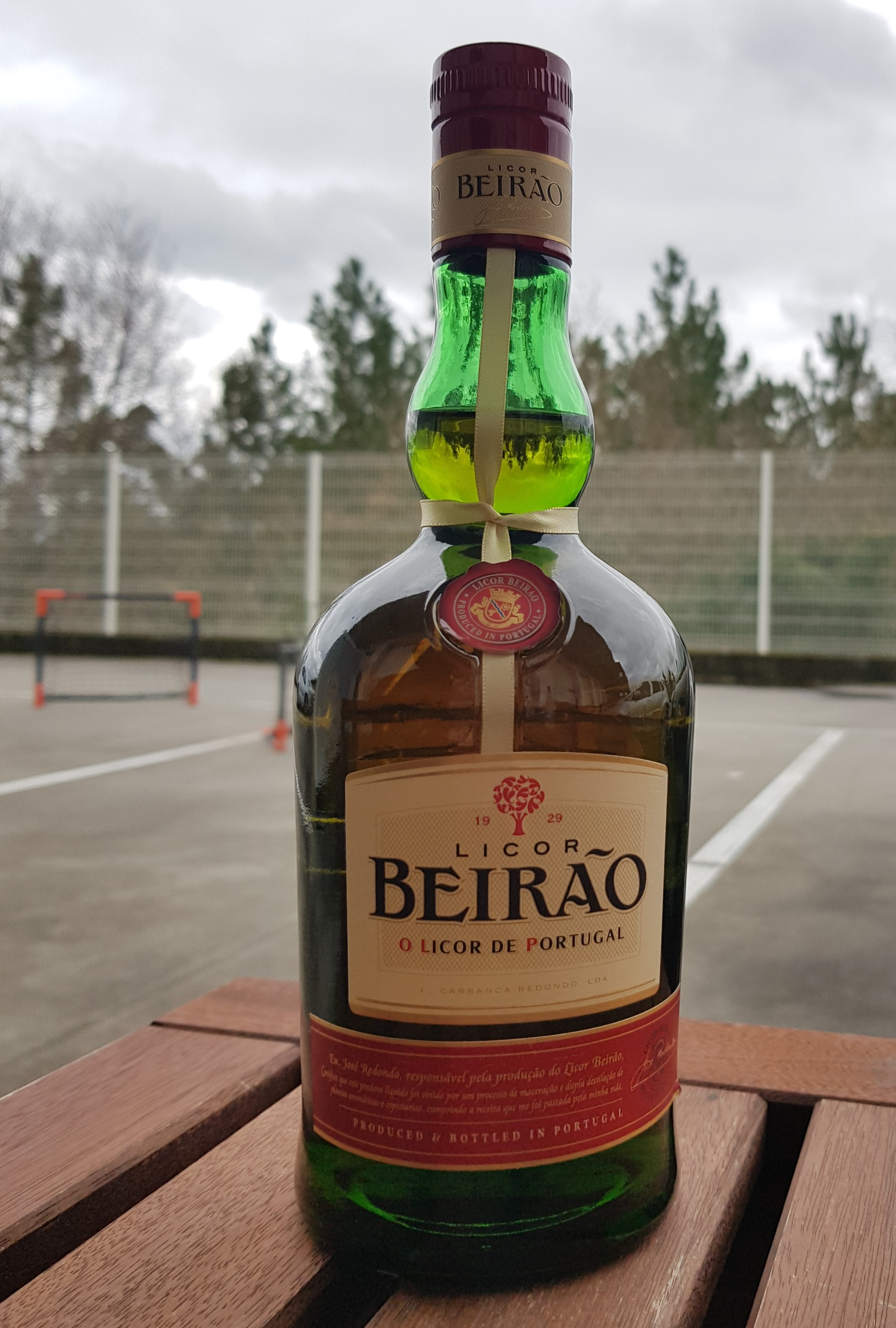
Beirão liqueur

- Água-pé
- Aguardente
- Bagaço
- Ginjinha
- Granito Montemorense
- Licor Beirão
- Liquorice stick
- Macieira Brandy
- Madeira Brewery
- Medronho
- Nikita
- Pé-de-cabra
- Poncha
- Port wine
- Sangria
- Sagres - leading beer brand.
- Super Bock – leading beer brand.

== See also ==
- Cataplana – a cookware item used to prepare Portuguese seafood dishes
- List of Portugal food and drink products with protected status
- Macanese cuisine – is unique to Macau and consists of a blend of southern Chinese and Portuguese cuisines
- Portuguese wine
