= Guardanapo =

Portuguese sponge cake dessert

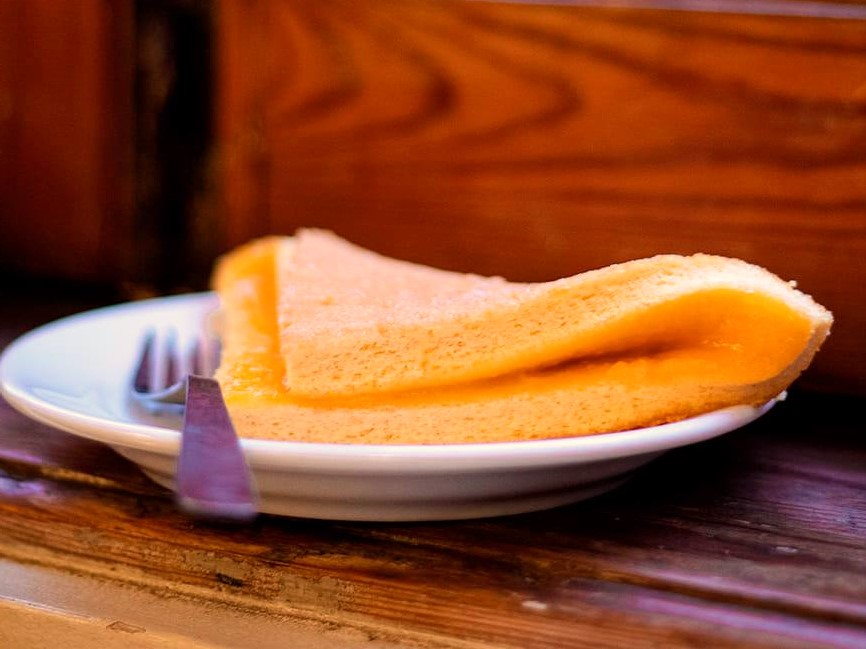
- Alternative names: Massa de lencinhos Pastas finas
- Type: Cake
- Course: Sobremesa
- Place of origin: Portugal
- Main ingredients: Sponge cake (wheat flour, eggs, sugar, baking powder), doces de ovos (egg yolks, sugar, water)
- Ingredients generally used: Lemon zest, vanilla
- Food energy (per serving): 155 kcal (650 kJ)
- Similar dishes: Torta de Azeitão, Torta de doce de ovos

Guardanapo (lit. 'serviette') is a Portuguese sponge cake traditionally filled with doces de ovos and dusted with sugar. The cake is aptly named after the shape of the dessert, which resembles a folded napkin.

It is also known as massa de lencinhos (lit. 'tissue paper dough') or pastas finas (lit. 'fine dough').

The cake may be flavored with chocolate, and instead of doces de ovos it may be filled with pastry cream, chocolate, gianduia, pineapple, coconut, or raspberry.

To prepare guardanapos, a large and thin sheet of sponge cake is baked. The filling is spread over the cake and cut into square pieces. The cakes are formed by folding the corner of the cake in half diagonally.

== See also ==
- Portuguese Cuisine
- Pão de Ló
