= Cebolada =

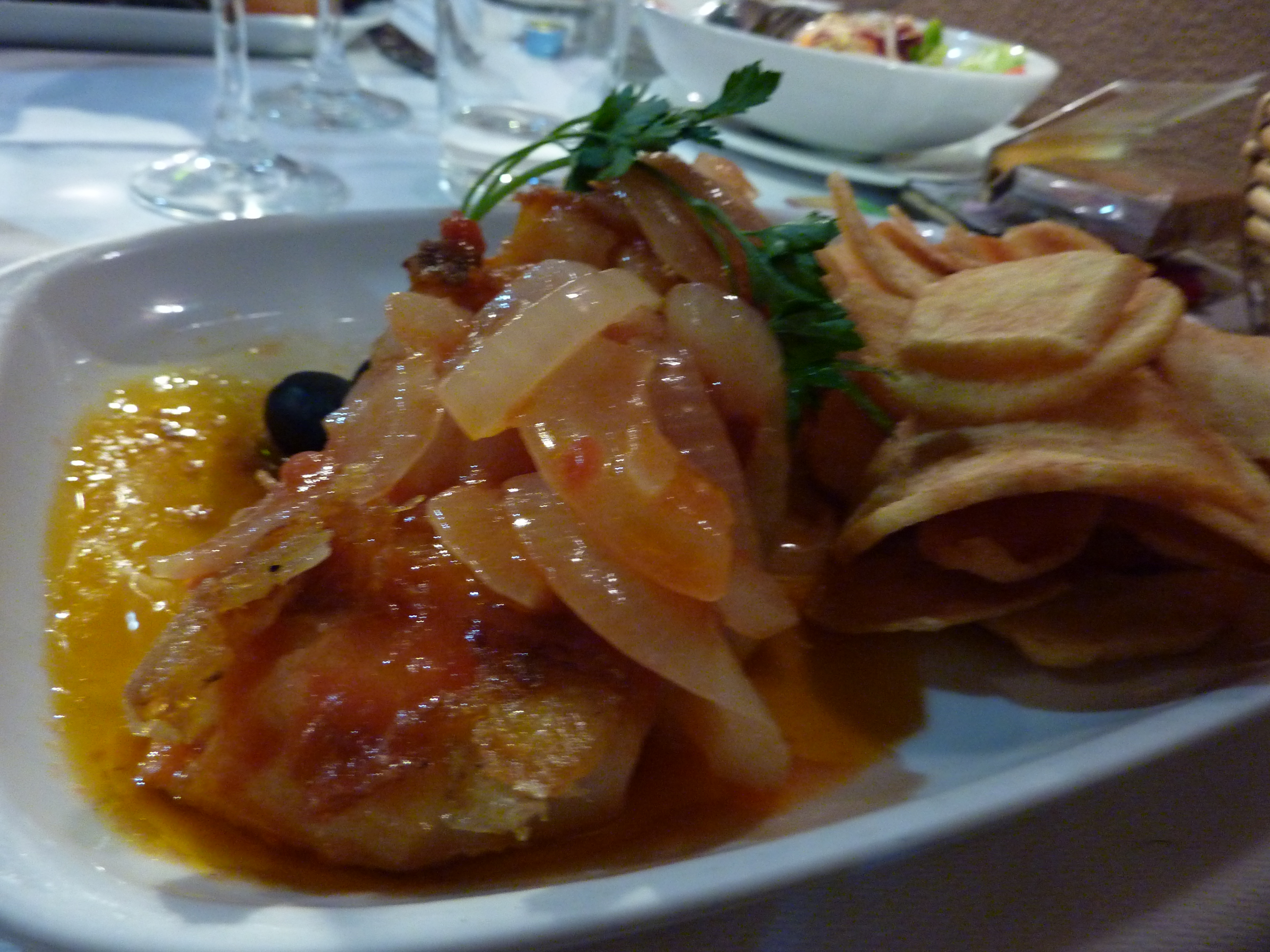
- Type: Stew, sauce, or paste
- Place of origin: Portugal
- Main ingredients: Onion

Cebolada is a Portuguese onion stew, onion sauce or paste that is prepared with onion as a primary ingredient. Versions prepared as a paste may be slow-cooked.

== Dishes with cebolada ==
It may accompany various dishes, such as seafood dishes prepared with swordfish steak. Atum de cebolada is a dish prepared with tuna steak and cebolada that is prepared with caramelized onions.

Cebolada is used on beef dishes such as bifes de cebolada (also referred to as bife de cebolada), which uses thinly sliced steak and cebolada. Additional ingredients in the dish's preparation include white wine, vinegar and butter. Bifes de cebolada is a frequent menu item in Portuguese restaurants, and traditionally it is served with Portuguese fried potatoes.

== See also ==
- List of onion dishes
- List of Portuguese dishes
- List of vegetable dishes
