= Carne de porco à alentejana =

Portuguese pork dish

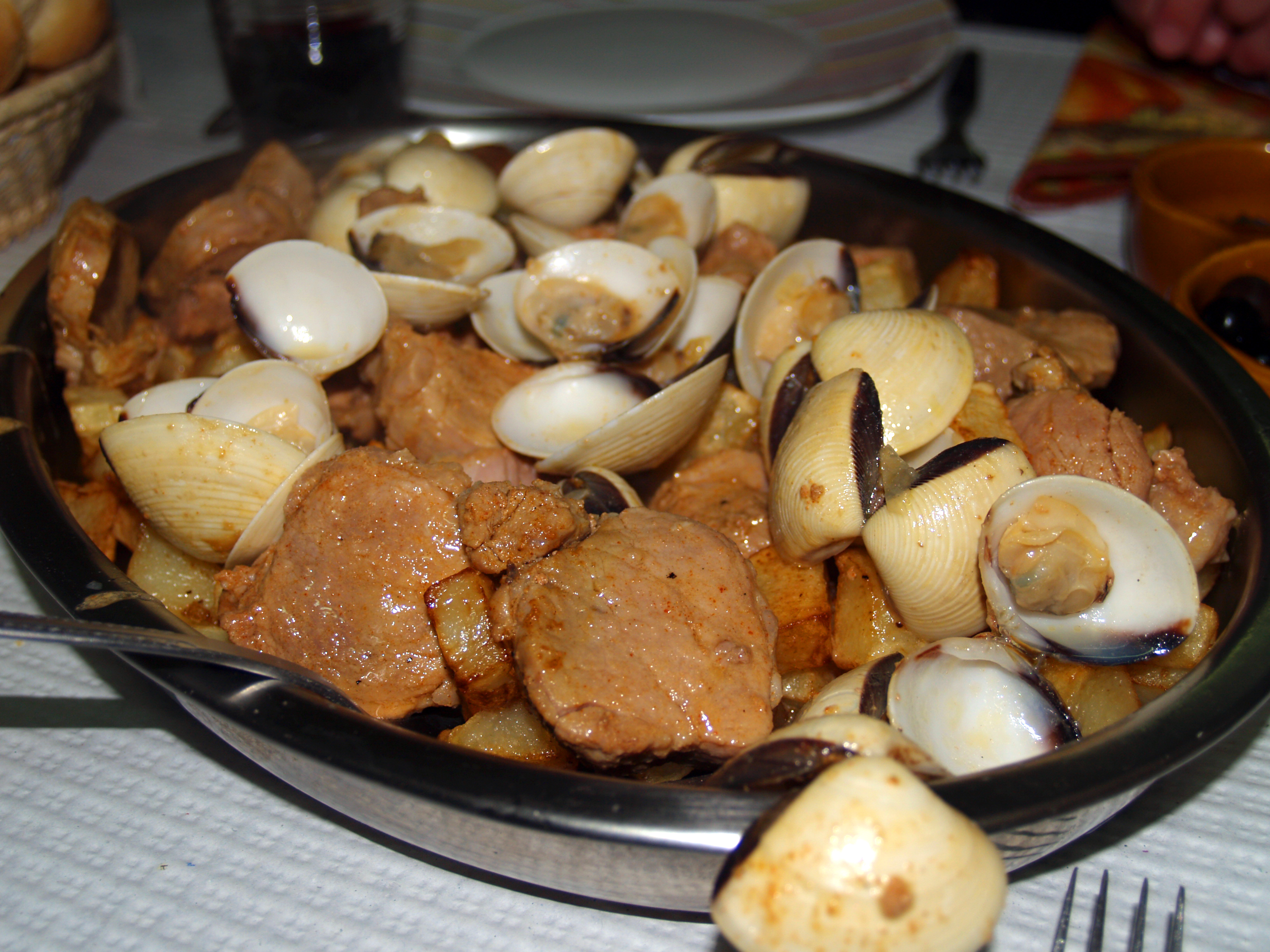
Carne de porco à alentejana

Carne de porco à alentejana (pork with clams) is one of the most traditional and popular pork dishes of Portuguese cuisine. It is a combination of pork and clams, with potatoes and coriander. Usually, pork is marinated for some time in white wine, paprika, red pepper paste, chopped garlic, coriander, bay leaf, salt and pepper. Cumin is often added in northern Portugal as well. It is then fried until golden brown, when clams are added and cooked. Traditionally, this dish is served with cubed fries or baked potatoes.

Its origin is uncertain, the name would appear to be from Alentejo, but this is disputed by some, who claim that its roots are in Alverca. The reason behind it are the clams, who are much more popular in seaside towns rather than places far from the ocean, like the majority of Alentejo, who only has one sizeable fishing port, Sines and small fishing villages on the coast and has a mainly meat-based cuisine. It may be an example of fusion cuisine between pork dishes of inner Alentejo and seafood dishes of coastal Algarve.

== See also ==
- Rojões
- List of Portuguese dishes
- List of meat and potato dishes
