= Papas de sarrabulho =

Portuguese dish

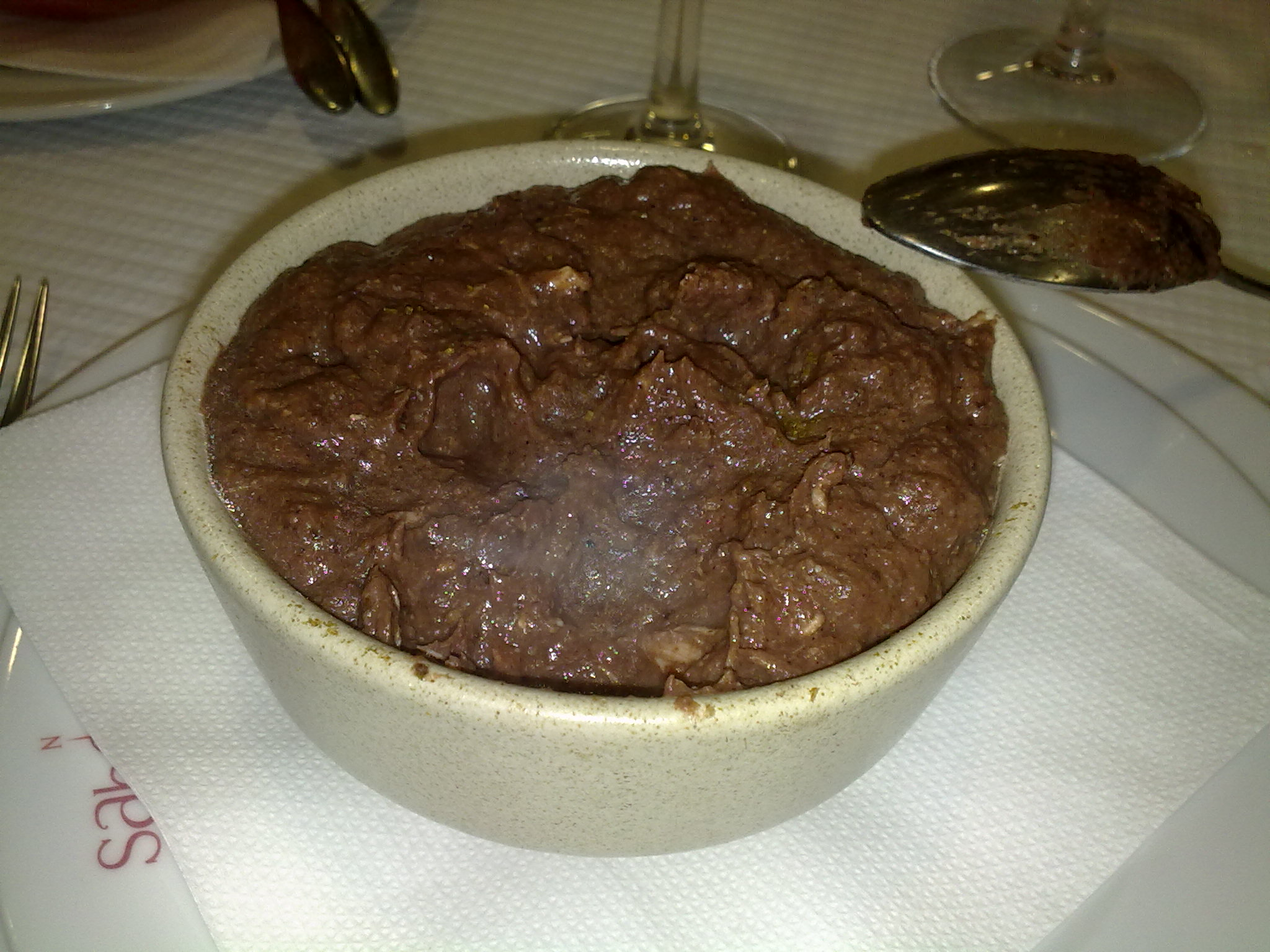
Papas de sarrabulho, from Porto, 2009

Papas de Sarrabulho, in English referred to as Sarrabulho porridge, is a typical Portuguese dish. It comes from Minho Province and surrounds, in the Norte Region of Portugal, mainly in the cities of Porto, Guimarães, Braga, Amares and Barcelos.

Papas is made with pork blood, chicken meat, pork, salpicão sausage, presunto, chorizo, cumin, clove, nutmeg, lemon, piri-piri and bread or cornmeal, among other ingredients. It is served as a soup or as an accompaniment, to rojões for example. It is traditionally eaten with Vinho verde or red wine.

Papas de Sarrabulho is made in the winter, as that is generally when pigs are slaughtered. In addition, papas is a very strong dish, more appetising in cold winter weather. In warm summer weather, pork blood, as a highly perishable ingredient, would tend to deteriorate too quickly. It is common to find it on restaurant menus in the north-west of Portugal, in their home area of the Norte Region; it is rare to find it served elsewhere in the country.
