= Fatias do Freixo =

Portuguese sponge cake

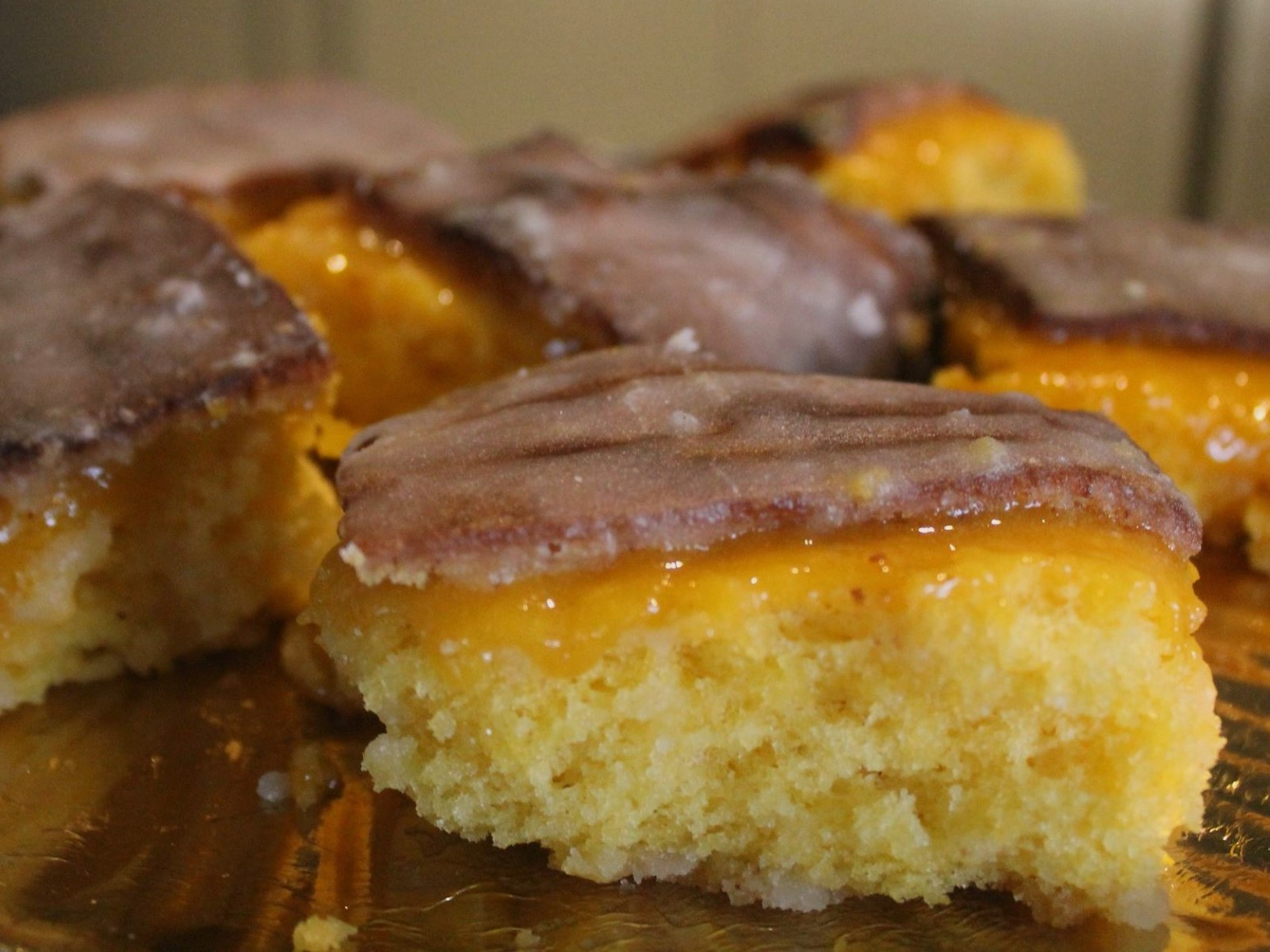
- Fatias do Freixo
- Type: Conventual sweet Sponge cake
- Course: Sobremesa
- Place of origin: Portugal
- Region or state: Marco de Canaveses
- Main ingredients: Egg yolks, sugar, wheat flour
- Similar dishes: Pão de Ló

Fatias do Freixo (lit. 'slices of Freixo') is a traditional Portuguese sponge cake from Freixo, Marco de Canaveses originating from the convents in the 1600s. The cake is topped with doces de ovos with a caramelized pastry.

== Background ==
The Pão de Ló sponge cake dessert has been made exclusively at the family pastelaria Casa dos Lenteirões since 1819. A favorite dessert of Luís I of Portugal, fatias de Freixo is made with eggs, sugar, and wheat flour.

The recipe for fatias do Freixo is believed to have been obtained by the aunts of Maria Helena Vieira da Silva, who were associated with the convent but left to assist the family and open the pastelaria. It was sold at fairs and to pilgrims. The recipe is currently only known to two persons in the family.

Another variation of the dessert is from Torres Vedras, inspired by the Palácio do Freixo in Porto in the 1800s. The puff pastry envelopes a filling made of egg yolks and almonds.

== See also ==
- Pão de Ló
- Portuguese cuisine
