= Bacalhau com todos =

Cod recipe in Portuguese cuisine

Bacalhau com todos (literally meaning "codfish with everything" in Portuguese) is a common bacalhau recipe in Portuguese cuisine. It consists of boiled codfish, boiled vegetables (such as potato, carrots and cabbage), and hard-boiled egg. It is served seasoned with olive oil infused with garlic and, depending on taste, also white wine vinegar.

Bacalhau com todos is customarily served for Christmas Eve dinner, Consoada.

== See also ==
- List of Portuguese dishes
