= Baba de camelo =

Portuguese dessert

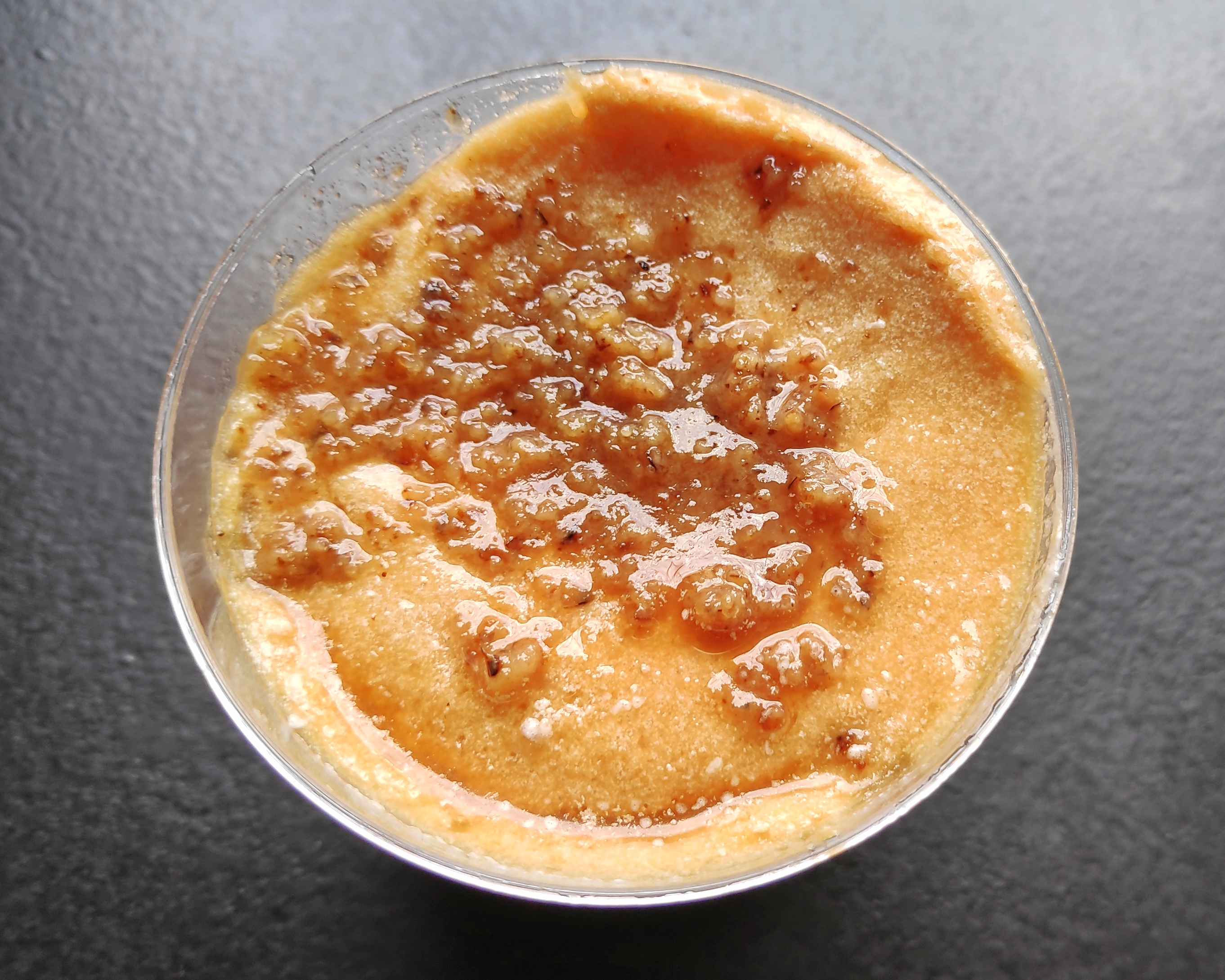
A bowl of baba de camelo in Belo Horizonte, Brazil

Baba de camelo (literally camel slobber) is a typical Portuguese dessert made with condensed milk and eggs with almond or cookie toppings.

Popular urban myth tells the early 20th century story of a lady who had unexpected visitors in the house, but lacked ingredients, so she invented a mousse with the ingredients she had in her kitchen and the choice of the particular name was simply to attract the attention of the guests or to abstain them from tasting it.
