= Pastel de feijão =

Portuguese bean tart

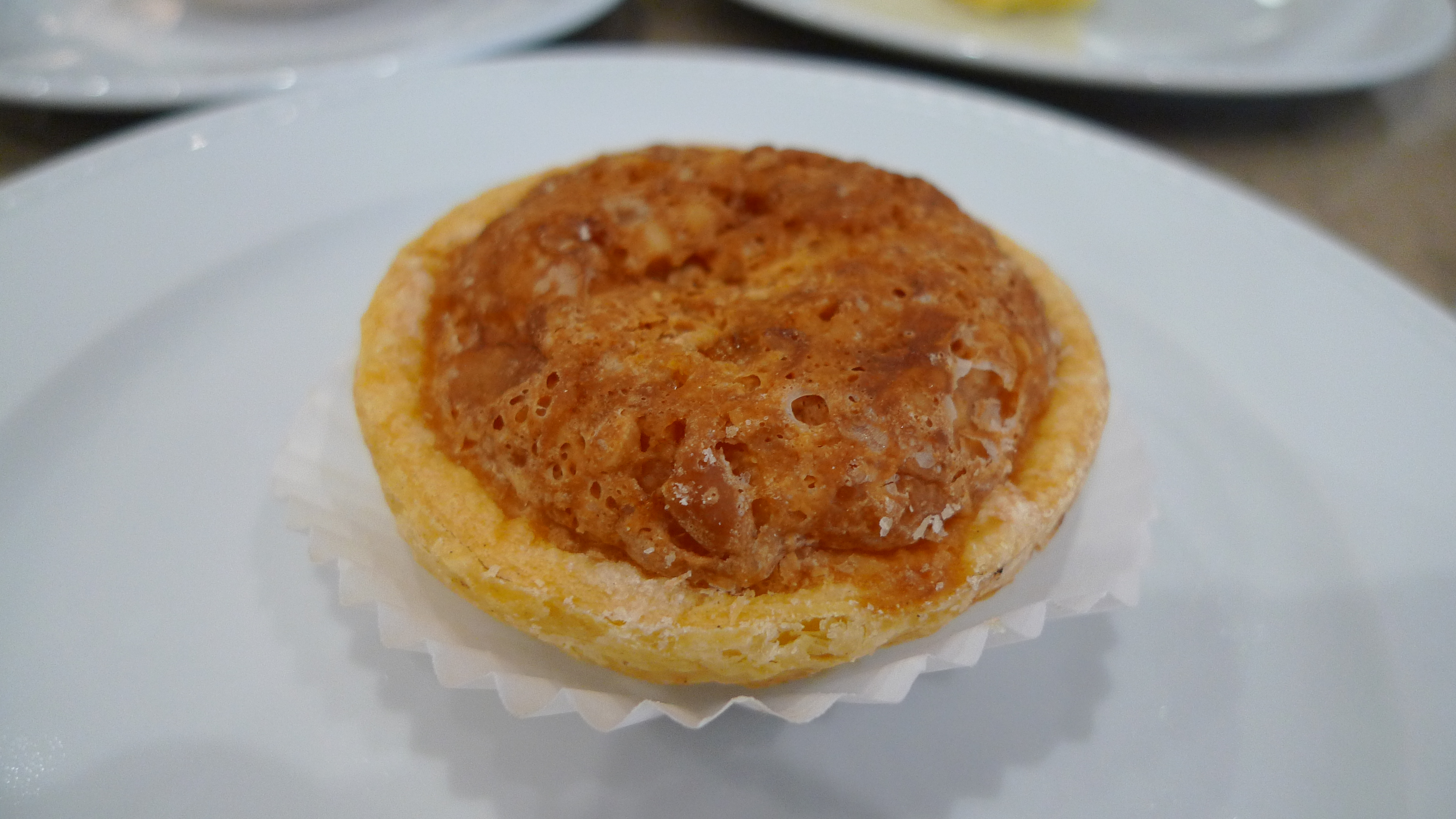
- Pastel de feijão served in a café in Guimarães
- Course: Dessert
- Place of origin: Portugal
- Region or state: Torres Vedras

Pastel de feijão (plural: pastéis de feijão) is a Portuguese crispy dough pastry, filled with a navy bean jam. They were first introduced in the town of Torres Vedras in the early 20th century though its origin may date earlier as it was originally produced by nuns. It was one of the 38 "characteristic sweets of localities" selected to appear in the Exposição Etnografica Portuguesa in 1896.

== Description ==
The pastries consist of a dough and enough water to knead, spread very thin and filled with a jam made from beans, sugar, eggs and almonds. They are individually wrapped in cellophane and placed in cardboard boxes, containing 6 cakes. They are also sold by the unit in pastry shops. They are about 7 cm (2.8 in) in diameter.

== In Brazil ==
In Brazil there is a variation of the pastel de feijão, which is salty and filled with black beans, suitable for feijoada, and is very popular in the city of Rio de Janeiro, especially in the neighborhood of Santa Tereza.

Besides the feijoada pastel, there are also variations such as the pastel with tropeiro bean filling.
