= Galão =

Drink made with coffee and milk

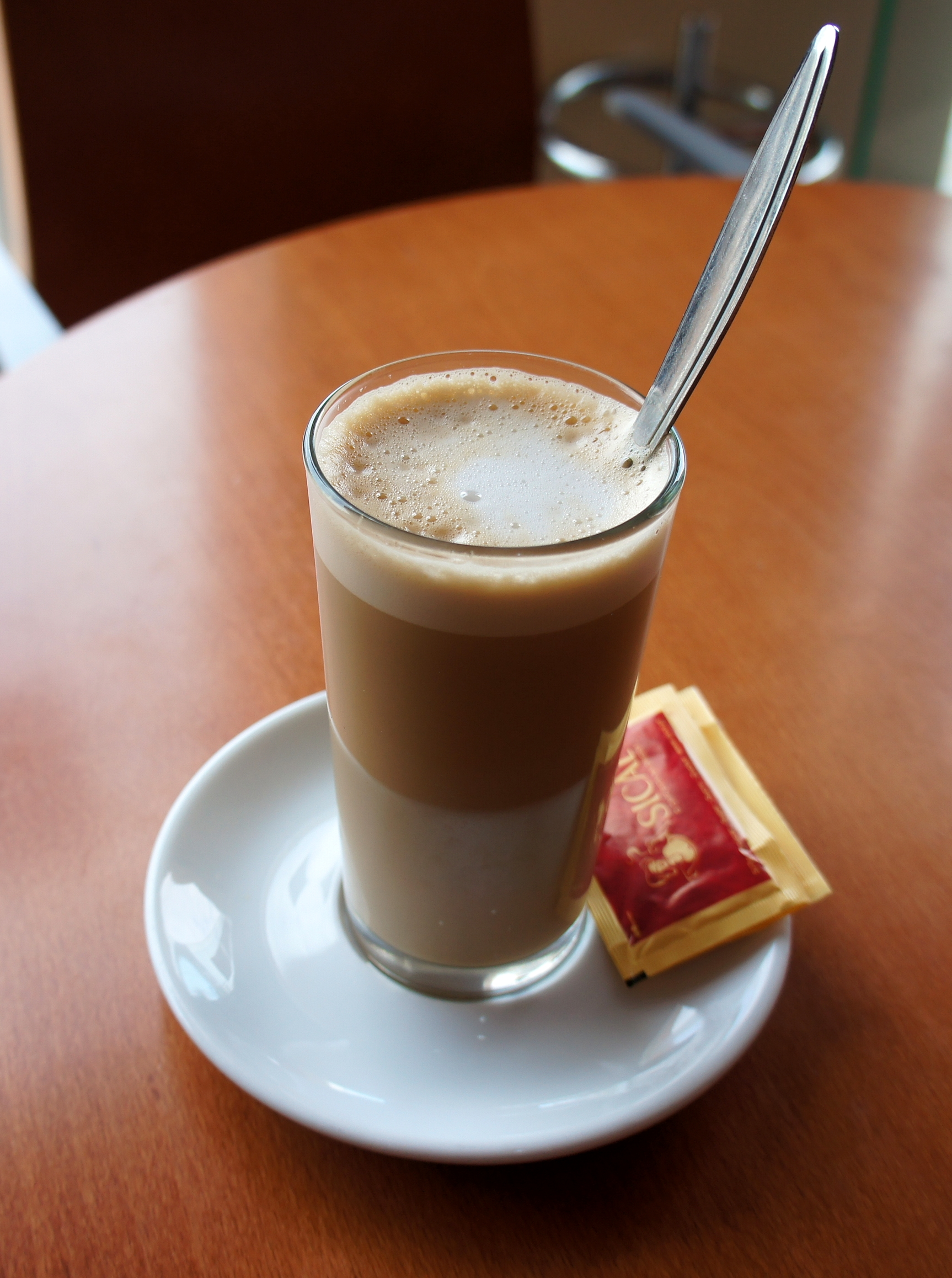
- Galão from Madeira, Portugal
- Type: Hot
- Country of origin: Portugal
- Color: Light brown

Galão (Portuguese pronunciation: [ɡɐˈlɐ̃w]) is a hot drink from Portugal made by adding foamed milk to espresso coffee. Similar to caffè latte or café au lait, it consists of about one quarter coffee and three quarters foamed milk. It is served in a tall glass, as opposed to the smaller garoto that is served in a demitasse. When the proportion is 1:1 it is called meia de leite (half milk) and is served in a cup.

== See also ==
- List of coffee beverages
