= Meia-desfeita =

Portuguese cod and chickpea dish

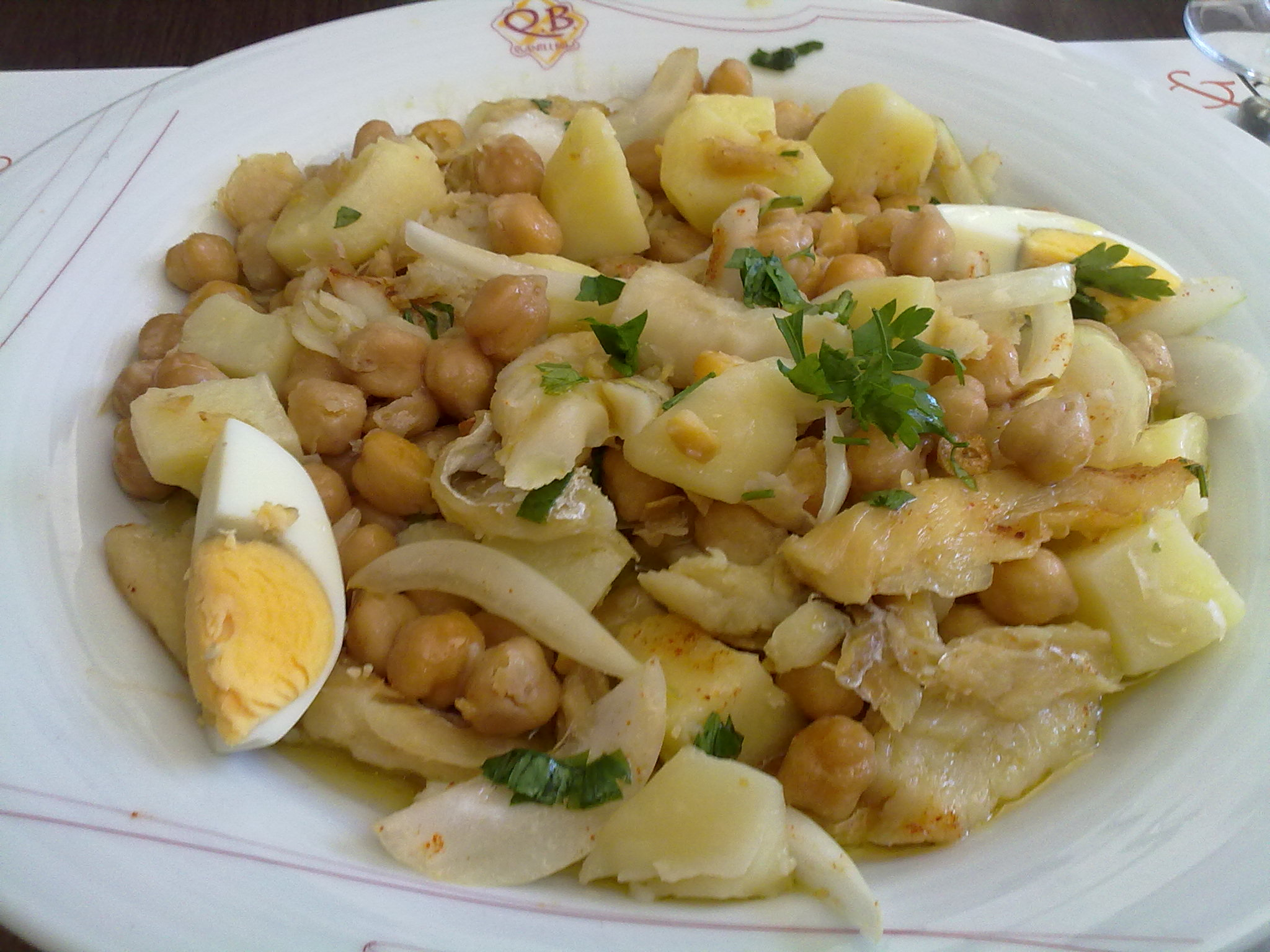
A meia-desfeita, 2010

Meia-desfeita is a Portuguese dish, typically from Lisbon. It consists of cod (Bacalhau), cooked with chickpeas. It can be seasoned with onions and garlic sautéed in olive oil, parsley, paprika and vinegar, among other possible spices, and may or may not be finished in the oven.

It can also be complemented with hard-boiled eggs and boiled potatoes.

The cod should be presented without bones and it should be broken into fillets.

== See also ==
- Portuguese cuisine
- Bacalhau
