= Espada com banana =

Portuguese dish

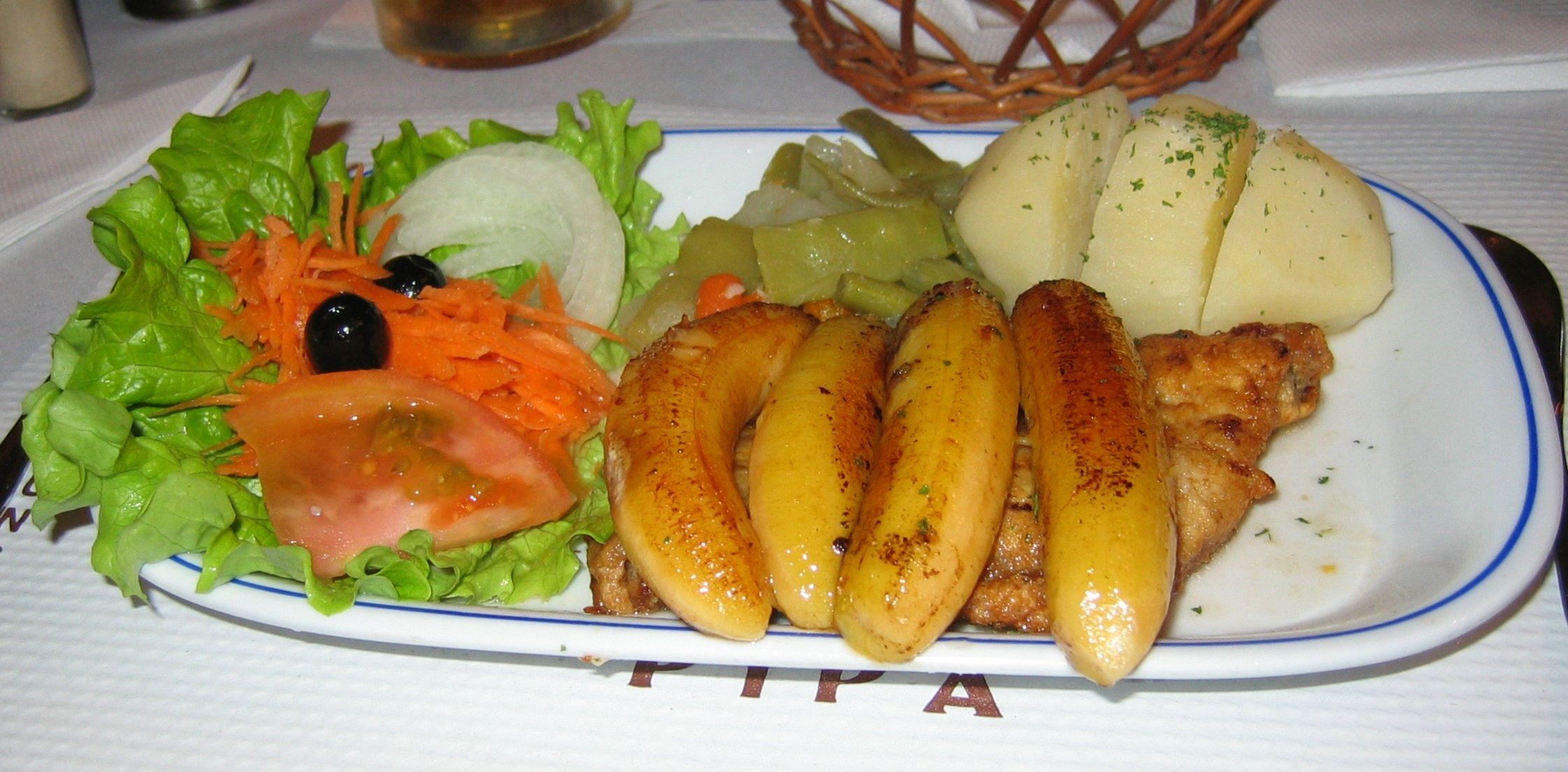
Espada com banana

Espada com banana is a traditional dish from the Madeira archipelago. As the name suggests, it is prepared with black scabbardfish (espada) and banana. The black scabbardfish is cut into fillets and seasoned with lemon, salt, pepper, and garlic. It is then fried in hot oil, coated in batter or breaded. The bananas are fried open in half, and it is common for them to be fried in the same pan as the fish, even in the same oil. It can be served with sautéed boiled potatoes and salad or spinach puree.
