= Sopa do Espírito Santo =

Portuguese soup

Sopas Do Espírito Santo is a dish of the Azores region of Portugal made especially for the Pentecost feast. The soup contains cabbage, sausage, bacon, beef, wine and spices.
