= Torta de Azeitão =

Portuguese sponge cake roll

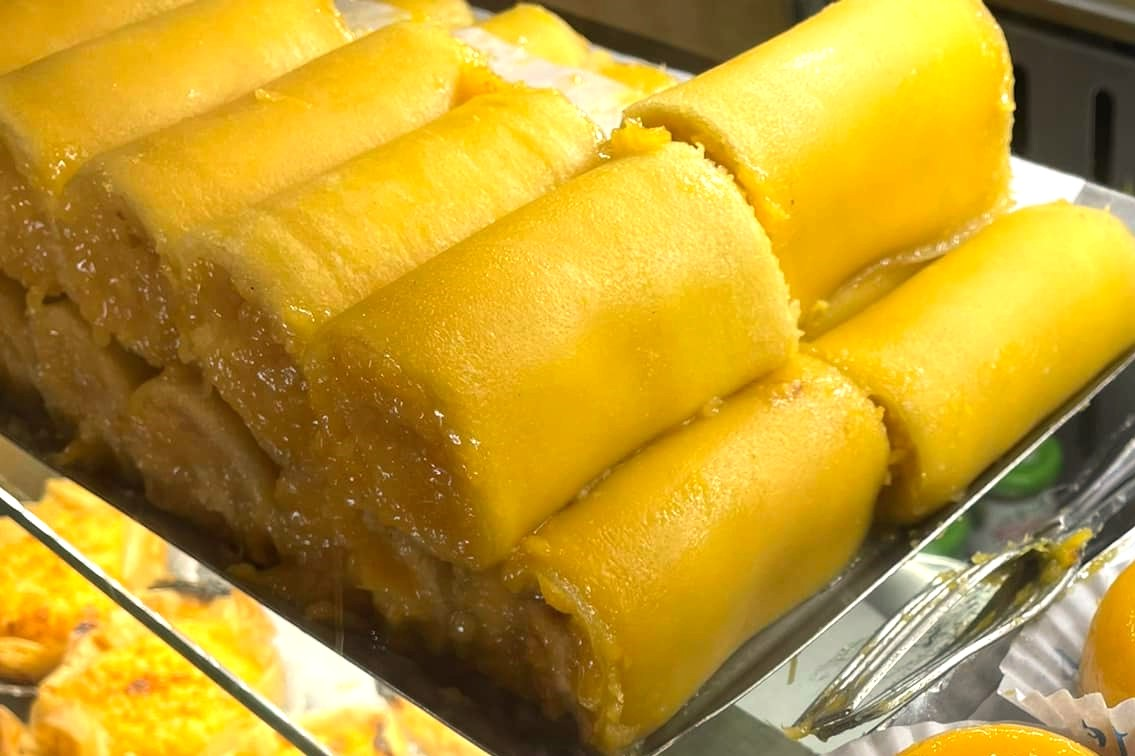
- Tortas de Azeitão
- Alternative names: Tortas de Azeitão (plural)
- Type: Roll cake Conventual sweet
- Course: Dessert
- Place of origin: Portugal
- Region or state: Azeitão, Setúbal
- Created by: Manuel Rodrigues; Maria Albina
- Main ingredients: Sponge cake (Maize flour, eggs, almonds, sugar), doces de ovos (egg yolks, sugar, water)
- Ingredients generally used: Cinnamon
- Variations: Gianduja (chocolate, hazelnuts)
- Similar dishes: Torta de Aveiro, Torta de Viana, Torta de doce de ovos, Pampilho, Pastéis de Vouzela, Pastel de Tentúgal

Torta de Azeitão is a Portuguese roll cake filled with doces de ovos from the parish of Azeitão.

== History ==
The cakes are believed to have originated in Fronteira, Alentejo in the late 1800s. The recipe was purchased by Manuel Rodrigues from the pastelaria "O Cego" (lit. 'The Blind') which was established in 1901 in Azeitão. Rodrigues, the namesake of the pastry shop as he was blind, gave the recipe to his wife Maria Albina who was an accomplished confectioner. The cakes were originally made as a large cake that was sliced into individual servings. But eventually, the cakes were made into smaller individual cakes seen today.

José Augusto Pinto is the current owner of the O Cego, who started baking at the age of fifteen. The pastelaria was purchased by his father Augusto Pinto from Rodrigues in 1975. Pinto continues to recreate the original Torta de Azeitão recipe and other recipes created by Maria Albina. While O Cego remains the origin of the Tortas de Azeitão, other pastelarias in Azeitão offer the pastry as well. Another shop offers the pastry in other filling flavors, such as gianduia.

Although not considered a conventual sweet, it shares many of its egg-rich characteristics. Notably, the sponge cake is made with maize flour instead of wheat flour. A similar roll cake made of wheat flour and filled with doces de ovos is found in Viana do Castelo known as torta de Viana is classified as a conventual sweet.

== See also ==
- Portuguese Cuisine
- Pão de Ló
