= Liquorice stick (cocktail) =

Licorice stick
- A Licorice stick or Regaliz served in a short tumbler.
- Type: Highball
- Ingredients: 120 mL Cola; 50 mL Anisette or; 50 mL Absinthe
- Standard drinkware: Highball glass
- Standard garnish: long piece of black licorice.
- Served: On the rocks: poured over ice
- Preparation: Build all ingredients in a highball glass filled with ice. Garnish with a piece of black licorice.

Liquorice Stick (/ˈlɪkɒrɪstɪk/) or alternatively spelled Licorice Stick, also known as a "Regaliz", is a highball (cocktail) made of cola, anisette or absinthe, and Liquorice sticks as a garnish. It originated in Terceira Island, Azores, Portugal where it was called a "pauzinho de alcaçuz" as an alternative to the rum and cola drink called a "cuba libre". In Spain it is called a "palito de orozuz". It was introduced into the U.S. through the Portuguese communities in Massachusetts and Rhode Island.

== Recipe variations ==
Licorice stick cocktails can be mixed with just about any anise flavored liqueur.

== Local variations ==
- In Portugal, where the drink originates, it is often mixed with "anisette" but an older method considered more authentic is to make the drink using "absinthe" then cola is poured in over a sugar cube and ice
- In Spain there is another variation, made with Anis del Mono and cola
- In Greece Thessaloniki, there is another variant, that consists of "ouzo" and cola
- In the Italy the drink is usually served with "sambuca" instead of anisette and mixed with cola
