= Aletria =

Portuguese dessert

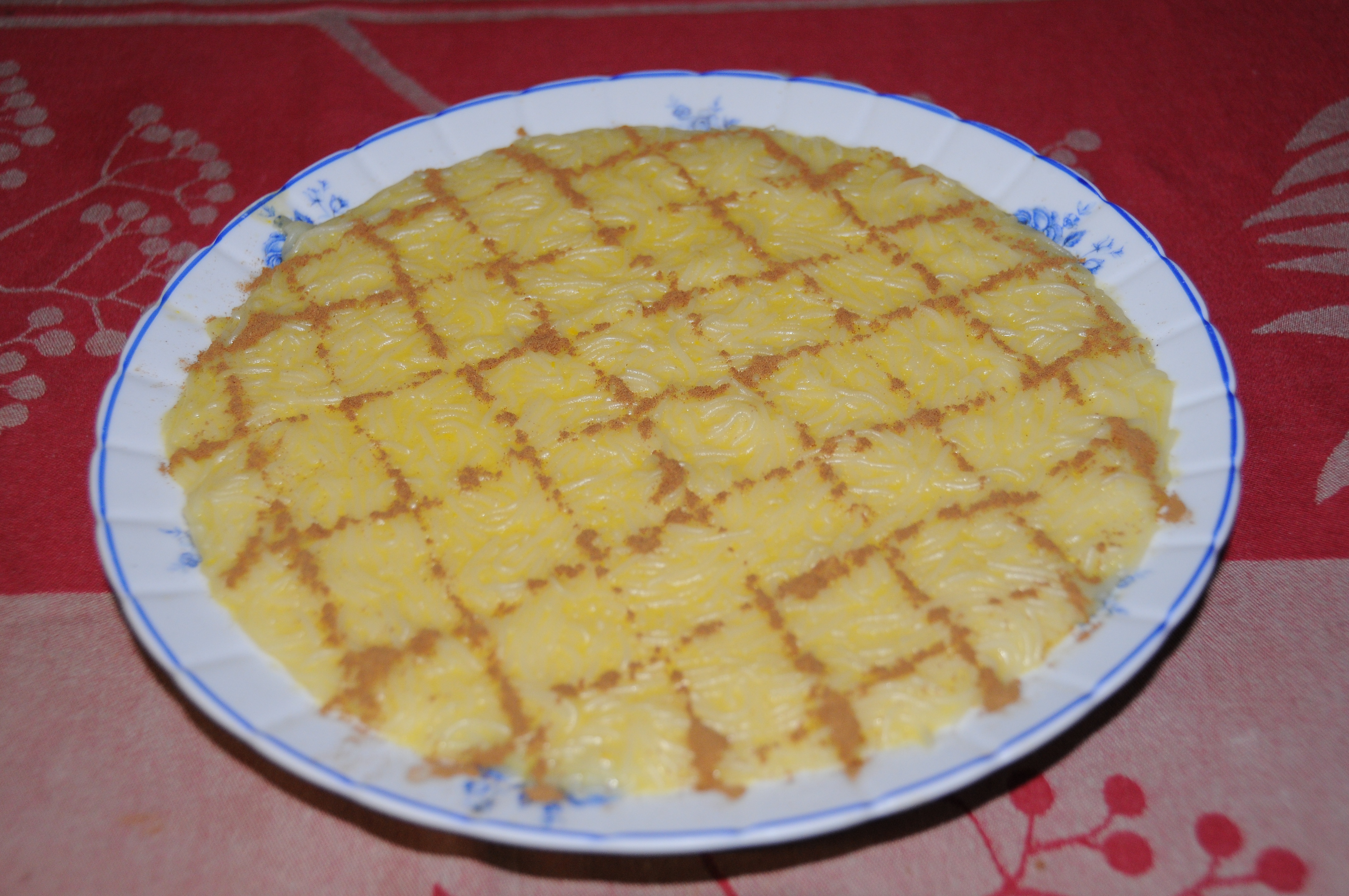
Aletria

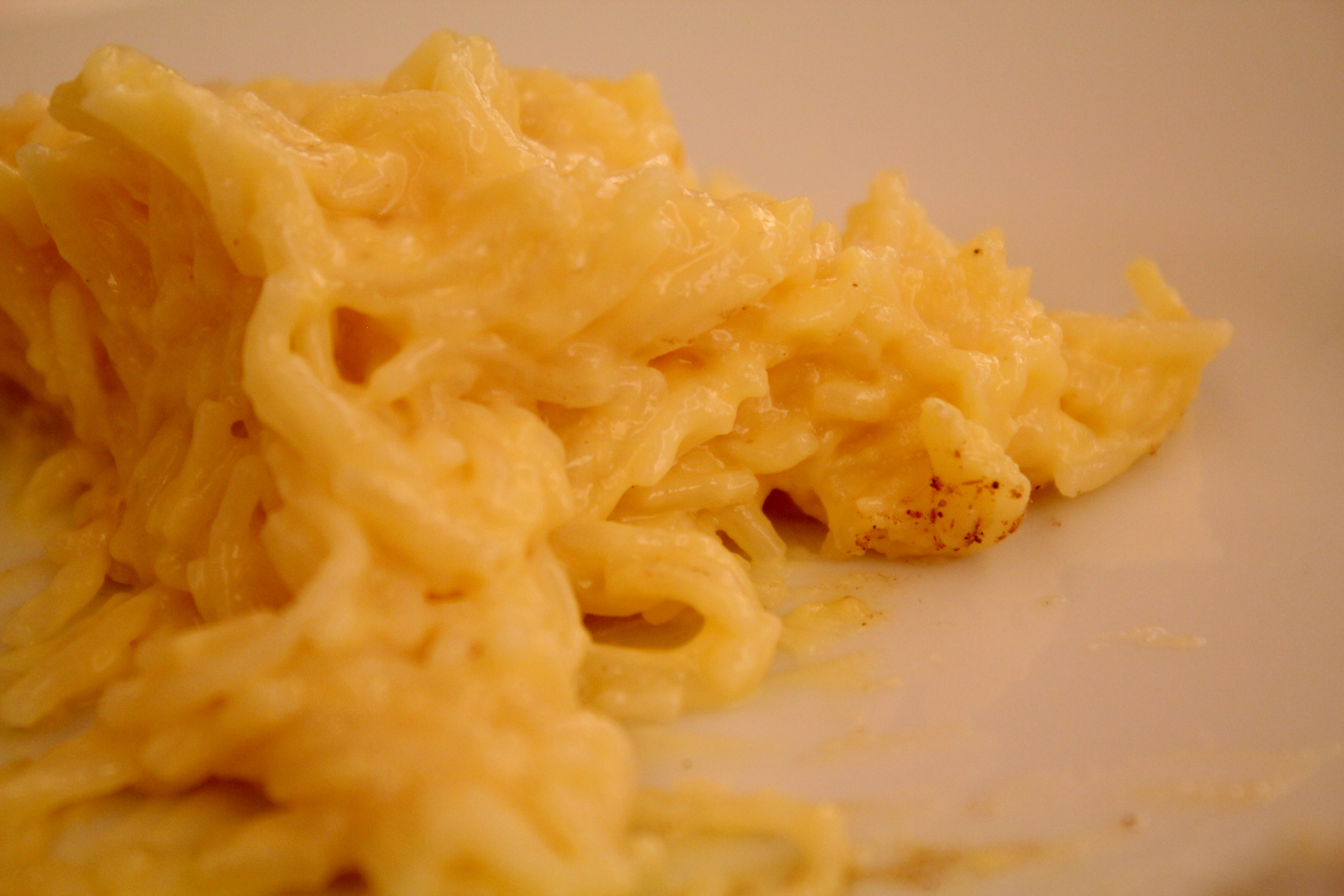
Aletria with a creamy consistency

Aletria is a custardy Portuguese dessert based on vermicelli (aletria). In the Beiras region, aletria has a compact consistency, and is able to be cut in slices, whereas in Minho its consistency is more creamy.

== Origin ==
Llibre de Sent Soví, a set of two 14th-century manuscripts, in Catalan, contains a compilation of 200 recipes, of which there are two with alatria (170: Qui parla con se cou alatria or "how to cook vermicelli" and 171 : Qui parla con se cou carn ab alatria or "how to cook meat with vermicelli"). However, what they called vermicelli should have a very different shape from the current thin strands of dough.

Vermicelli was probably brought to the Iberian Peninsula by the Moors in the 8th or 9th century. It remained in Portugal and incorporated into Portuguese cuisine, and began to designate the mass of very fine yarns, with which a typical Christmas candy, present in almost all regions of the country, is prepared. The name aletria itself has disappeared in Spain, remaining only in the region of the ancient Kingdom of Murcia. It is however noteworthy that Catalan cuisine has enriched itself a lot with products promoted by the Arabs, including vermicelli.
