= Rojões =

Portuguese pork stew

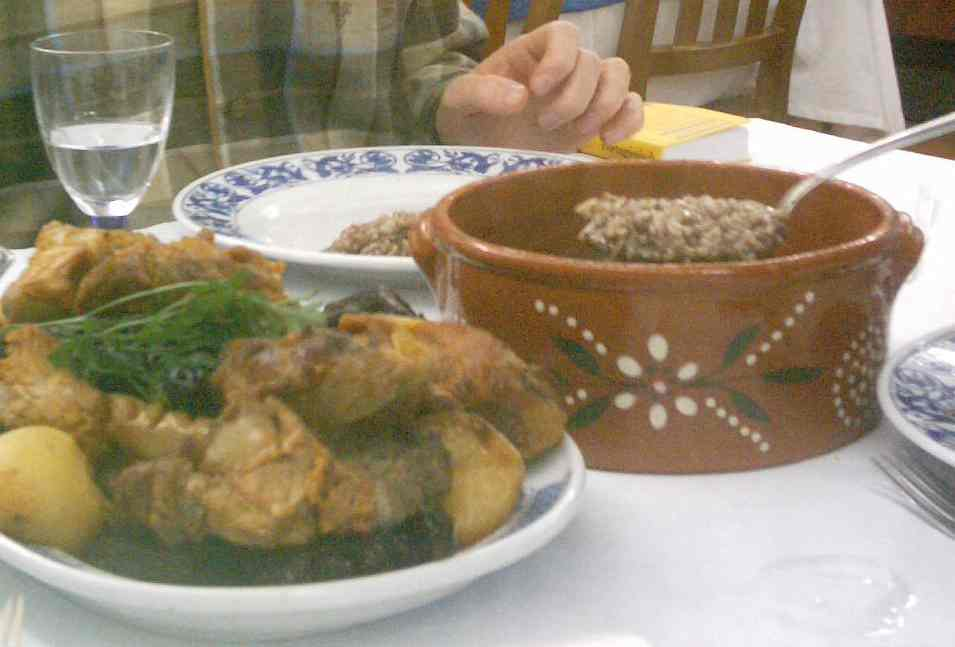
Rojões à moda do Minho, 2003

Rojões also known as rojões à moda do Minho is a typical fried pork dish of Portuguese cuisine, in particular, of the Minho Province in the wider Norte region of northern Portugal but with several regional variants across the country. Rojões is also the name for boneless pieces of pork meat, but with some fat (for example, from the leg). In the North of Portugal, rojões are pork cuts from the leg, shoulder or belly, fried in lard in a pan, preferably made of iron, which is a typical regional dish well-known across the entire country and easily found also in almost all parts of Portugal. There are variants like those from Bairrada (rojões da Bairrada), Porto (rojões à moda do Porto) and Minho Province (rojões à minhota or rojões à moda do Minho). The nationally-famous carne de porco à alentejana, which always has clams as an ingredient and is named after the region of Alentejo, is indeed a dish of rojões with clams, also called rojões [de porco] à Alentejana, with or without clams.
