= Doce de ovos =

Portuguese confection

Doce de ovos is a sweet egg cream from Portuguese cuisine made with egg yolks and simple syrup. It is used as a filling for layered sponge cakes, and can be used as a sweet topping for ice creams and other desserts like Natas do Céu. The cream must be prepared at low temperature or in a bain marie to prevent the egg yolks coagulating.

It is a common component of products offered in Portuguese doçaria confectionery stores.

== See also ==
- Fios de ovos
- Ovos moles
