= Uzun erişte =

Turkish pasta

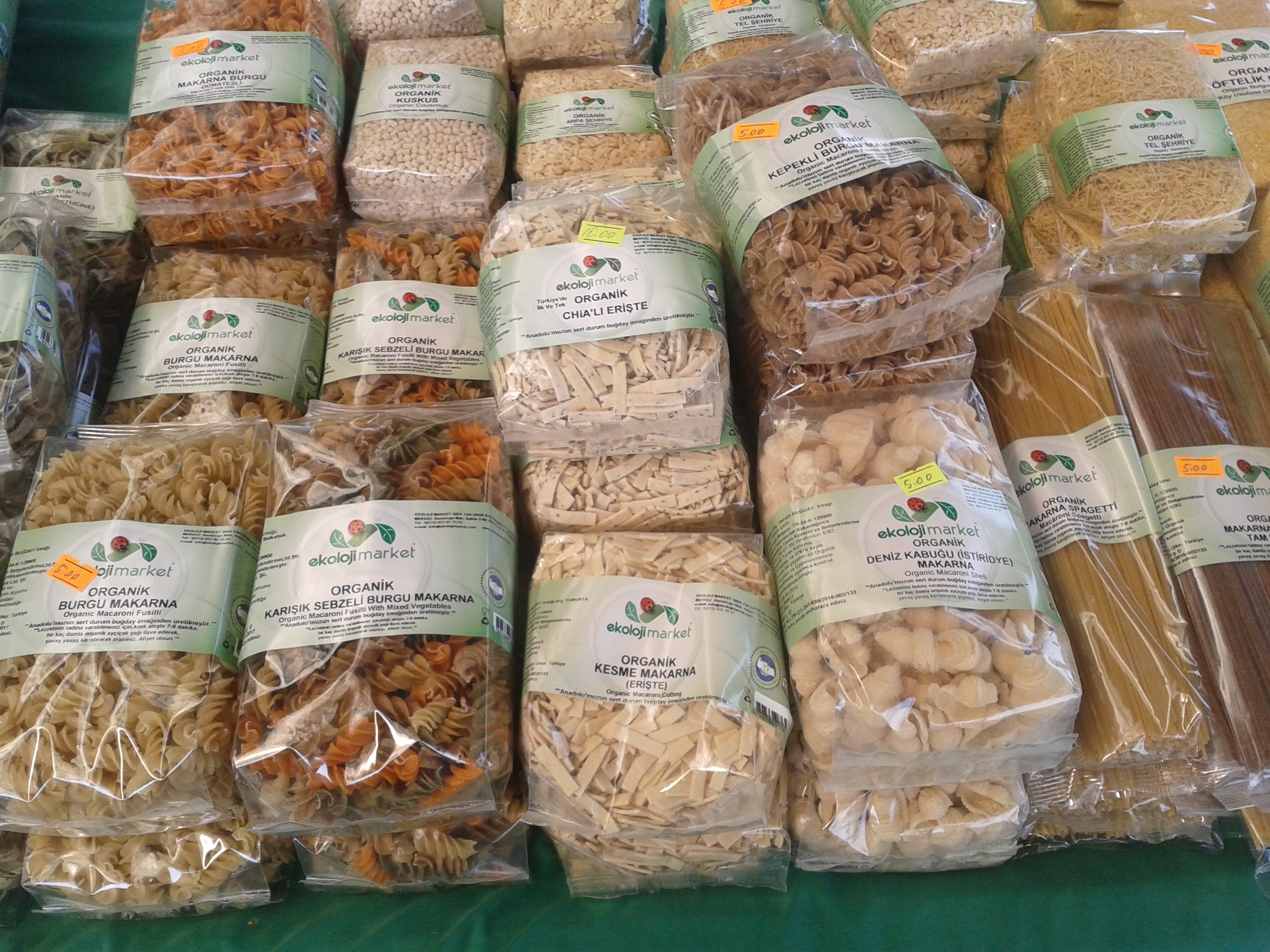
- Type: Pasta
- Place of origin: Turkey
- Main ingredients: Hard wheat flour, eggs, milk, salt
- Variations: Kesme, çorbalık kesme

Uzun erişte is a traditional Turkish pasta made from flour, eggs, milk and salt. It is prepared by adding eggs, such as kesme, but its size is longer.

== See also ==
- Kesme
- Çorbalık kesme
