= Cimcik erişte =

Turkish pasta

- Type: Pasta
- Place of origin: Turkey
- Main ingredients: Hard wheat flour, eggs, salt
- Variations: Kesme, çorbalık kesme

Cimcik erişte or cimcik makarna are a traditional Turkish pasta made from flour, eggs and salt. They resemble a butterfly and are similar to farfalle. Cimcik erişte are referred to as "kesme" in modern standard Turkish.

The name cimcik erişte is a nominalization meaning to cut, and refers to either the formation of the noodle itself or the meal they are traditionally used in.

== See also ==
- Çorbalık kesme
