= Şehriye =

Pasta used in soups and pilafs in Turkish cuisine

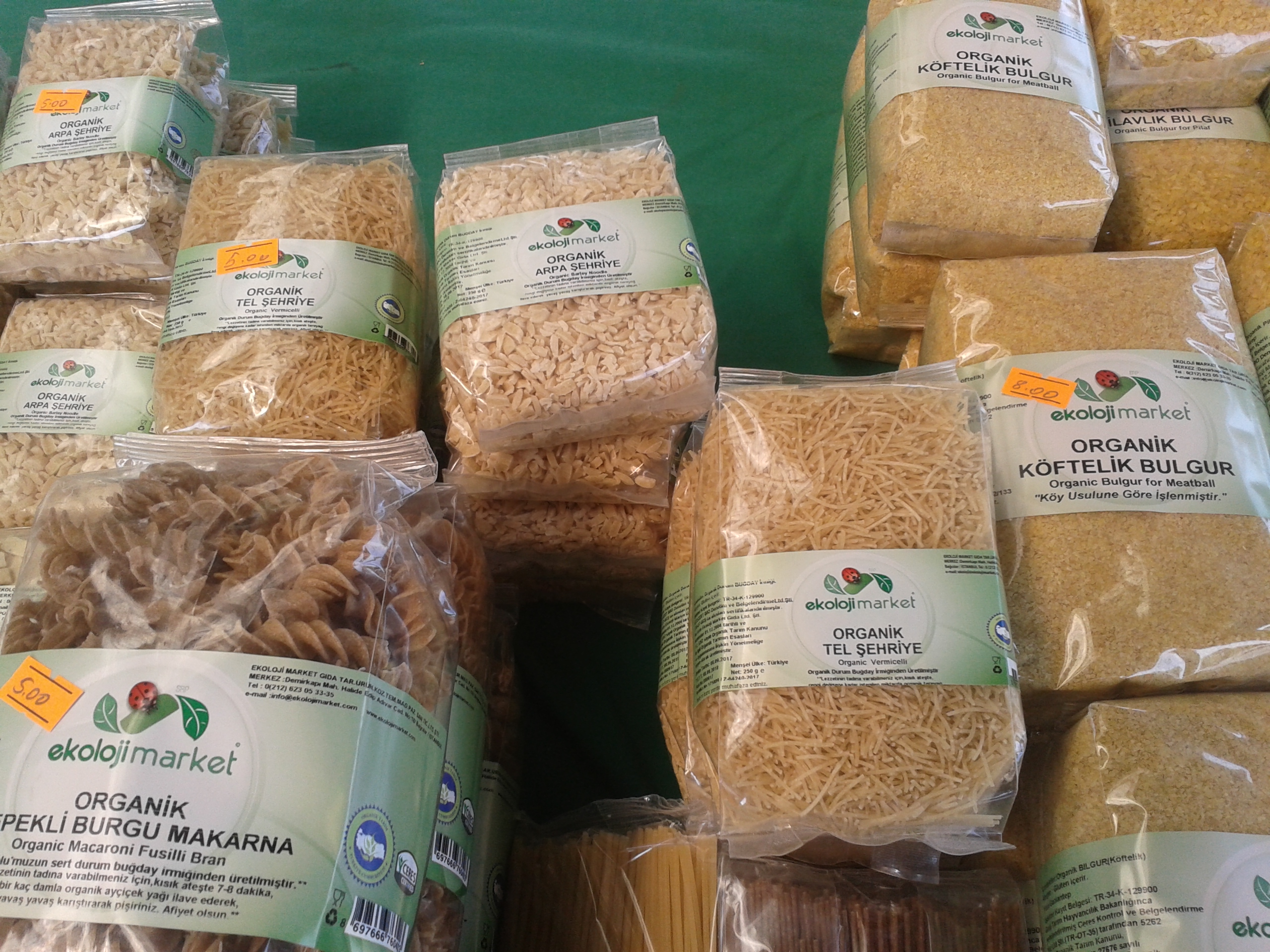
- Type: Pasta
- Place of origin: Turkey
- Associated cuisine: Turkish cuisine
- Main ingredients: hard wheat flour, eggs, milk, salt
- Variations: kesme, çorbalık kesme

Şehriye is a variety of pasta or kesme consisting of tiny pieces of pasta, typically of a round (irregular) shape with a diameter of about one-sixteenth of an inch. It is the smallest type of pasta produced. It is made of wheat flour and may also include egg.

Şehriye is used in many different ways in Turkish cuisine, including as an ingredient of soup, desserts, infant food and also, alone, as a distinct and unique pasta dish.
