= Arabic rice =

Preparation of rice in the Middle East

Rice with vermicelli (ٱلْأَرُزُّ بِٱلشُّعَيْرِيَّةِ)
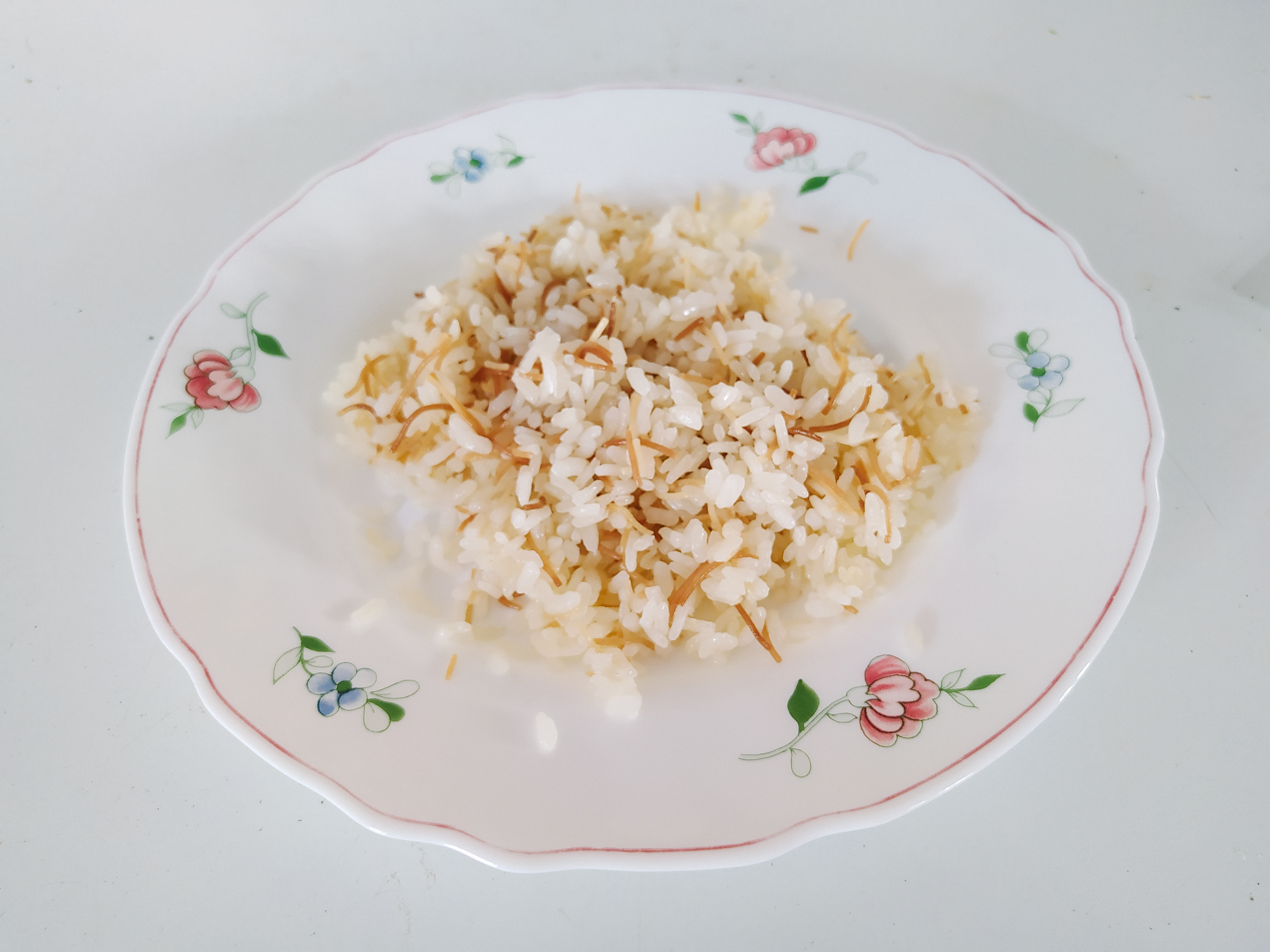
- Alternative names: Egyptian rice with vermicelli
- Type: staple dish
- Associated cuisine: Arabic cuisine
- Main ingredients: rice and vermicelli
- Ingredients generally used: clarified butter or olive oil, salt, water

Arabic rice or rice with vermicelli (Arabic: ٱلْأَرُزُّ بِٱلشُّعَيْرِيَّةِ, romanized: Al-Aruzz bi-sh-shu'ayriyya) is a traditional preparation of rice in the Middle East, a variant of the simpler cooked rice recipe, but adding lightly toasted vermicelli (tiny noodles). The rice cooking method is known as pilaf, by which the rice is fluffy, light and does not stick. Traditionally, a long-grain rice, such as basmati or jasmine, is used, although short-grain rice, such as bomba or Misri ("Egyptian"), can be used too. Brown rice can also be used.

The vermicelli used is the finest variety of noodles, called şehriye in Turkey, or shariyah (شعرية) in Arab countries, pastina or cappellini in Italy, and cabello de angel in Spain. They are a finer variety than spaghetti. As a fat agent, clarified butter is usually used, called in Arabic samneh (سمنة), better known internationally as ghee. Failing that, ordinary butter or olive oil can be used. A multitude of ingredients of all kinds can be added to the basic recipe, depending on each region, and even on each home: raisins and pine nuts, garlic or onion, almonds, etc.

Arab immigration to the Americas brought this way of making rice to this area, where today it is common in some regions, especially during Christmas. In Hispanic America, the arroz árabe or arroz con fideos is popular in the traditional cuisine of Colombia, Dominican Republic, the Peru, and Chile. Vermicelli rice is also popular in Afghan cuisine.

== Terminology and distribution ==
Couscous prevails in the Maghreb (west), while rice is in the Mashreq (east)

In the Arab world there is no specific way to name this way of preparing rice, as it is the basic way of preparing rice. In Egyptian Arabic: Rozz be el shyeriyah, and in Lebanese Arabic: Rizz bi-sh-shʿayriyyeh, more specifically rice with vermicelli, is a staple that accompanies most meals in the Middle East. This does not apply to the Maghreb where the staple carbohydrate is couscous.

It is also very typical in Turkish cuisine, where it is known as şehriyeli pilavı. Internationally, it can be found in some sources such as "Lebanese rice" or "Egyptian style rice". Essentially, all names refer to the same preparation.

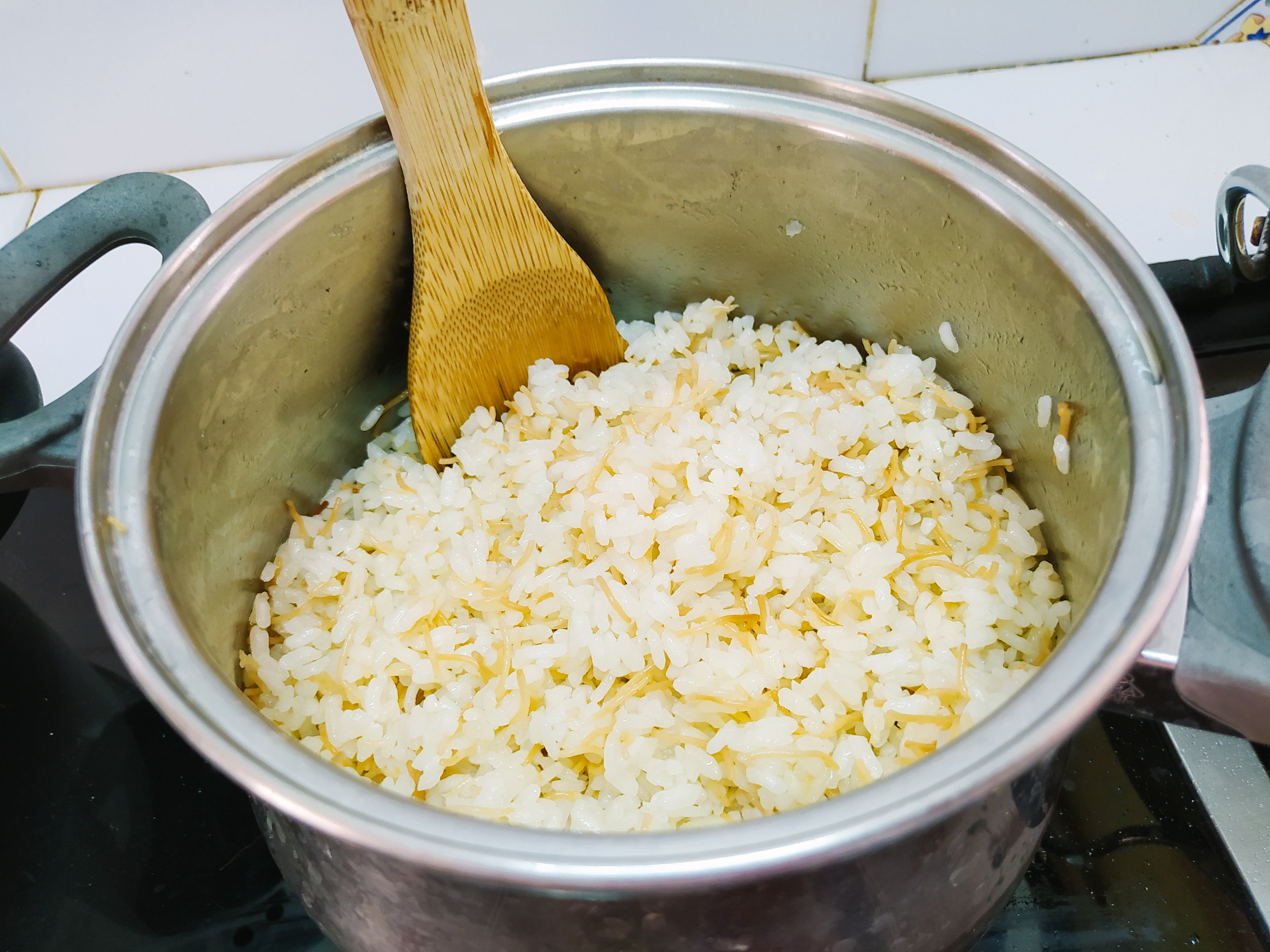
Lebanese-style vermicelli rice

== See also ==
- Middle Eastern cuisine
- Levantine cuisine
- Rice-A-Roni, mass-produced version of the dish popular in North America
- Biryani, rice dish with lamb, eggs and dahi (curd).
- Kabsa, Arabic dish of rice, spices, vegetables and chicken.
- Kousa mahshi, Arabic dish of courgettes stuffed with rice.
- Mandi, Arabic dish of rice, lamb and Hawaij spices.
- Mansaf, Arabic dish of rice, jameed and lamb.
- Maqluba, Arabic dish of rice, meat and vegetables.
- Mujaddara, Arabic dish of lentils, rice and onion.
- Quzi, Arabic dish of rice with lamb.
- Yabrak, Arabic dish of vine leaf stuffed with rice
