= Azevia =

Portuguese fried pastry with various fillings

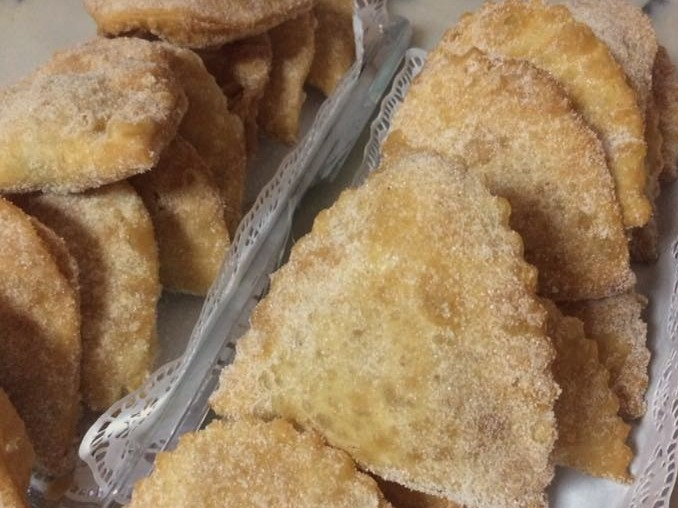
- Azevias
- Alternative names: Farto
- Type: Pastel; Conventual sweet
- Course: Dessert
- Place of origin: Portugal
- Region or state: Évora, Alentejo
- Main ingredients: Pastry (flour, eggs, lard, olive oil, water, salt), sugar
- Ingredients generally used: Cinnamon, orange juice, almonds
- Variations: Grão (chickpea); Batata doce (sweet potato); Gila (chilacayote); Feijão (navy bean)

Azevias (singular: azevia) are traditional Portuguese fried pastries, turnovers filled with a sweet filling.

Because of their thin profile compared to similar fried turnovers, they were named after a type of sole, a flatfish found in Portuguese waters. Recipes for azevias were first recorded in the refectory notebooks and cookbooks of the Poor Clare nuns of the Convent of Santa Clara in Évora.

The dough is similar to a hot water crust, containing lard and warm water. Orange juice is sometimes added or used in place of water. The most common filling flavors are made with chickpeas, sweet potatoes, chilacayote jam, or navy beans. It is often mixed with egg yolks and ground almonds, typical ingredients characteristic of many Portuguese desserts, especially conventual sweets. After frying, they are coated with sugar and cinnamon.

Although azevias are made throughout the year, they are particularly popular during the Christmas season and during the pre-Lent Carnaval period. During Carnaval, cotton is sometimes used as a filling as a prank.

== See also ==
- Pastel
- Pasteles
- Pastel (Brazilian)
- Pastel (Portuguese)
- Portuguese Cuisine
