= Pão de rala =

Portuguese-style conventual sweet

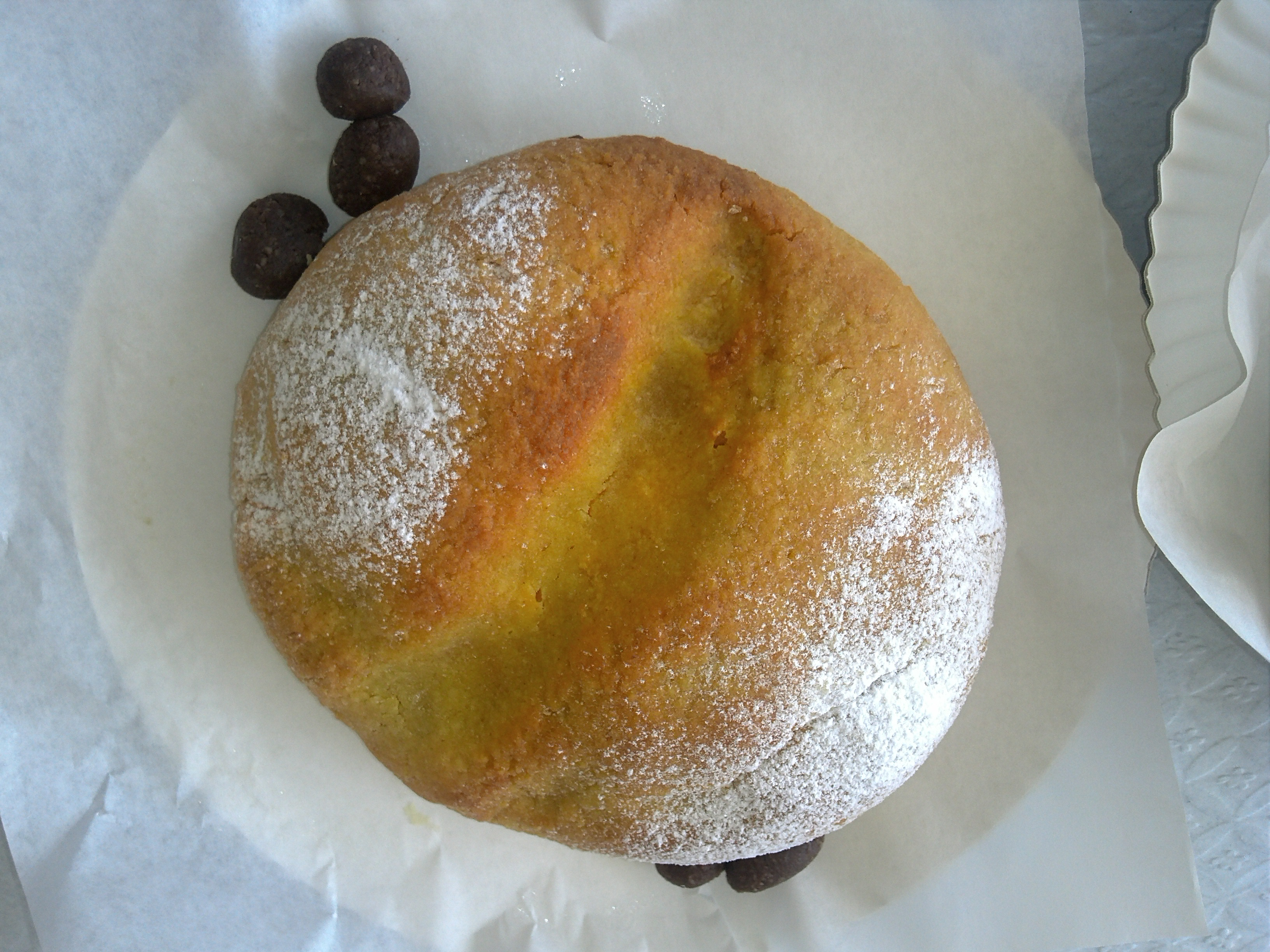
- Accompanied with marzipan "olives" and cocoa.
- Type: Conventual dessert
- Place of origin: Portugal
- Region or state: Évora, Alentejo
- Main ingredients: Almond, sugar, egg yolks, doce de gila
- Ingredients generally used: Lemon or orange zest, cocoa powder

Pão de Rala (lit. 'breadcrumbs') is an historical conventual dessert created by the Poor Clare nuns in the Convento de Santa Helena do Calvário in Évora. It is often accompanied by olives shaped out of marzipan and dusted with cocoa, per legend.

Pão de Rala is essentially a flourless pastry made to resemble bread. It is made with an almond-based dough similar to marzipan, enriched with egg yolks wrapped around a sweet filling consisting of sugar, fios de ovos (sweet egg yolk threads), and doce de gila (chilacayote jam). Flour is used to assist in shaping the pastry. It was created in commemoration of the visit of King Sebastian to the area.

== Gallery ==
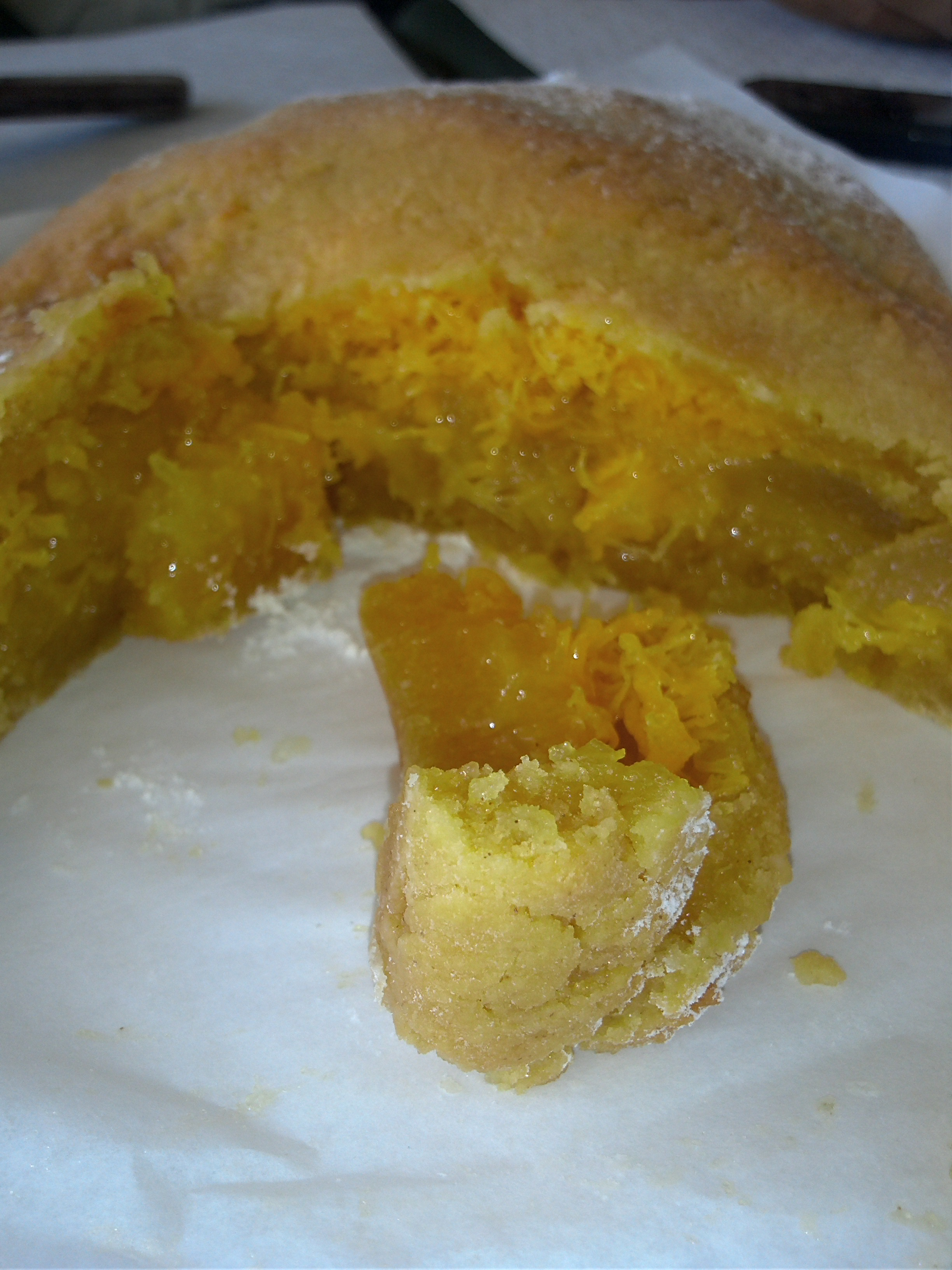
Opened showing the fios de ovos (sweetened egg yolk threads)

== See also ==
- Portuguese Cuisine – Culinary traditions of Portugal
- Portuguese sweet bread – Various Portuguese sweet breads
