= Marrybrown =

Malaysia-based fast food chain

Marrybrown Sdn Bhd
- Type: Private
- Industry: Fast food restaurant
- Founded: 1981; 45 years ago in Johor Bahru, Johor, Malaysia
- Founders: Dato Lawrence Liew; Datin Nancy Liew
- Headquarters: Dewani Industrial Park, Johor Bahru, Johor
- Area served: Asia; Oceania; Africa; Middle East; Europe
- Website: www.marrybrown.com

Marrybrown Sdn Bhd is a Malaysian multinational chain of quick service restaurants based in Johor Bahru, Johor. Being one of the largest global halal fast food-establishments, the chain has since expanded to over 250 locations throughout Malaysia and across several countries. The restaurant focuses on Malaysian and western dishes.

== History ==
=== Early beginnings ===
Marrybrown was founded in 1981 by Lawrence Liew and Nancy Liew in Johor Bahru, Johor, Malaysia. As the banks were reluctant to provide the pair with a personal loan, the couple raised RM120,000.00 via their personal joint savings as well as by borrowing funds from their relatives and close friends. The couple faced many challengers and obstacles to open their first outlet — as many of the shop owners were reluctant to lease their premise, while suppliers were only willing to provide their goods on a cash delivery basis.

The first restaurant was opened in 1981 in a small shop lot in Jalan Wong Ah Fook, Johor Bahru.

=== Domestic and international growth ===
After Marrybrown moved into franchising model in 1985, the chain began to experience rapid growth; currently, its franchise outlets form a majority of its operation. After tapping the Malaysian market, the restaurant operated its first overseas Outlet in China in 1996. The company's local and abroad expansions were assisted by its halal-friendly approach as well as its incorporation of Malaysian menu, which were both managed to appeal many international consumers.

The international presence of Marrybrown franchises, including both countries where it has operated in the past and currently operates, is as follows:

- Malaysia – 1981
- Singapore – 1990, 1995
- Brunei - 1990, 2014
- China – 1996
- India – 1999
- Sri Lanka – 1999
- Bahrain – 2000
- Kuwait – 2000
- Qatar – 2000
- Saudi Arabia – 2000
- United Arab Emirates – 2000
- Syria – 2005
- Tanzania – 2008
- Azerbaijan – 2009
- Maldives – 2011
- Indonesia - 2012
- Myanmar – 2013
- Thailand – 2015
- Sweden – 2020
- Australia – 2023

== Menu and concept ==
To differentiate from the other early quick service restaurant in Malaysia that largely based on the American-menu (such as fried chicken and burgers), the restaurant began to introduced and combined Malaysian flavours to complement the western meals offered in the restaurant. It was the first Malaysian fast-food restaurant that included rice with the introduction of Nasi Marrybrown in 1986, followed by Nasi Lemak in 1989, Chicken Porridge in 1990 and Curry Noodles in 2006. MarryBrown's menu also features Chicken rice, Bubur pedas, Nasi Kandar, fried bread, fish and chips, cheesy potato wedges, mashed potatoes and other beverages.

In addition to the Malaysian and western cuisines, the chain would also introduced regionalised meals in its international locations. In the Indian Ocean nation of Maldives, the Marrybrown outlets in the country would include Tuna Burger and Curry Tuna Biryani; in India, 30% of its items would be tailored in accordance to the localised vegetarian selections. In UAE, wrap, pasta and spicy rice included in the menu; while churros and mozzarella sticks are served in Marrybrown's Swedish outlet; and in its Tanzanian branch, wrap and veggie burger meals are available.

== Gallery ==
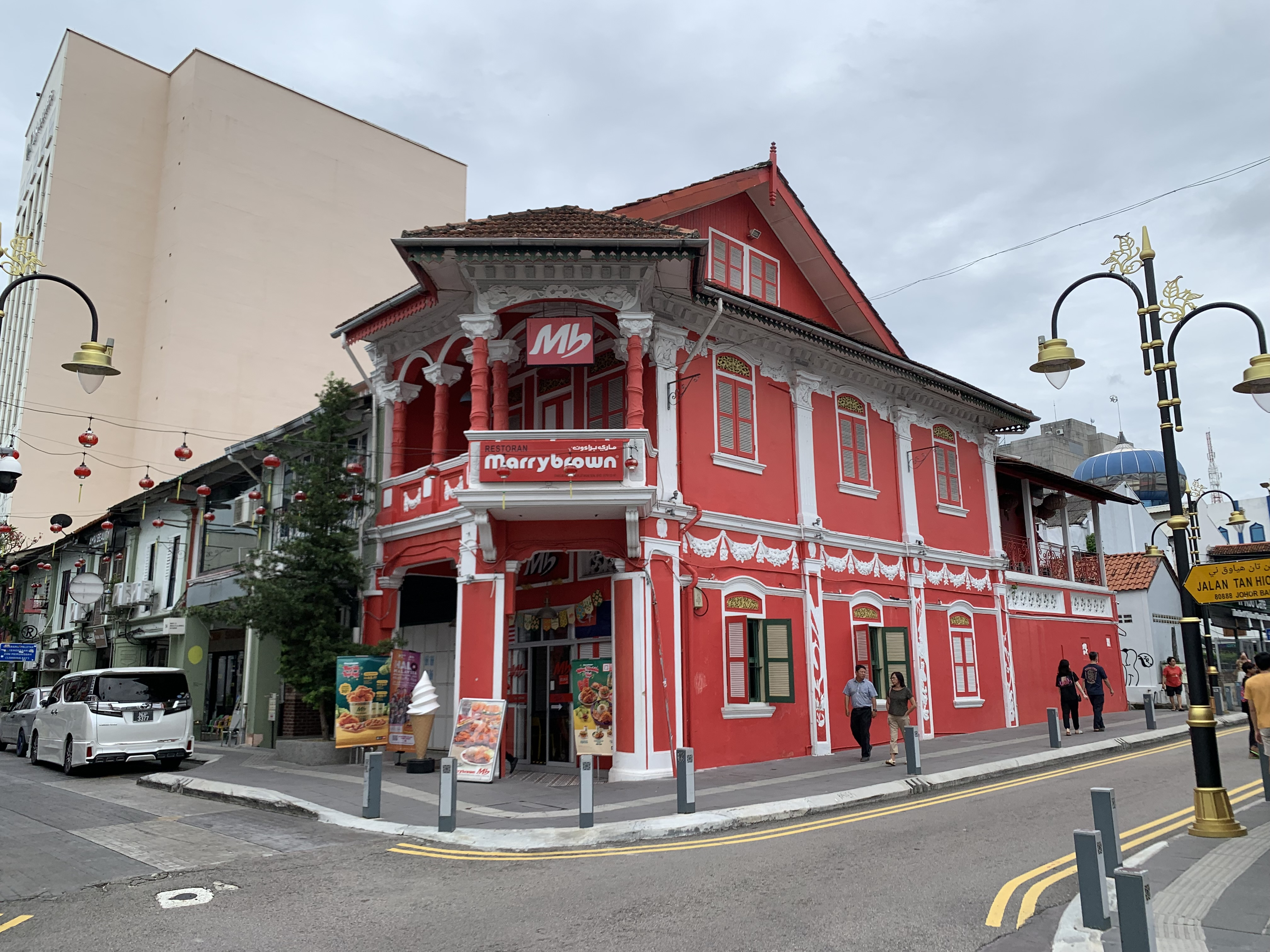
Marrybrown in Johor Bahru, Malaysia.

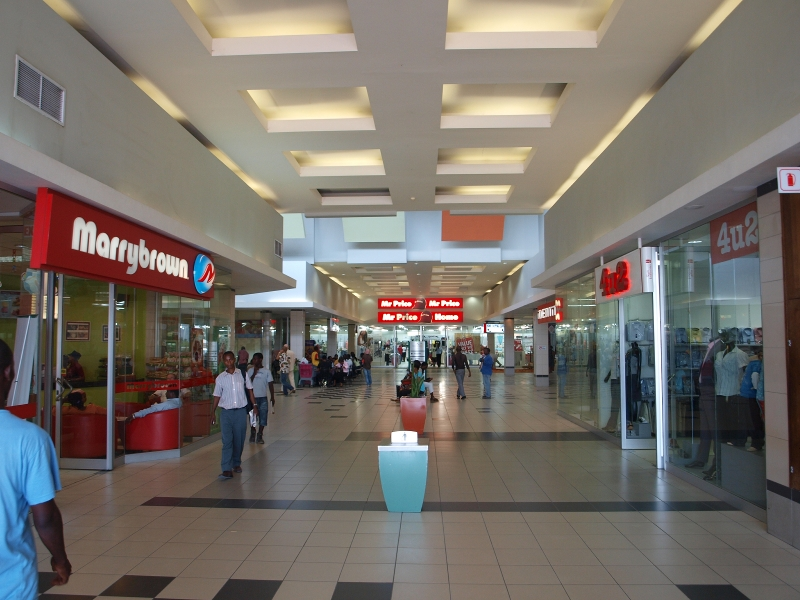
A Marrybrown premise inside the Mlimani City shopping mall in Dar es Salaam, Tanzania

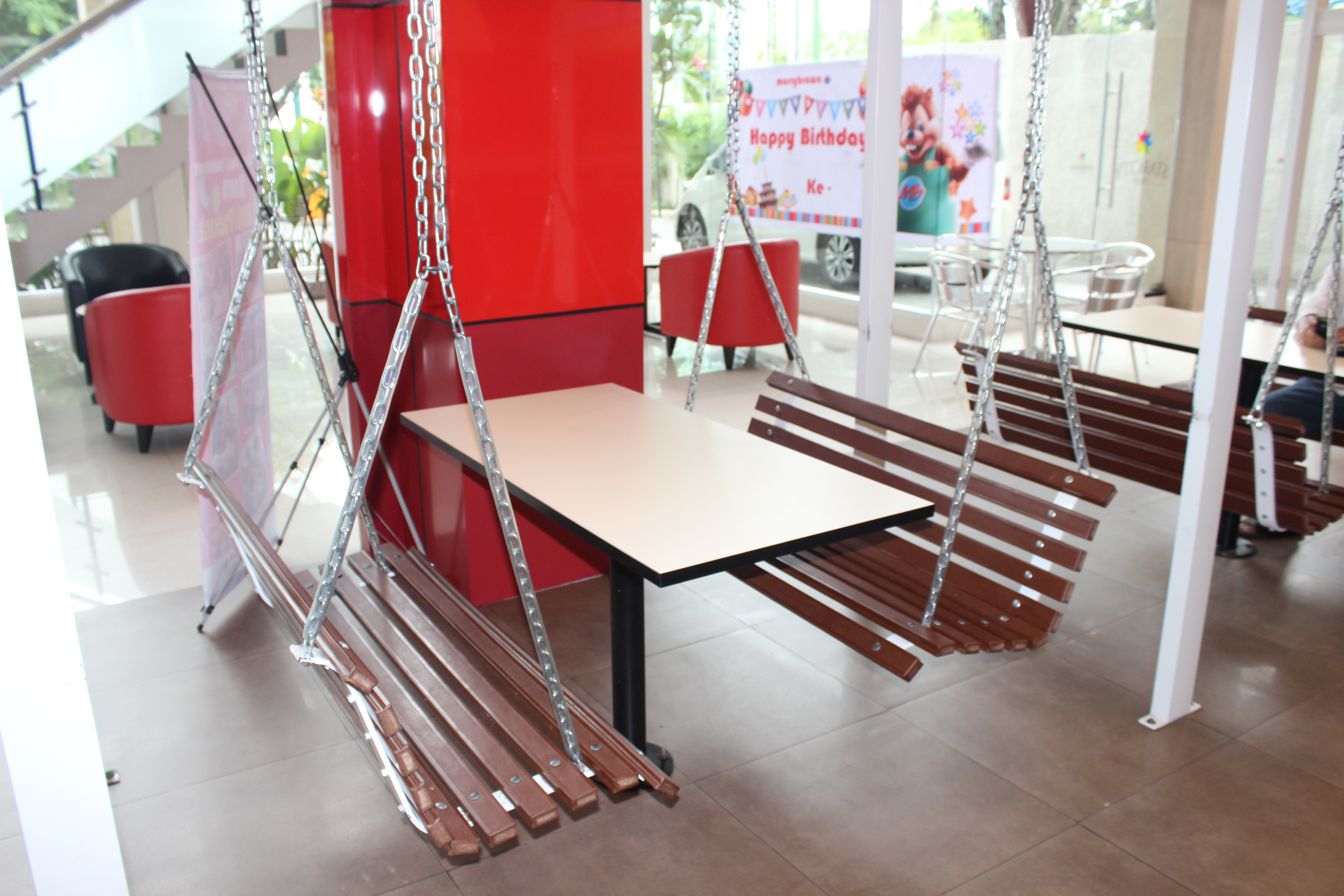
Swing seats in Pekanbaru, Indonesia. Marrybrown has designated a portion of their seating as swing seats since 1996
