= Pie melon =

Pie melon may refer to:

- Cucurbita ficifolia
- Watermelon
