= Ensaïmada =

Pastry product from Mallorca (Balearic Islands)

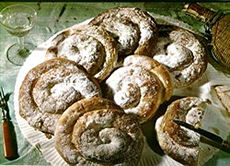
- Ensaïmadas
- Alternative names: Ensaimada
- Course: Bread
- Place of origin: Mallorca, Balearic Islands, Spain
- Serving temperature: Cold
- Main ingredients: Flour, water, eggs, mother dough, saïm (reduced pork lard)

The ensaïmada is a bread product from Mallorca, Balearic Islands, Spain, commonly found in southwestern Europe, Latin America and the Philippines.

The ensaïmada de Mallorca is made with strong flour, water, sugar, eggs, mother dough and a kind of reduced pork lard (called saïm in Catalan) which gives the bread its name. The handmade character of the product makes it difficult to give an exact formula, so scales have been established defining the proportion of each ingredient.

The bread apparently has a Jewish origin, deriving from bulemas, using lard instead of olive oil as a means of escaping the suspicions of authorities during the Inquisition. The first written references to the Mallorcan ensaïmada date back to the 17th century. Though wheat flour was mainly used for making bread, there is evidence this typical bread product was made during that period for festivals and celebrations.

In Mallorca and Ibiza, a sweet called greixonera is made with ensaïmada pieces left over from the day before.

== Variants ==
=== The Balearic Islands ===
Among the variants of ensaimada the most common are:

- Llisa (literally "plain"), with no extra ingredients.
- Cabell d'àngel (literally "angel's hair"), the stringy orange strands found inside pumpkins are cooked with sugar to make a sweet filling which is rolled inside the dough.
- Tallades (literally "sliced"), covered with sobrassada and pumpkin for a bittersweet taste. It is typical of Carnival days preceding Lent, when meat (including lard and sobrassada) are not to be eaten.
- Crema (literally "cream"), with a cream made from eggs.
- Filled with sweet cream, chocolate or turrón paste.
- Covered with apricot.

=== The Philippines ===
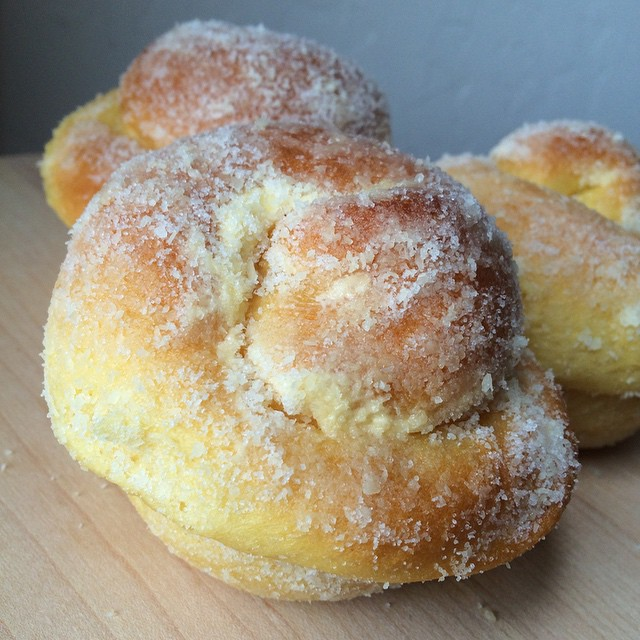
Philippine ensaymadas

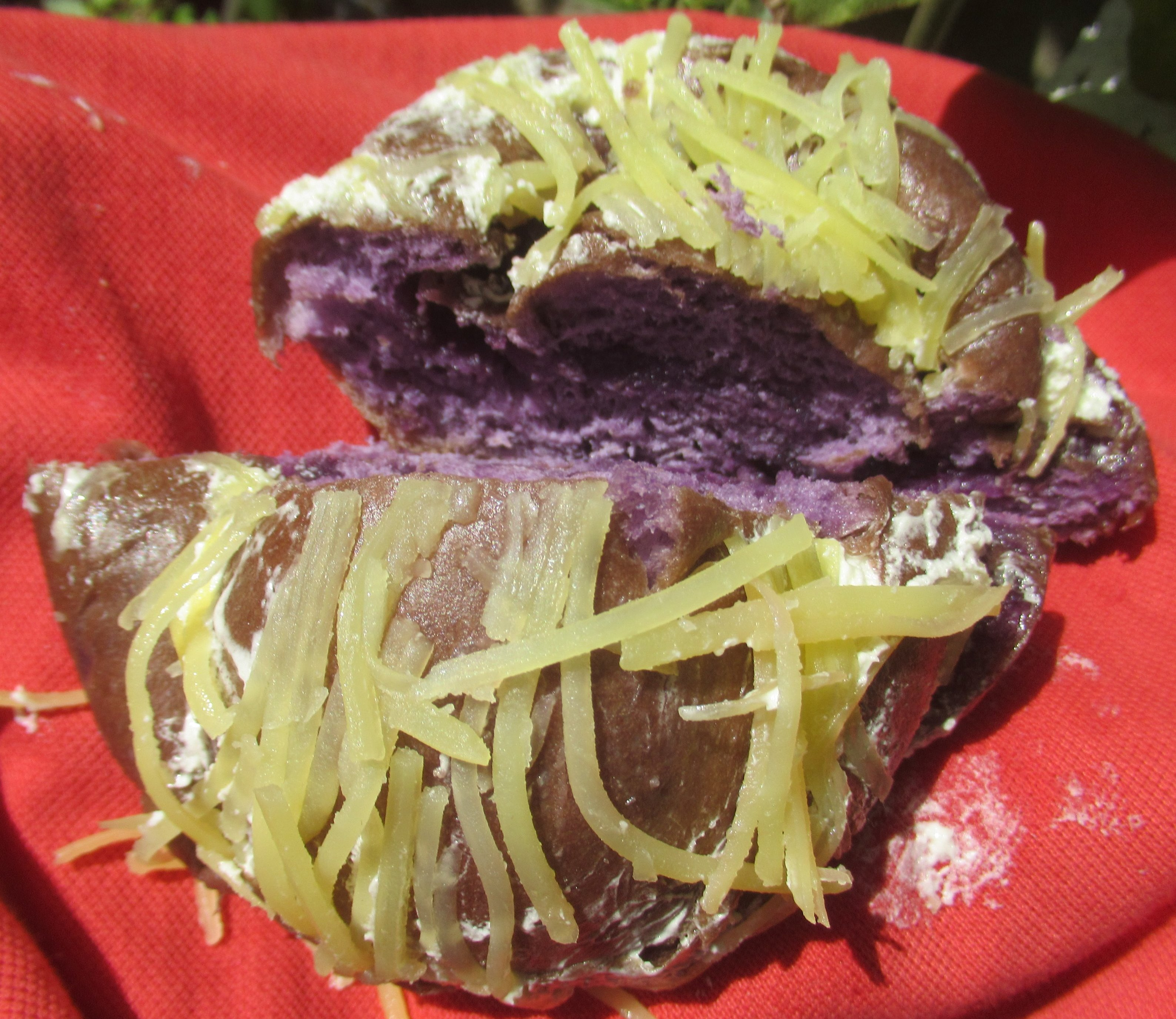
Ube ensaymada

The Philippines also adopted the Mallorcan ensaïmada (commonly spelled ensaymada in Philippine languages). As a Spanish colony for over 300 years, the Philippine variant has evolved over the centuries and is perhaps one of the country’s most common delicacies. The localized pastry is typically a brioche baked with butter instead of lard, and topped with grated cheese and sugar, and can be found in almost all neighborhood bakeshops. Other versions are topped with buttercream, salted egg slices, and an aged Edam cheese called queso de bola. The ensaymada made in Pampanga has a very rich dough with layers of butter and cheese. It is also common to add a sweet mung bean or ube halaya filling. While available year round, ensaymada during Filipino Christmas is customarily paired with hot chocolate made from native tablea.

=== Puerto Rico ===
In Puerto Rico, another Spanish colony until 1898, the ensaïmada is called pan de mallorca and is traditionally eaten for breakfast or as an afternoon snack.

== See also ==
- Bread culture in Spain
- Roscón de reyes
