= Doce de gila =

Portuguese gila squash preserve

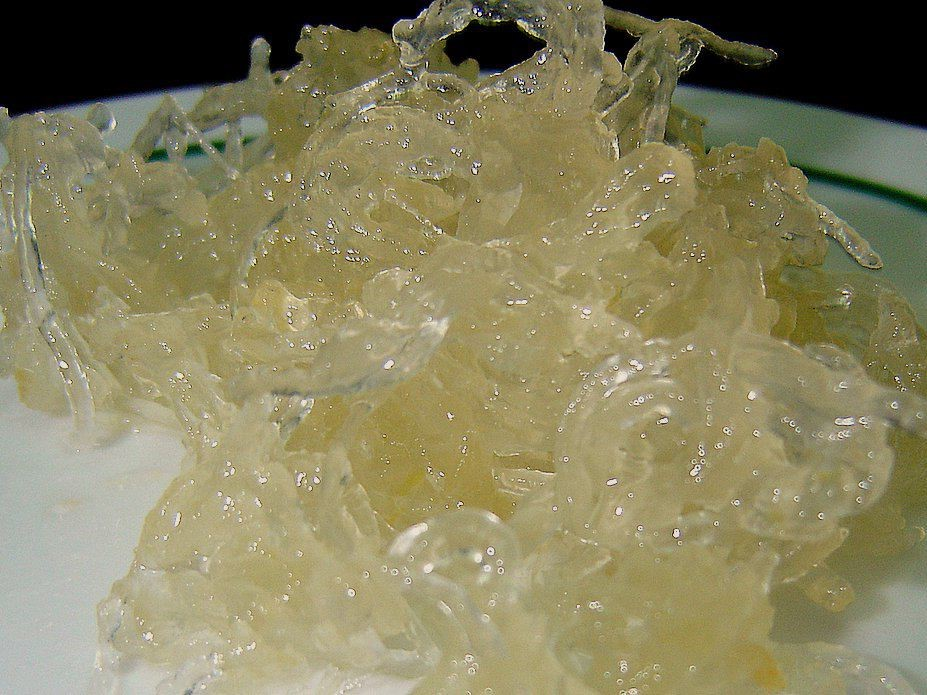
- Transparent threads of preserved Cucurbita ficifolia
- Alternative names: Doce de chila; Doce de xila; spaghetti squash jam
- Type: Fruit preserve
- Place of origin: Portugal
- Region or state: Alentejo
- Main ingredients: Cucurbita ficifolia, white sugar, water
- Ingredients generally used: Cinnamon, citrus peel, salt
- Similar dishes: Cabello de ángel (cabell d'àngel), alcitrón

Doce de gila is a Portuguese fruit preserve made from the pulp of the Cucurbita ficifolia. It can be used as jam or as an ingredient in various desserts and pastries.

== Background ==
The Cucurbita ficifolia is native to the Americas and was brought to Portugal a result of the Columbian Exchange. The name "gila" is derived from the Nahuatl name "chilacayohtli" (English: chilacayote), a plant belonging to the Cucurbitaceae family which includes cucumbers, melons, squashes, and pumpkins. It is similar to Cucurbita pepo (spaghetti squash), which is a common substitution for gila.

== Preparation ==
Rather than cutting it open with a knife, the gila squash is traditionally thrown on the ground to break it open. It is then rinsed several times. The rough chunks of squash are parboiled in water until the flesh is able to be removed from its skin. The skin is discarded while the pulp is drained. A syrup is made with water and sugar in a separate pot. A stick of cinnamon, and sometimes lemon or orange peel, is often added to the syrup to scent the preserve. The drained pulp is added to the syrup and cooked until it reaches 116 °C or has the consistency of marmalade. The mixture is cooled before bottling or used in another application.

== Uses ==
Doce de gila is made throughout Portugal and is often used as a jam on toast. In Alentejo, it became a common staple ingredient in many traditional conventual sweets such as pão de rala, porquinho doce, bolo folhado, tiborna, and azevia. It is also found in desserts in Sri Lanka such as "love cake".

== Gallery ==
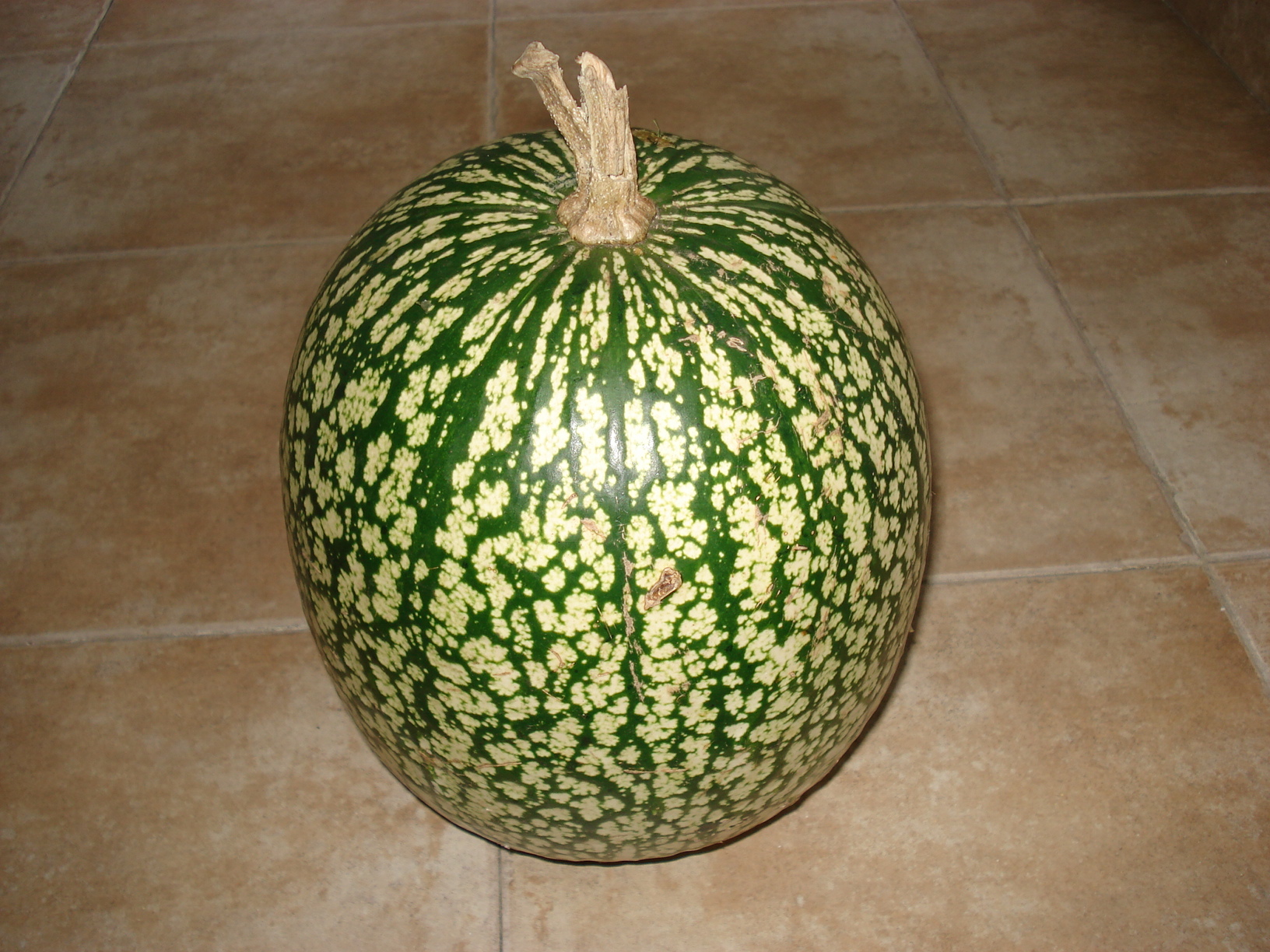
Cucurbita ficifolia

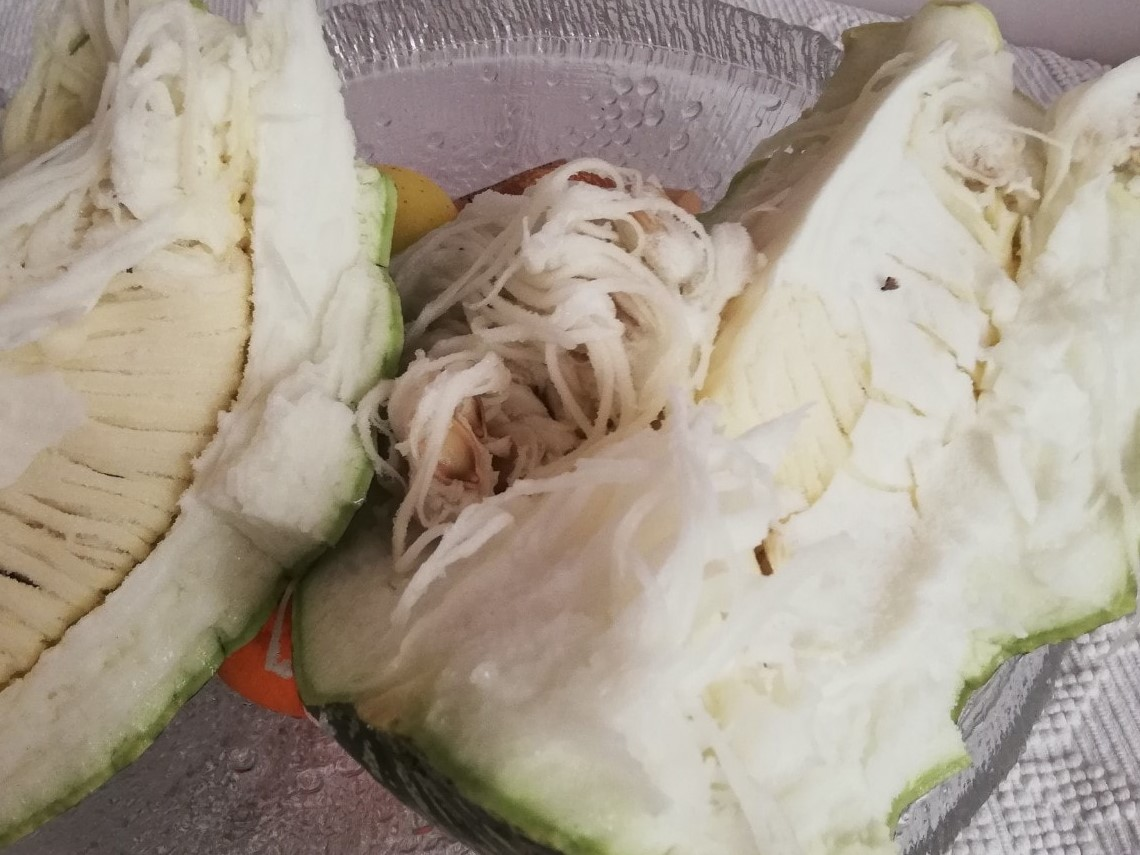
Gila cracked open with characteristic threads

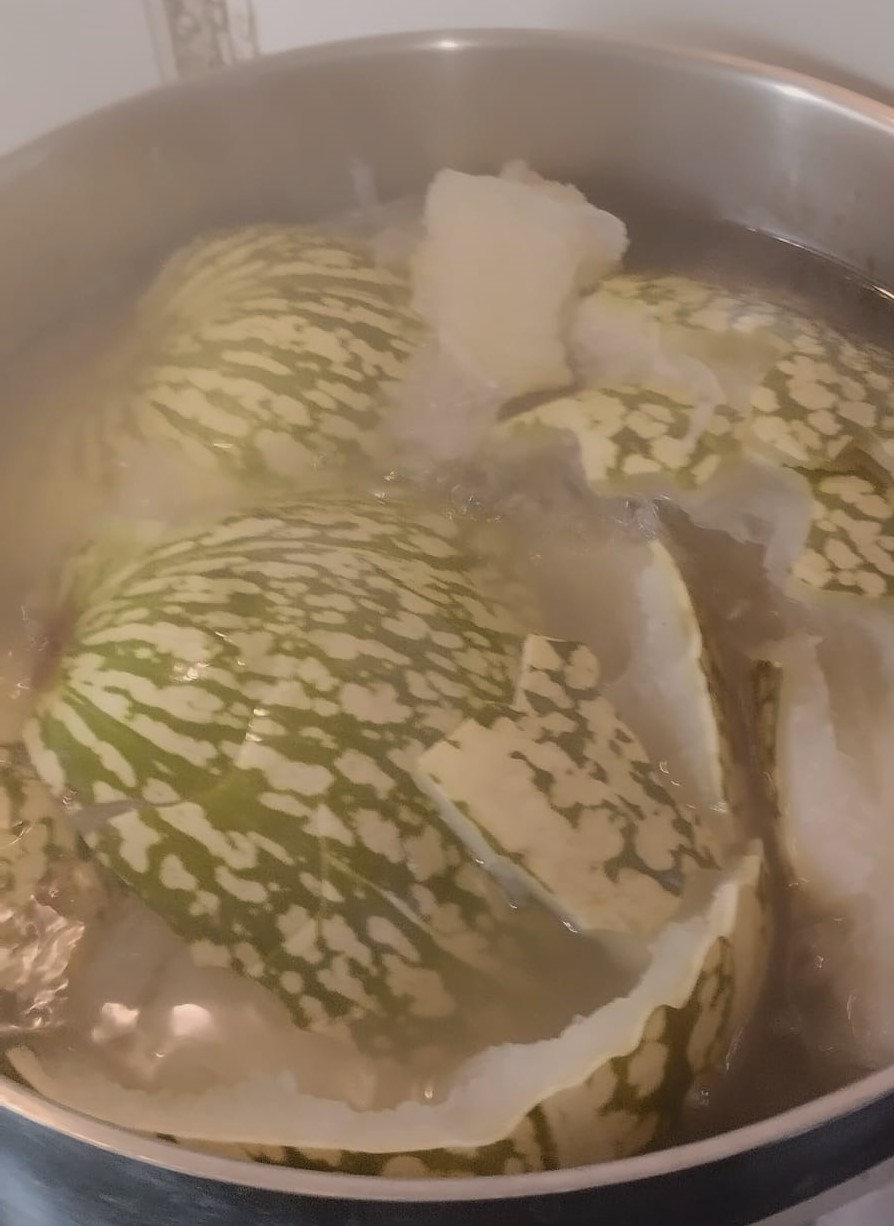
First parboiling

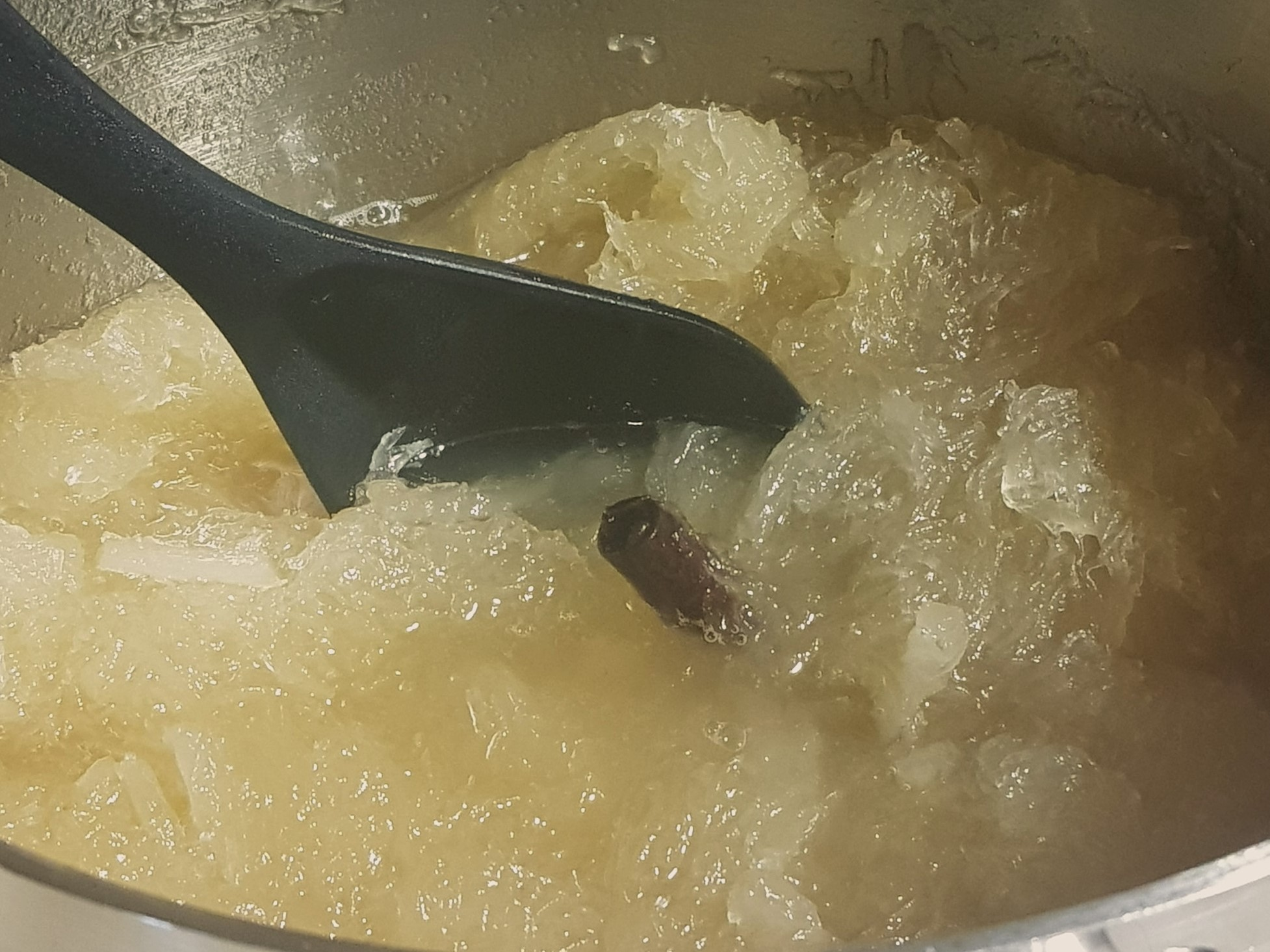
Infusing with cinnamon stick

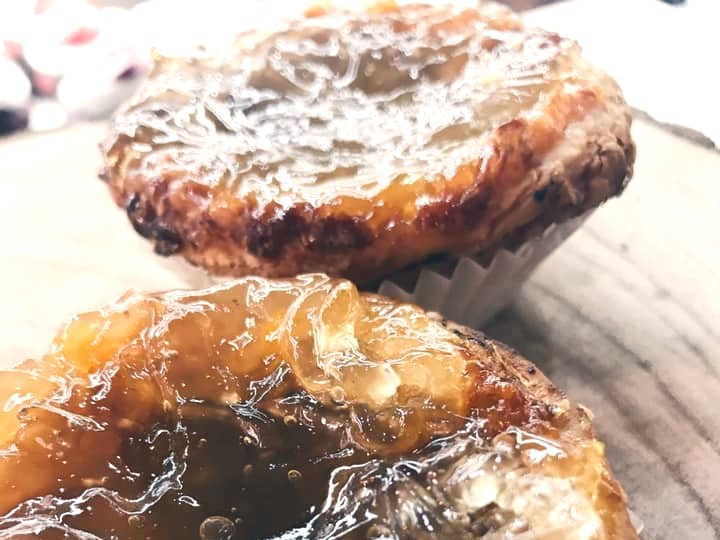
Pastry topped with doce de gila

== See also ==
- Cabello de ángel
- Conventual sweets
- Pão de rala
- Portuguese cuisine
