= Pastisset =

Stuffed fried pastries from Catalan, Valencian, and Aragonese cuisine

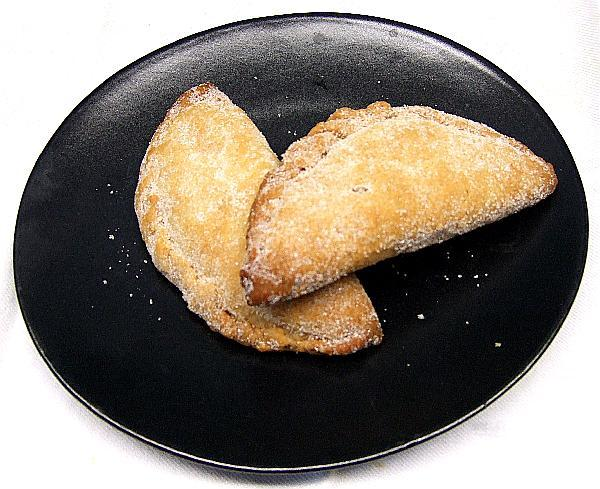
- Alternative names: Casquetes, pastissets (Catalonia), flaons, moniatos (Valencian Community), tortas de alma (Aragón)
- Type: Pastry
- Place of origin: Spain
- Region or state: East Spain (Aragón, Catalonia, Valencian Community)
- Main ingredients: Olive oil, flour, eggs, Catalan moscatell, anissette

Pastissets (Catalan pronunciation: [pəstiˈsɛts]), also called casquetes, pastelicos, dulces de alma or flaons are stuffed fried pastries from Catalan cuisine, Valencian cuisine and Aragonese cuisine. They can be filled with cabell d'àngel jam, sweet potato jam, or almonds, even with mató cheese and codonyat. They are typical of Terres de l'Ebre and in Valencian Community. In Mallorca, there is a very similar preparation called rubiol.

== Preparation ==
In Amposta they are made with a mixture of olive oil, flour, eggs, Catalan moscatell and anissette, which is cut in circles. They are stuffed, folded by the middle and closed by pressing softly, often with a fork. They are cooked and covered with sugar.

== Gallery ==
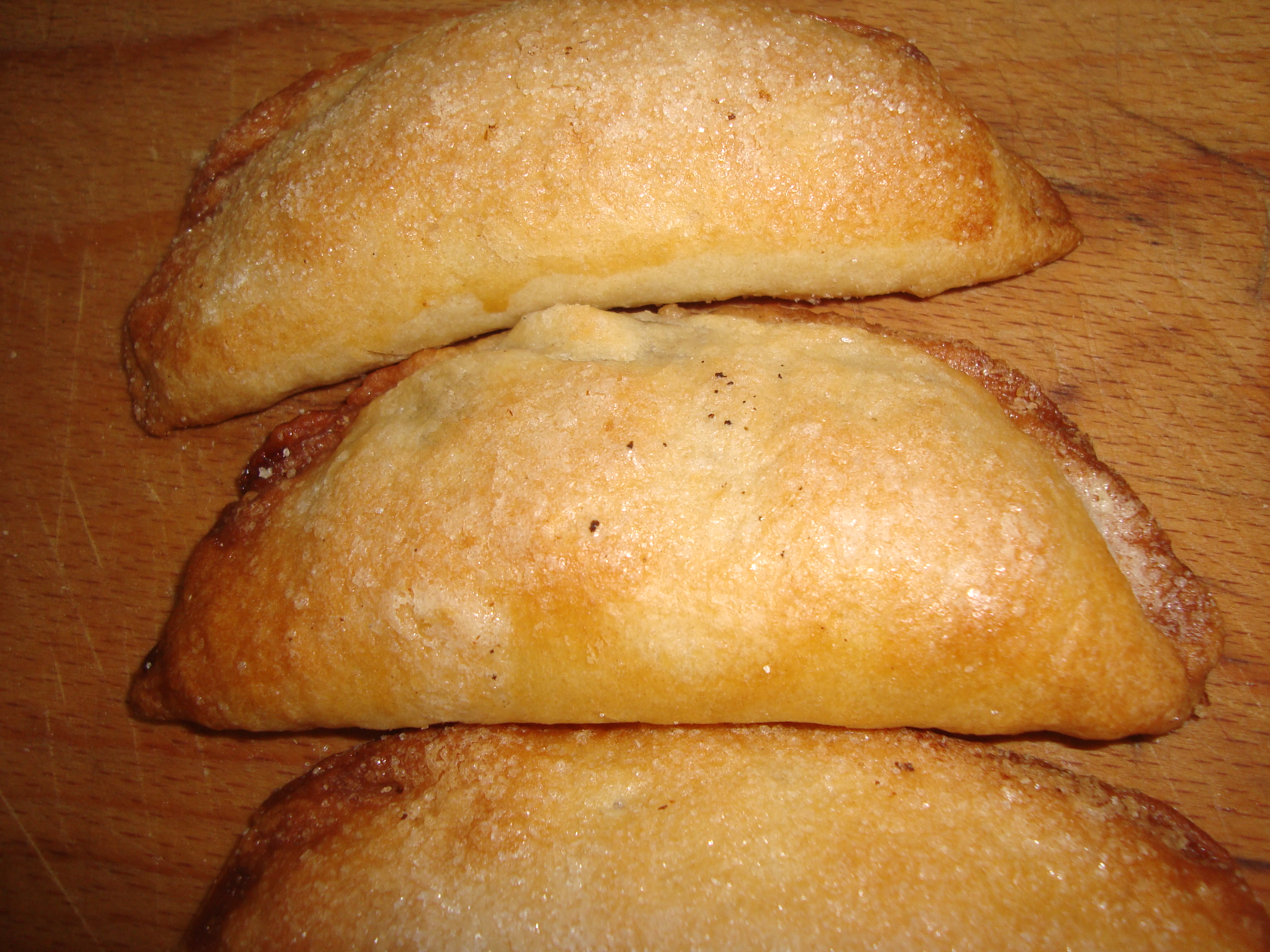
Pastissets de moniato

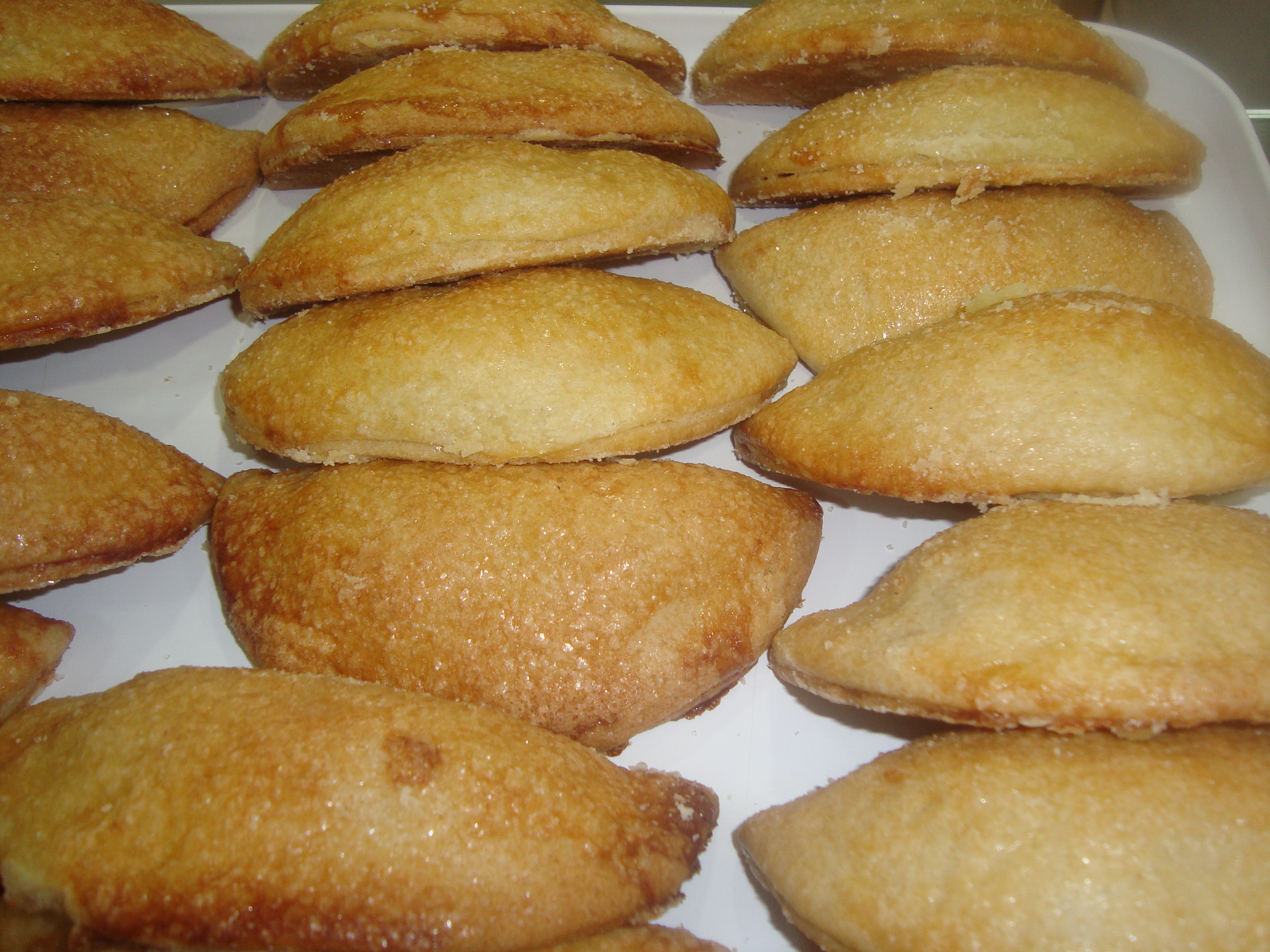
Pastissets de carabassa i mel

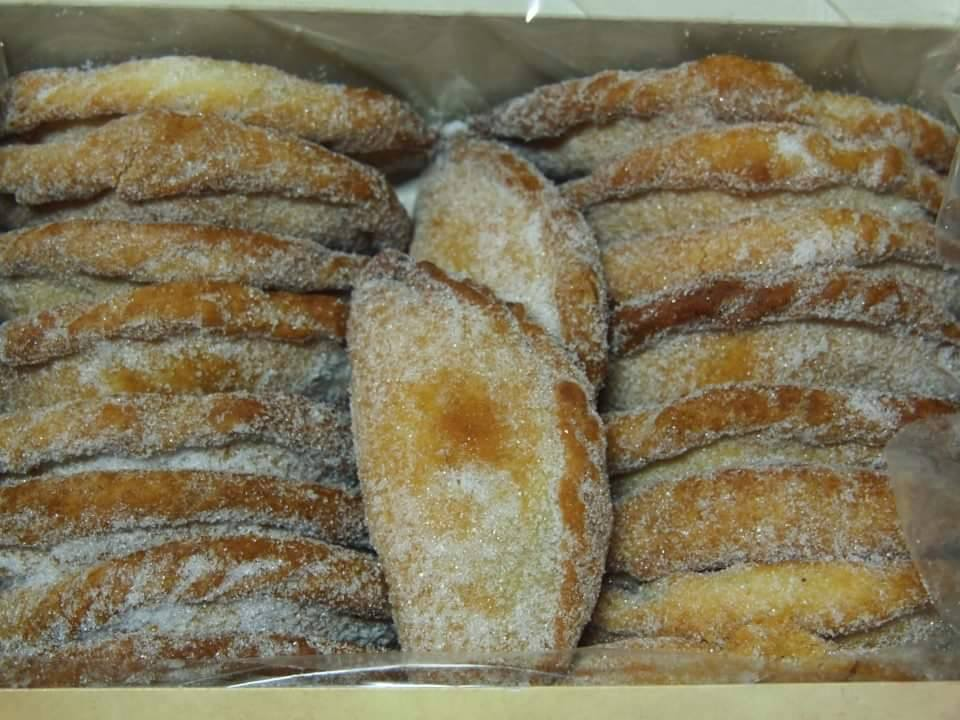

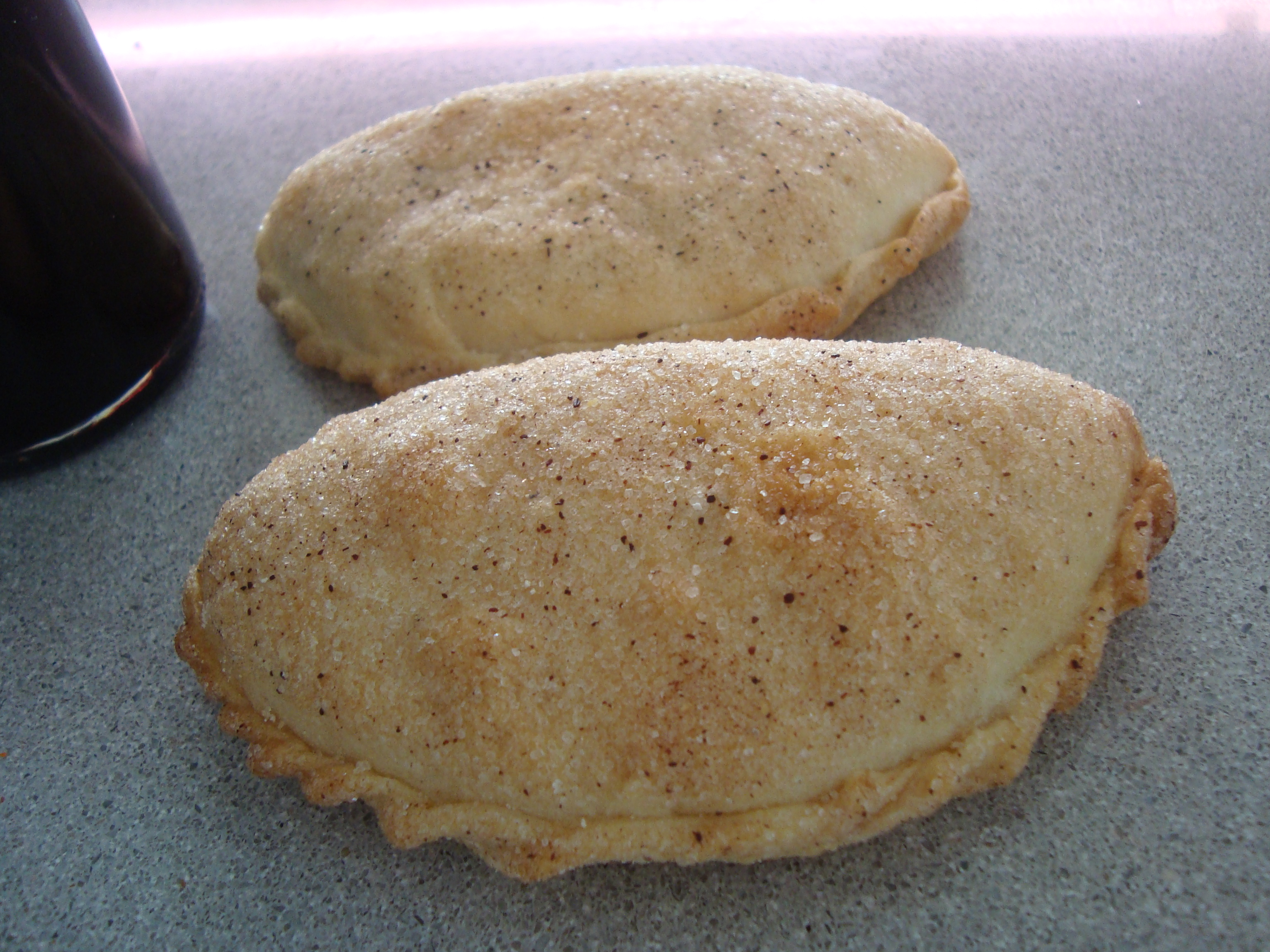
Flaons de Xert

== See also ==
- Catalan cuisine
- List of doughnut varieties
- List of fried dough varieties
