= Cabell d'àngel =

Type of pumpkin jam

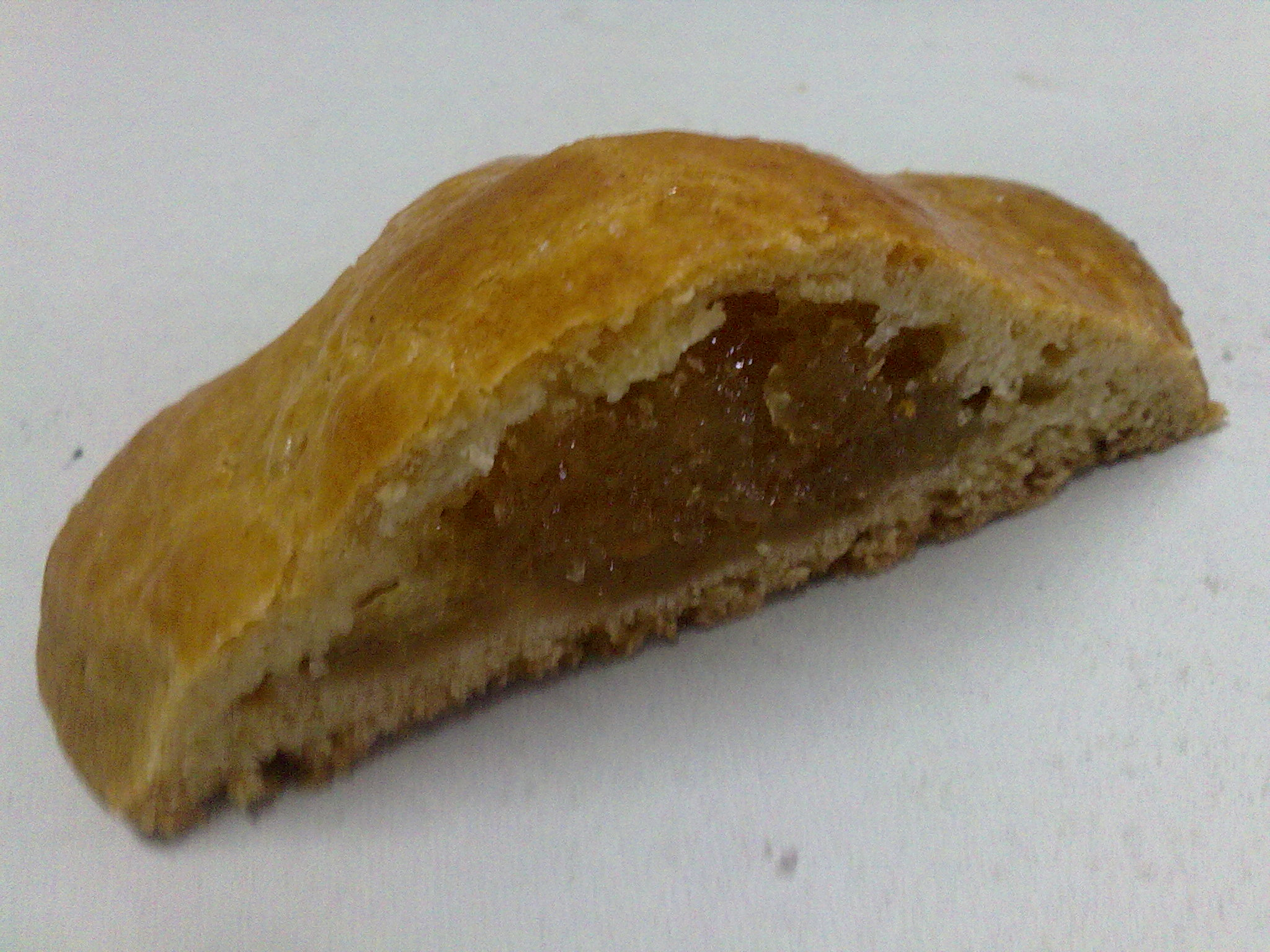
- Pastry filled with Cabell d'àngel
- Alternative names: Cabello de ángel
- Type: Spread
- Place of origin: Spain
- Region or state: Mallorca
- Main ingredients: Cucurbita ficifolia pulp, sugar
- Variations: Doce de gila

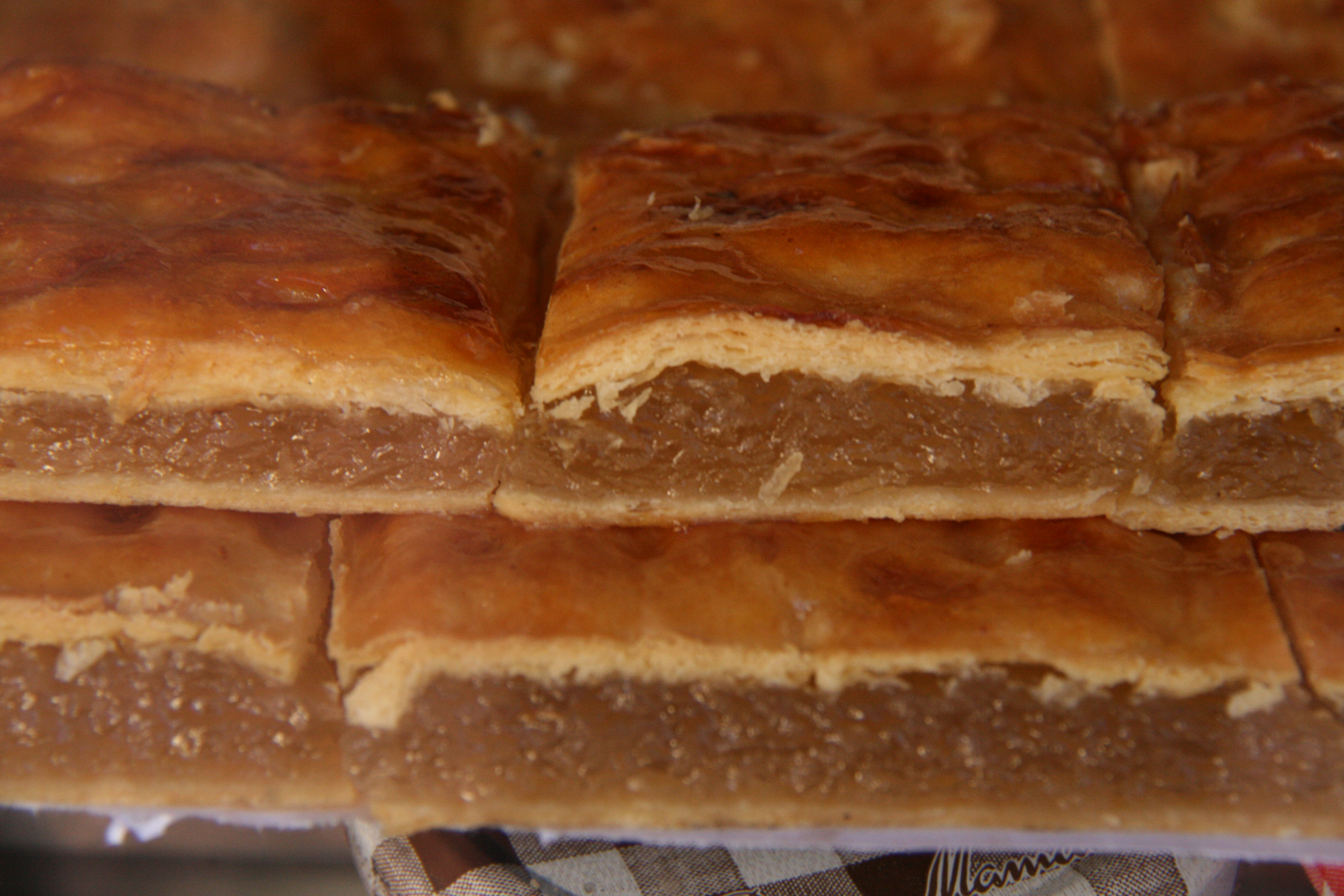
Bayonesa is pastry stuffed with Cabell d'àngel.

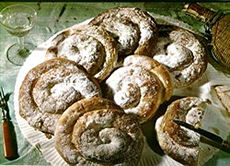
Ensaïmades are often stuffed with this jam.

Cabell d'àngel (Catalan: [kəˈβɛʎ ˈdaɲʒəl] cabell d'àngel; literally "angel's hair") is a transparent threaded jam made from Siam pumpkin (Cucurbita ficifolia) pulp and white sugar. It originated in Mallorca but its use has spread to the rest of Spain and some countries in the Americas.

== Uses ==
Cabell d'àngel can be used simply as a pumpkin jam spread on slices of bread, but it is mainly used to stuff pastries, as ensaïmades, pastissets and coques.

== Preparation ==
The pumpkin is boiled in water until it falls apart into fibres. This pulp is cooked in sugar syrup with slow and frequent stirring. In Mallorca, it is baked instead of being boiled, intensifying the flavour. The jam can be seasoned with cinnamon or citrus zest. It is best when prepared in the spring, once the pumpkins have fully matured.

== See also ==
- Cucurbita ficifolia
- Doce de gila
- List of spreads
