= Çorbalık kesme =

Turkish pasta

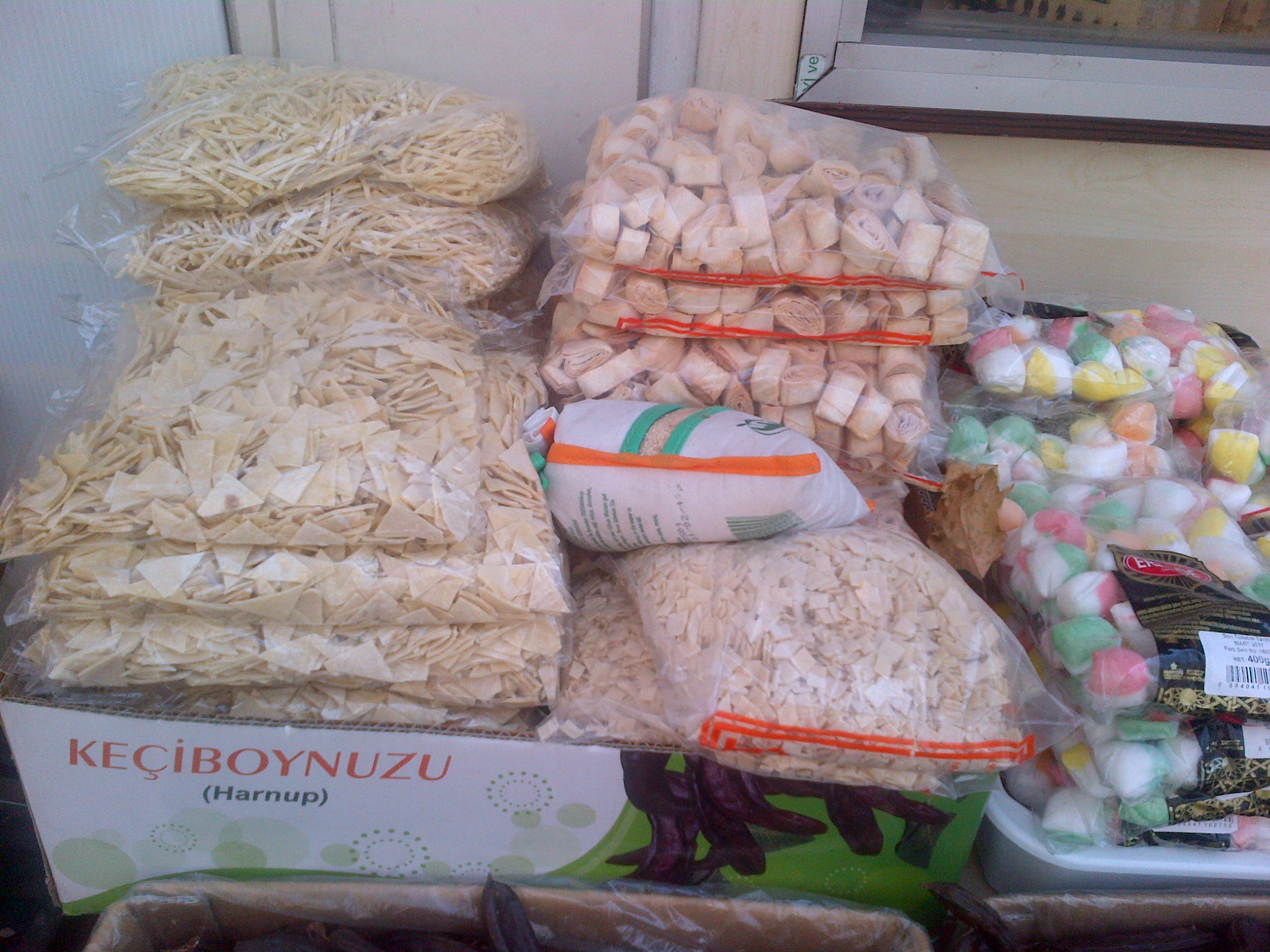
- Alternative names: Çorbalık kesme erişte, çorbalık erişte, kare erişte
- Type: Pasta
- Place of origin: Turkey
- Main ingredients: Flour, eggs, milk, salt

Çorbalık kesme, corbalık kesme erişte or kare erişte is a traditional Turkish pasta made from flour, eggs, milk and salt. They take the form of small squares or, in some regions, long thin strips (usually called by different names) similar to kesme.

Some common dishes made with çorbalık kesme are chicken noodle soups, kayseri kesme çorbası, baked chicken with red sauce, or simple boiled pasta dish with oil and cheese.

== See also ==
- Kesme
