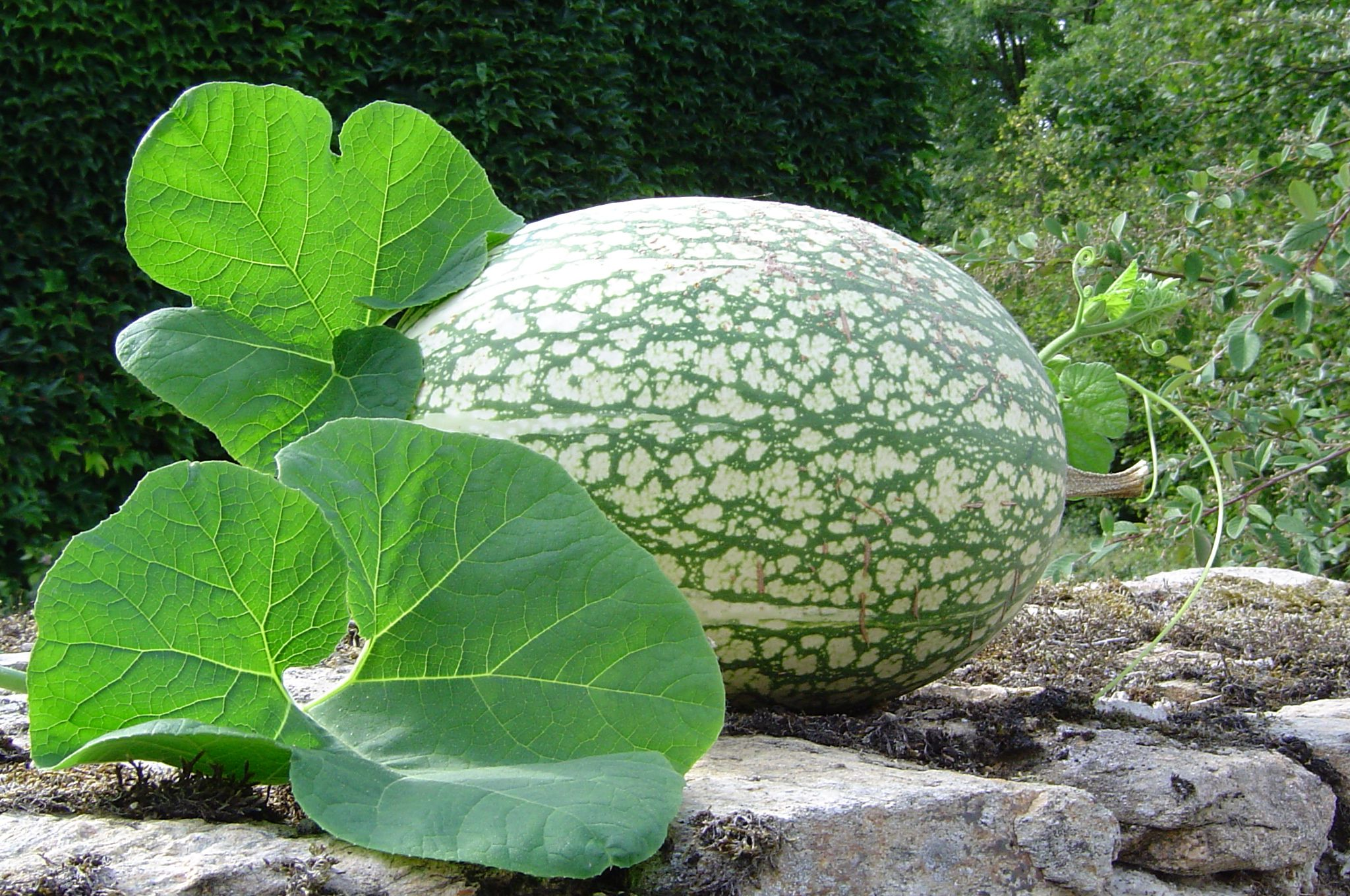

Scientific classification
- Kingdom: Plantae
- Clade: Tracheophytes
- Clade: Angiosperms
- Clade: Eudicots
- Clade: Rosids
- Order: Cucurbitales
- Family: Cucurbitaceae
- Genus: Cucurbita
- Species: C. ficifolia

Binomial name
- Cucurbita ficifolia Bouché

Synonyms
- Cucurbita melanosperma A.Braun ex Gasp.; Cucurbita mexicana Dammann; Pepo ficifolia (Bouché) Britton; Pepo malabaricus Sageret

= Cucurbita ficifolia =

Species of flowering plant

Cucurbita ficifolia is a species of squash, grown for its edible seeds, fruit, and greens native to the Americas. It has common names including black seed squash, chilacayote, cidra, fig-leaf gourd, and Malabar gourd. This species is grown widely from Argentina and Chile to Mexico. It is also cultivated in regions of the world including India, Japan, Korea, China, the Philippines, Ethiopia, Kenya, Tanzania, and Angola.

No named agricultural cultivars have been recognized. Compared to other domesticated Cucurbita species, samples of C. ficifolia gathered throughout its range are relatively similar to one other in morphology and genetic composition. Variations do occur in fruit and seed color, some isozymes, and photoperiod sensitivity.

== Common names ==
- Asian pumpkin
- black-seed squash
- chilacayote
- chiverri or chiverre
- cidra
- citron chayote
- figleaf gourd, fig-leaf gourd, fig-leaved gourd
- lacayote
- Malabar gourd
- pie melon
- shark fin gourd or shark fin melon
- Siam squash
- sidra
- Thai marrow
- Victoria

== Description ==
Early botanical keys described Cucurbita ficifolia as a perennial that is grown as an annual in temperate climates. More recent investigations have found that C. ficifolia is an annual that does not differ in longevity from the other annual domesticated Cucurbita species. As with these other annual species, C. ficifolia can have a vine habit that can root at the nodes. Provided proper conditions including a frost-free climate, it can grow for an indefinite amount of time in this manner. The plant stem can grow five to fifteen meters and produces tendrils that help it climb adjacent plants and structures. Its leaves resemble fig leaves, hence its Latin species name ficifolia, which means fig leaf.

The plant is monoecious with imperfect flowers (meaning its flowers are either male or female but both sexes can be found on the same plant) and are pollinated by insects, especially bees. The color of the flowers is yellow to orange.

Biosystematic investigations confirm that C. ficifolia represents an earlier evolutionary branch than the other major cultivated Cucurbita species, but also indicate that this species is not as biologically distinct as some earlier botanists had concluded.

In contrast to other domesticated Cucurbita that have highly variable fruit, the fruit of C. ficifolia is uniform in size, shape, and color. The fruit is always oval, resembling a watermelon. This species is the only Curcubita to have black seeds, but some C. ficifolia also have dark brown or buff colored seeds that are similar to other species in the genus. The fruit is oblong with a diameter of eight inches or 20 centimeters, weighs eleven to 13 pounds (5 to 6 kilograms), and can produce up to 500 seeds. Its skin can vary from light or dark green to cream. One plant can produce over 50 fruit. The fruit can last without decomposing for several years if kept dry after harvest.

Non-morphological indications of genetic diversity within the species include its cultivation across a wide geographic range. Another reflection of genetic diversity is that C. ficifolia is grown in a variety of agricultural systems ranging from high competition such as in heavy rain maize fields, to less competitive and more intensive cultivation such as dry season maize fields, vegetable gardens, and commercial agricultural plots. Variations in productivity may also reflect genetic diversity within the species.

C. ficifolia has been noted to form interspecific hybrids with Cucurbita maxima, Cucurbita moschata, and Cucurbita pepo. Interspecific hybrids have generally been infertile beyond the first generation unless techniques such as embryo cultivation are used.

== Origin and distribution ==
It is native to the Americas, although the exact center of domestication is unclear. Linguistic evidence suggests Mexico, because of the wide use of names based on the Nahuatl name "tzilacayotli" or "chilacayohtli" as far south as Argentina. Biosystematics has been unable to confirm either hypothesis. A literal translation of tzilacayotli is "smooth squash".

Archeological records suggest that C. ficifolia was once the most widespread variety of Cucurbita in the Americas, cultivated from northern Chile and Argentina northwest to Mexico. C. ficifolia is believed to have spread first from South America to the Malabar Coast of India in the 16th and 17th centuries before later reaching Europe. Some of its common names including Asian pumpkin, Malabar gourd, Siam squash, and Thai marrow reflect this route of dispersal to Europe.

== Cultivation ==
The fig-leaved gourd grows in temperate highlands at elevations up to 2,000 metres (6,600 ft). It is often used as a grafting rootstock for other less resistant cucurbits. C. ficifolia can be propagated through planting seeds and by layering. Nodes can grow roots, and can propagate new plants once cut. It is not resistant to severe frosts.

== Uses ==
=== Culinary ===
==== Shell and flesh ====
Some cuisines cook the immature fruit as a summer squash. Mature winter squash fruits are used as the basis for stranded vegetable pasta, sweets, and beverages.

In Spain this squash is used to make a jam known as "cabello de ángel" (angel's hair), "cabell d'àngel" in Catalan, that is used to fill pies, sweets and confectionery. In Portugal, where the fruit is known as "chila" or "gila", the jam is known as "doce de gila", is used extensively in the production of traditional Portuguese sweets and confectionery.

In Chile jam is often made out of the fruit. In Costa Rica, it is traditional to make empanadas stuffed with sweetened filling called miel de chiverre at Easter time.

In Honduras, particularly in the city of Siguatepeque, it is cooked, and made into confectionary called alcitrón.

In Asia, the pulp strands are used to make soup, quite similar to shark fin soup, hence the name "shark's fin melon". The cultivation and this usage feature briefly in the film Grow Your Own.

==== Seeds ====
The most nutritional part of Cucurbita ficifolia is its fat- and protein-rich seeds.Cilacayote seeds are used in Mexico to make palanquetas, a sweet similar to peanut brittle.

==== Flowers, leaves, and shoots ====
The flowers, leaves and tender shoots are used in Mexico and other countries as greens.

=== Medicinal ===
Across Asia, eating Cucurbita ficifolia is said to help people with diabetes. Several scientific studies have confirmed its hypoglycemic effect. It is used effectively to treat diabetes due to its high D-Chiro-Inositol content.

=== Animal feed ===
The vine and fruit are used for fodder. In Portugal, it has been used to feed pigs.

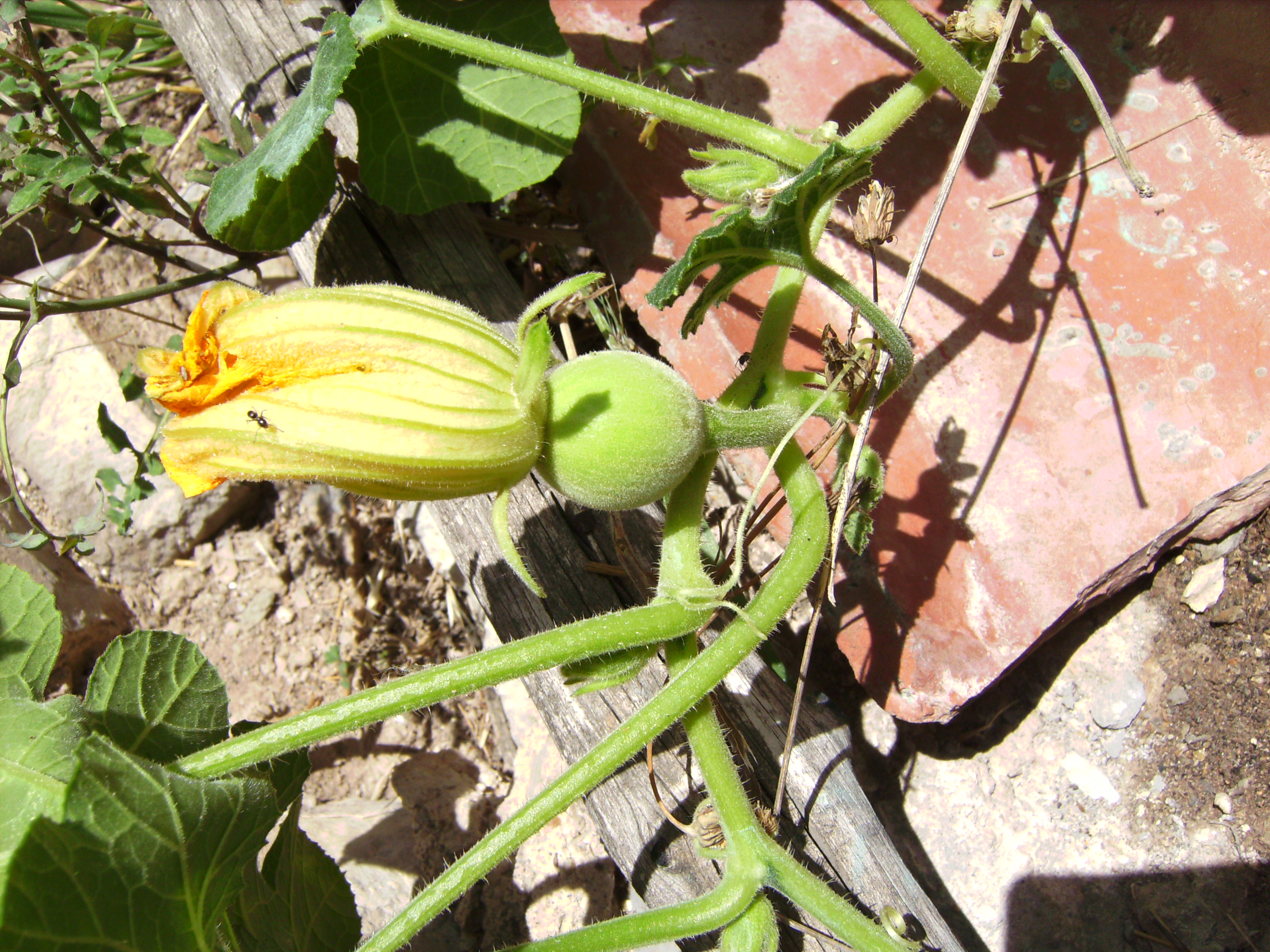

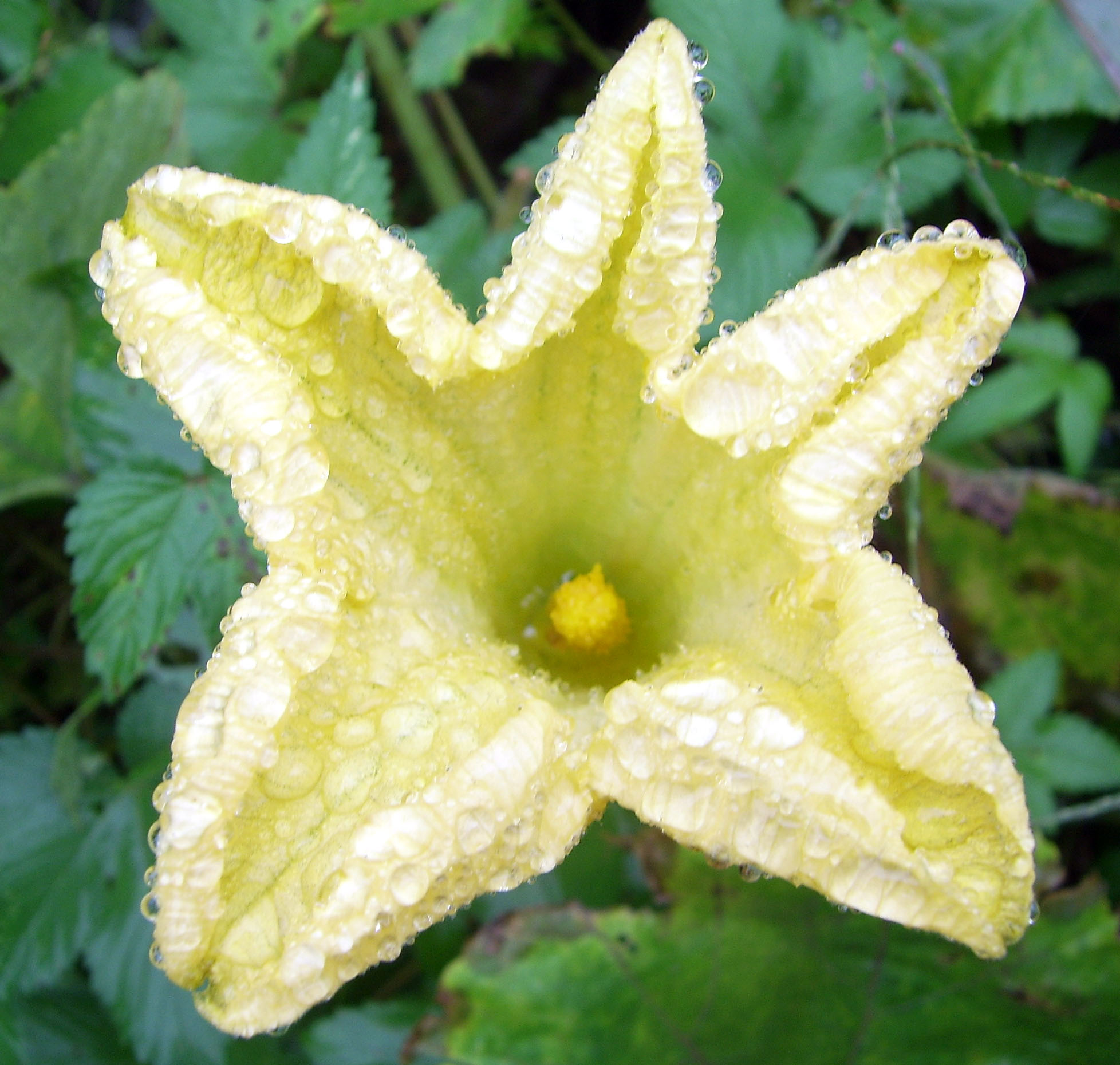

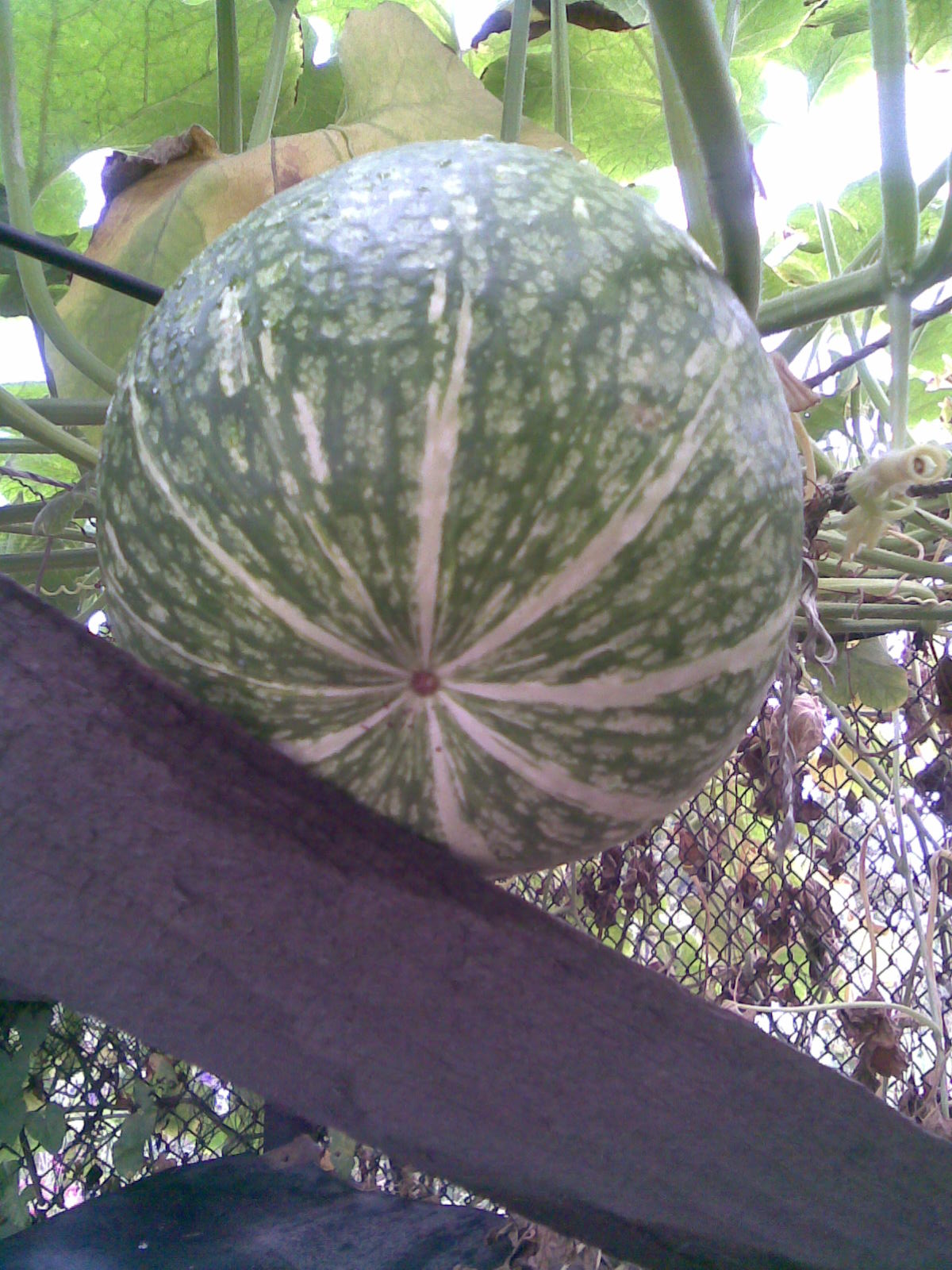

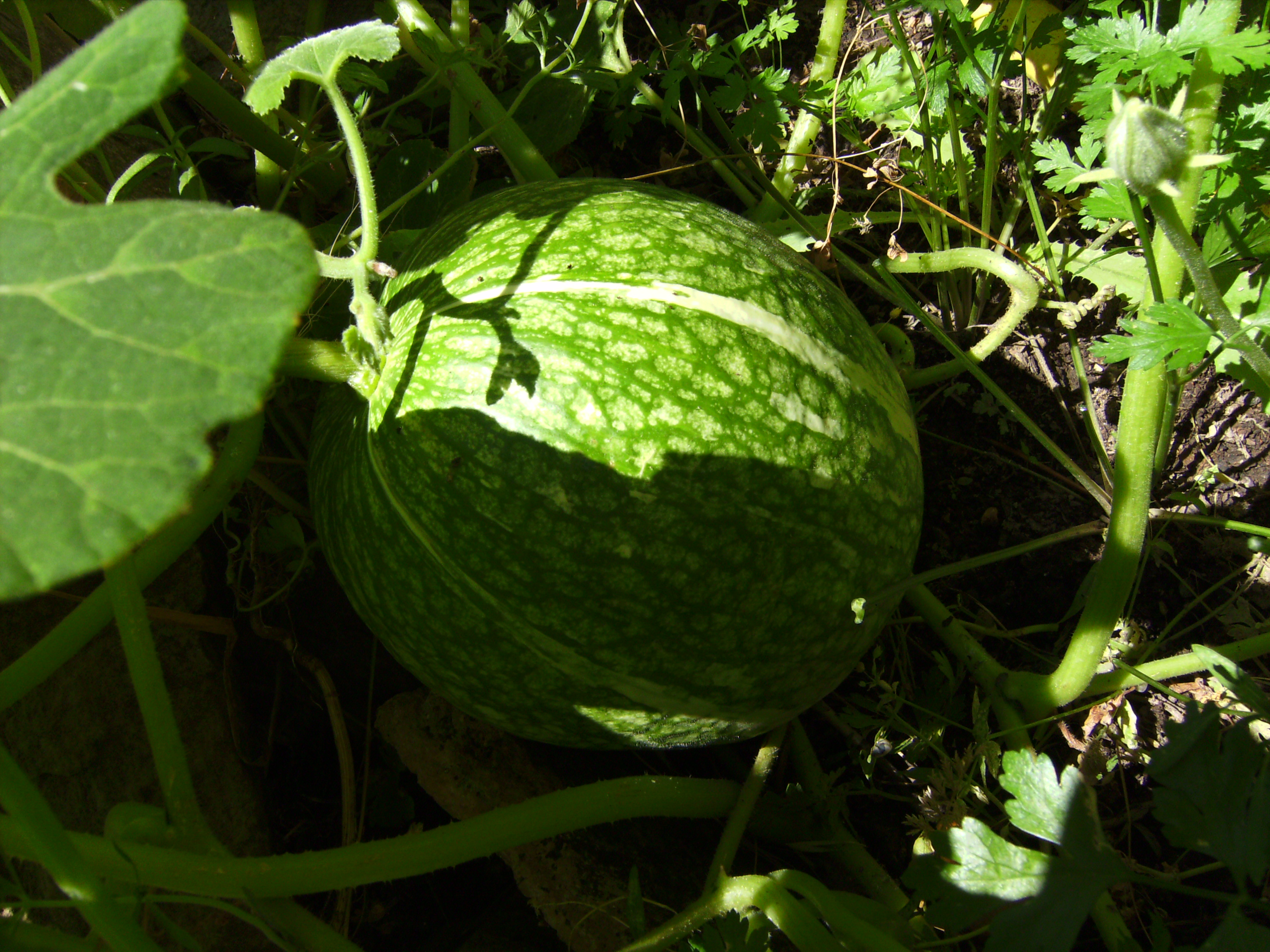
