= Kesme =

Traditional egg noodles found in various Turkic cuisines

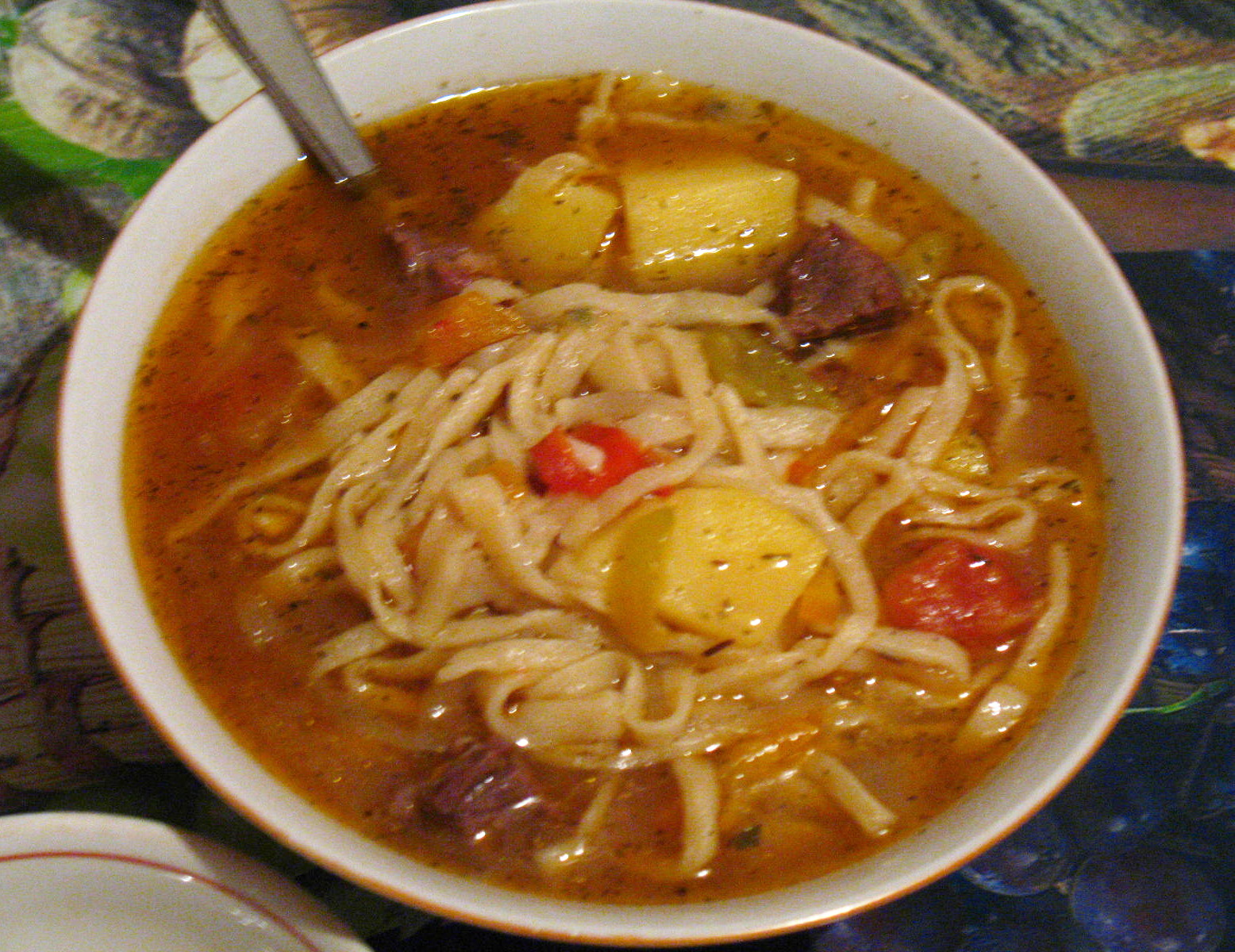
- A bowl of kesme soup
- Alternative names: Reshte, Reshteh
- Type: Noodle
- Place of origin: Turkic countries.
- Region or state: Central Asia
- Main ingredients: Flour, water, salt, an egg

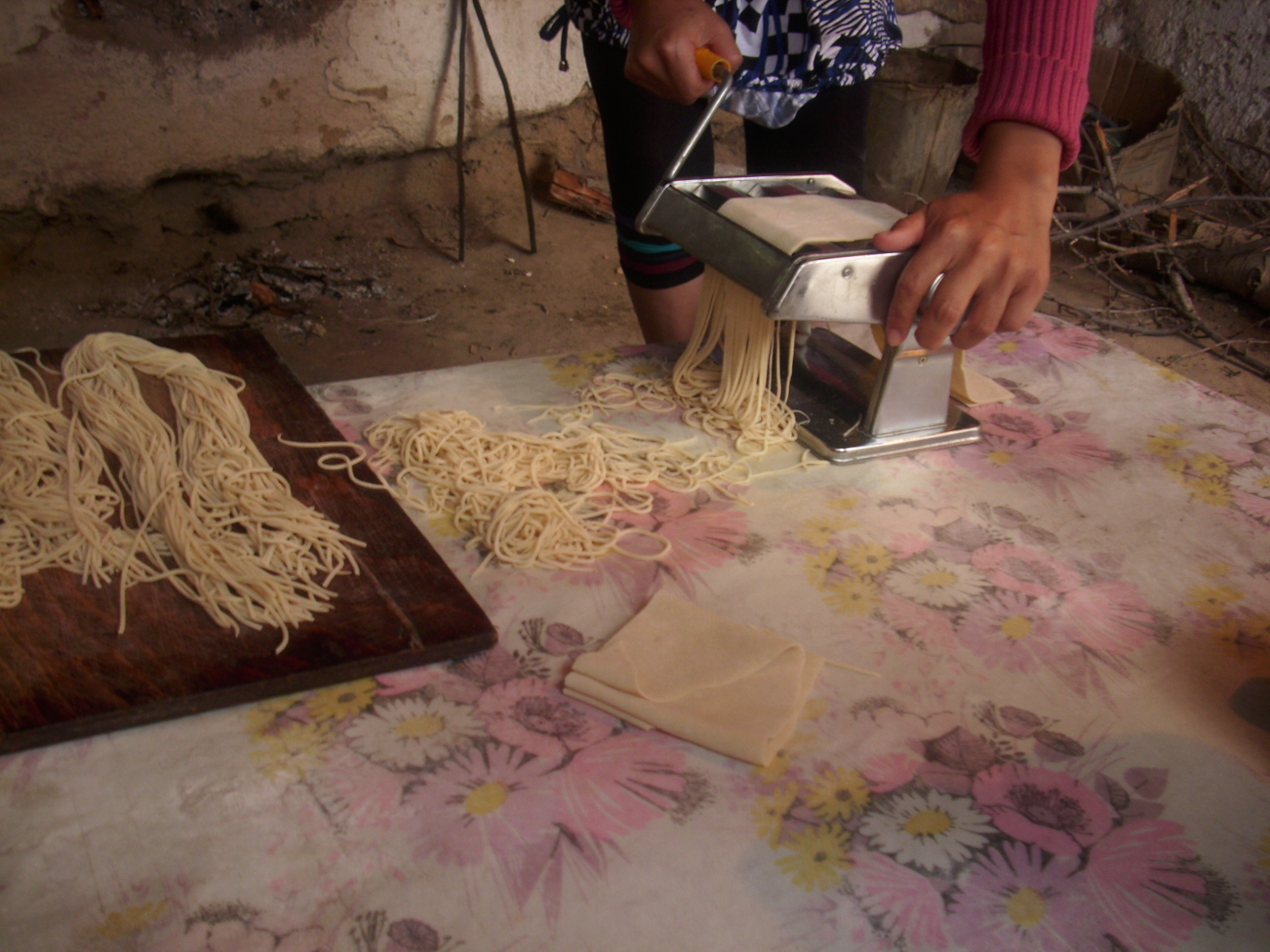
Kesme

Kesme or erişte is a type of egg noodle found in various Central Asian countries. It is also found in Turkish cuisine and is called erişte and “kesme” in modern standard Turkish. The word itself is a nominalisation of the verb to cut or to slice, referring to the slicing of the dough involved in preparing the noodles. The term may refer to the noodles themselves, or the prepared dish made with them. Kesme is traditionally a homemade dish, and not often found at restaurants or cafés. In Turkey, kesme is also known as "erişte", and eaten generally in winter. It is made from flour, egg, water, salt and milk. These ingredients are worked into a dough, which is rolled out, cut, and dried in the sun or an oven after drying for a day.

== Kesme preparation ==
The dough for kesme usually consists of flour, water, salt, and an egg. The dough is rolled out into a large thin circle, and left to dry for a while. It is then lightly floured, folded over several times accordion-style, and sliced into strips, which are then separated. The process has been illustrated, step by step. The kesme may be boiled immediately in a broth often containing ingredients such as potatoes, meat, carrots, peppers, and tomatoes, or left to harden and stored. Kesme is often made in a kazan.

== Reshteh ==
Reshteh (Persian: رشته) or reshte are Persian whole wheat noodles, traditionally the noodle would be a homemade item. The reshteh used in the Iranian cuisine can be a thicker, whole wheat noodle used in reshteh polow (rice and noodle pilaf dish) and in ash reshteh (noodle soup). "Reshteh" was the only word for noodles in Arab cookbooks of the 13th and 14th centuries. A recipe substitution for reshteh noodles, is often linguine or whole-wheat noodles.

=== Reshteh polow ===
Special symbolism is given to dishes that contain noodles when a decision of importance or change is to occur; the noodles or "reins" of one's life are to be taken in hand. A traditional dish in Iran is reshteh polow, which is served during the Persian new year with the noodles representing the threads of life and family intertwined. Noodles are used for special occasion dishes in giving thanks and for journeys especially to Mecca. In reshteh polow the noodles are broken into parts, fried or grilled brown, and then added to rice.

== Mass production ==
In Turkey, the pasta is mass-produced as erişte.

== Gallery ==
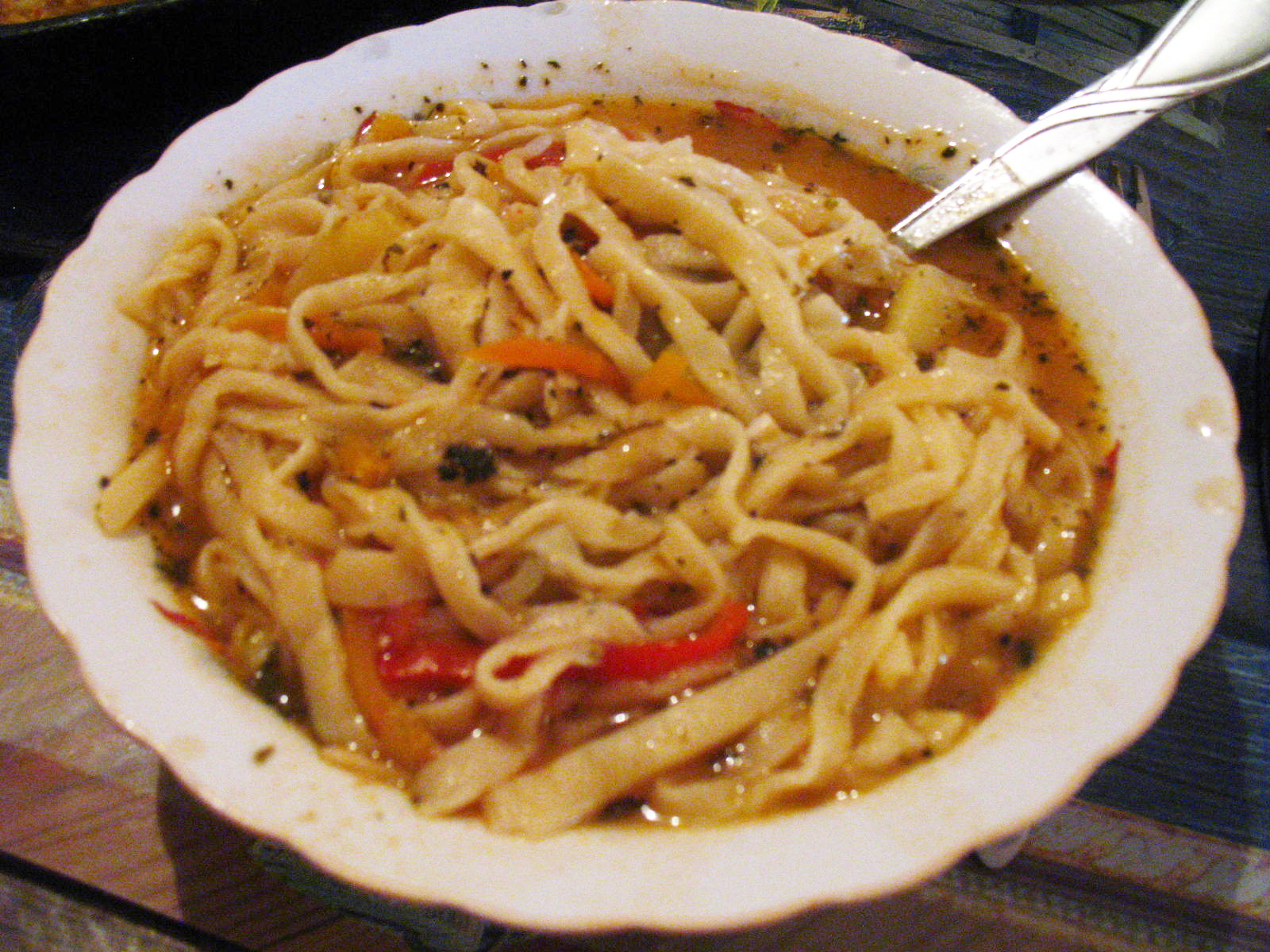
A bowl of kesme in broth

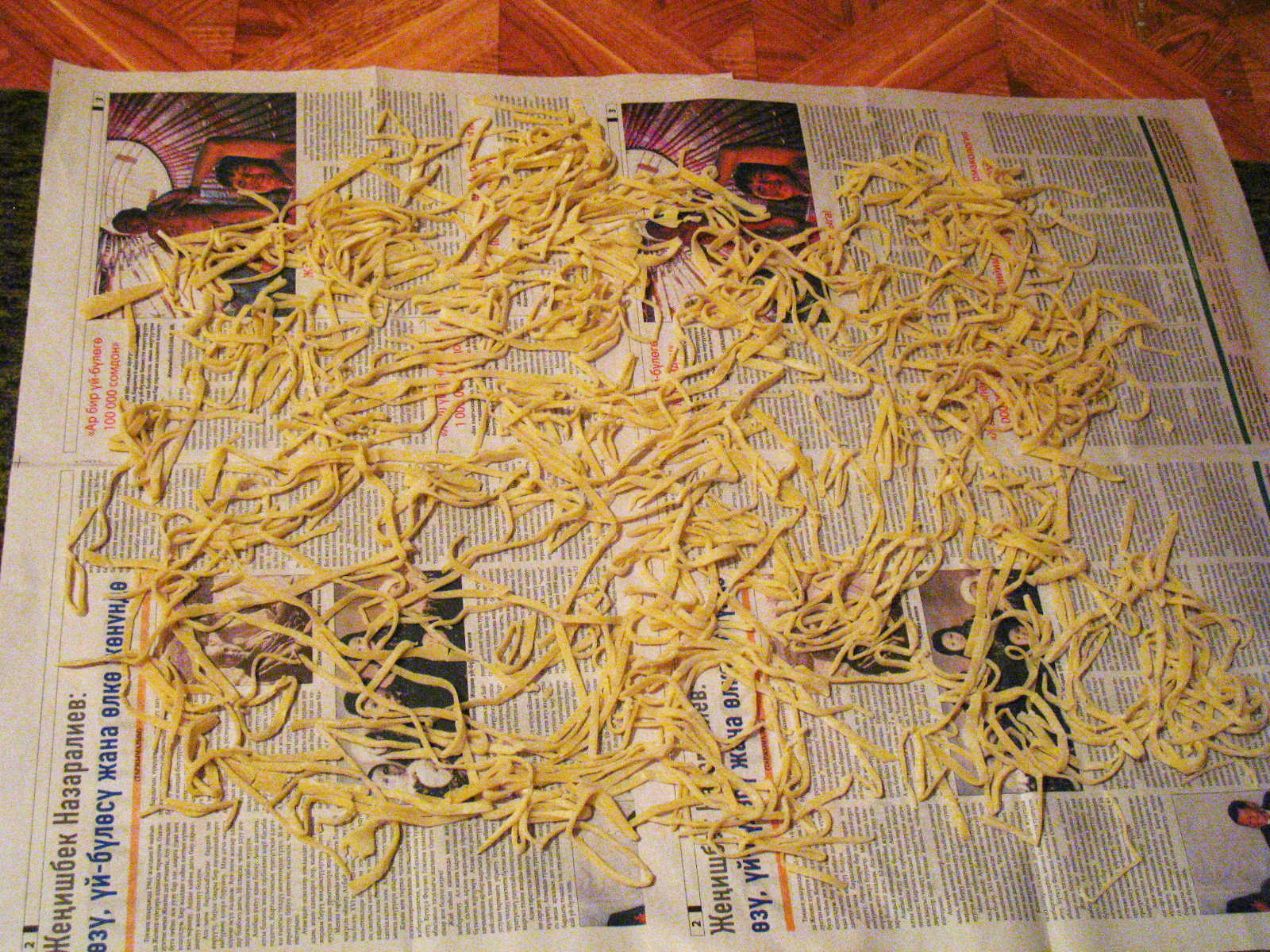
Kesme noodles, laid out to dry

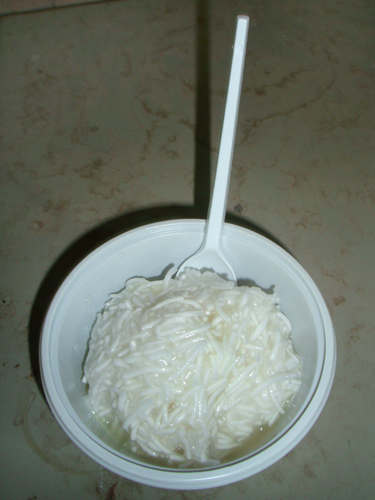
Faloodeh, a traditional Shiraz dessert

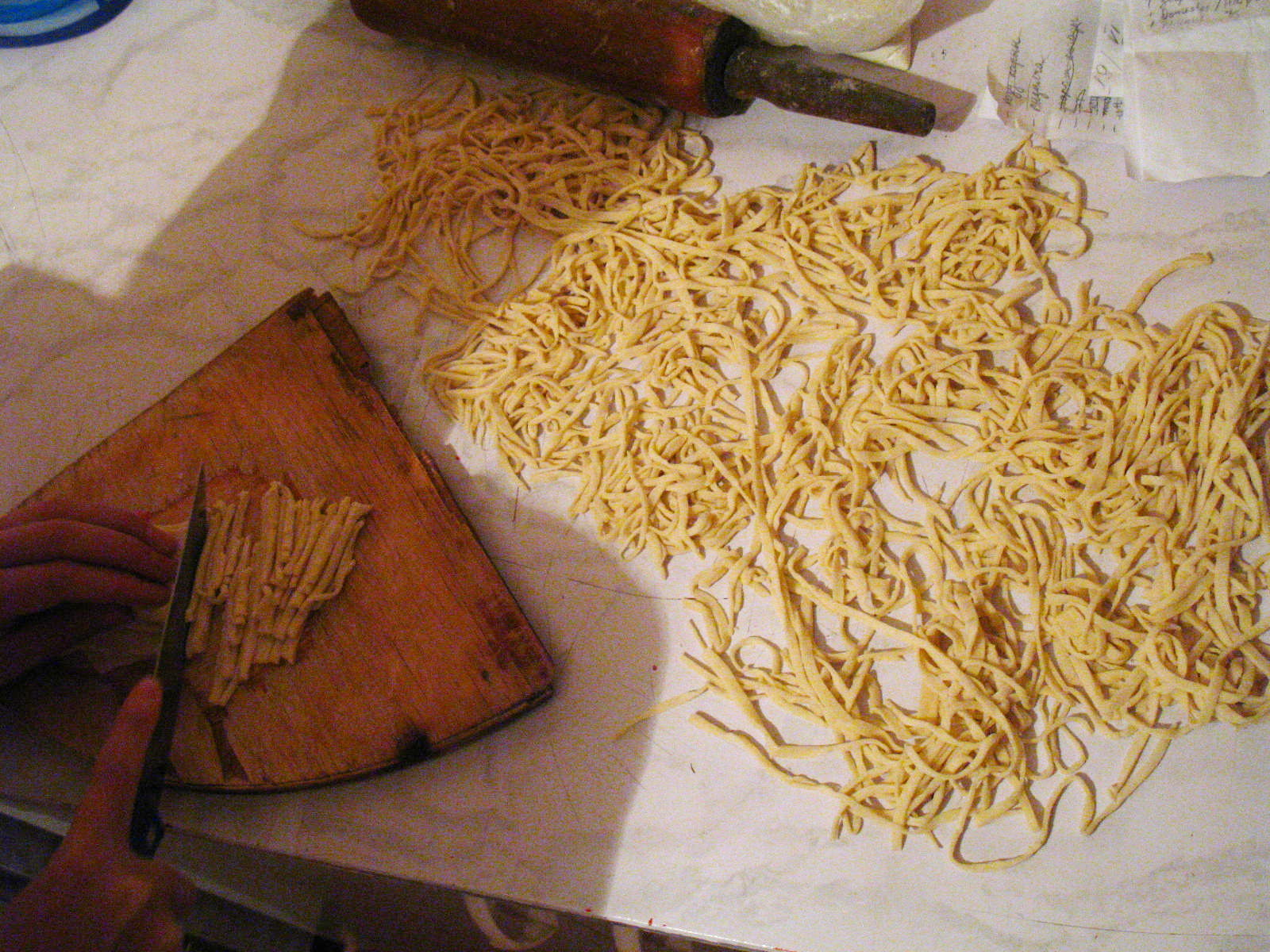
Kesme dough being cut into noodles

== See also ==
- Beshbarmak - Central Asian mixed noodle dish
- Laghman - Central Asian and Uyghur pulled noodle dish
- Thukpa - A Tibetan noodle soup
- Tsuivan - A Mongolian noodle dish
