= Pain de Gênes =

Almond cake

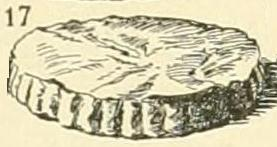
- Alternative names: Genoa bread
- Type: Cake
- Place of origin: France
- Region or state: Paris
- Main ingredients: almond paste, eggs, butter

Pain de Gênes (lit. 'bread of Genoa') is a cake made largely from almond paste, eggs and softened butter, but only a minimal amount of flour. Another unusual aspect is that no raising agent is used, instead the rise is achieved by whisking the butter and eggs. It is said to have been invented to commemorate the 1800 siege of French forces at Genoa, when the city's inhabitants survived largely on almonds. However, despite this it is not actually of Italian origin but French, and was invented in the 1840s by Parisian pastry chef Fauvel, who worked at the Chiboust pastry shop. Fauvel initially called it gateau d'ambroise (lit. 'ambrosia cake').

== See also ==
- Genoise cake, a light sponge cake
- Genoa cake, a rich fruit cake
