= Pan di Spagna =

Type of sponge cake

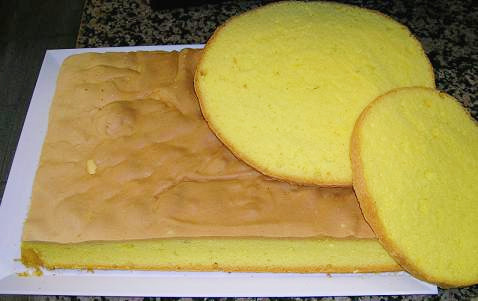
- Pan di Spagna
- Type: Sponge cake
- Place of origin: Italy
- Region or state: Genoa → Liguria
- Main ingredients: flour, sugar & eggs
- Other information: Diffusion: Europe & United States

The Pan di Spagna is a sponge cake extremely soft and spongy sweet pastry that is very commonly used in pastry making, usually used to be filled inside and outside to create cakes.

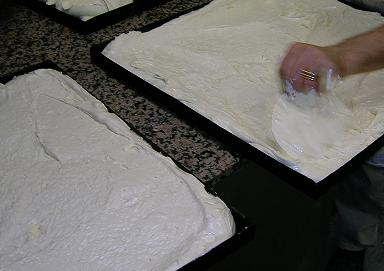
Pan di Spagna, raw.

== History ==
The first cakes made with flour, eggs, and sugar spread throughout Europe starting in the late sixteenth century, when sugar, produced primarily in the European colonies in the Caribbean, began to become accessible to a large portion of the population. These cakes, however, were thin and crispy, similar to biscuits, and often made with flours other than wheat, which was expensive at the time.

In the seventeenth century, it was discovered that beating egg whites with sugar produced a softer batter. In the eighteenth century, the technique of beating whole eggs with sugar in a double boiler was introduced, achieving greater volume and enriching recipes with flavors such as vanilla and cocoa. In the nineteenth century, with the invention of baking powder, it became possible to add butter and prepare lighter and fluffier cakes.

Tradition has it that around the mid-eighteenth century, the Republic of Genoa, having maritime trade relations with other states including, as is well known, Spain, France, and Portugal, probably sent an ambassador to the court of Madrid to the King of Spain.

The ambassador in question was the Marquis Domenico Pallavicini, scion of the wealthy Pallavicino family of the same name, who remained in Madrid from 1747 to 1749. Upon his departure, Domenico Pallavicini, in addition to various diplomatic advisors, took with him the staff of his household, namely a butler, cooks, porters, and so on. Among the men in Pallavicini's entourage was a young Ligurian pastry chef, Giobatta Cabona, who had already been in the service of the ambassador's family for years. During a reception in Madrid, Pallavicini commissioned him to create a dessert unlike any other.

By simply manipulating the ingredients, starting from the classic Savoy cake, Cabona created a beaten dough of extreme lightness; Once the dessert was tasted, the amazement and enthusiasm at the Spanish court were so great that it was deemed necessary to name this marvel of lightness with the name Génoise cake. From this, moreover, a slightly simplified version was derived which took the name of Pan di Spagna to honour the Spanish court which had imported the successful preparation.

== Comparison with Genoise cake ==
The Genoise masa is prepared hot, and the Pan di Spagna masa is prepared cold.

"Genoise" or Genoese cake is prepared hot by mixing the ingredients in a bowl with the bottom resting in a pan of gently simmering water. By repeatedly beating the ingredients with a whisk or whisk, they become frothy due to the heat effect on the eggs. The mixture is then baked in the oven to take its final shape.

The "Pan di Spagna" batter, on the other hand, is prepared cold by mixing in a bowl a little flour or potato starch, sugar, egg yolks and egg whites beaten until stiff.

In both cases (Genoise and Pan di Spagna), the cake is spongy and fluffy due to the large number of eggs: older recipes, in do not call for the use of baking powder.

Both are used as the base for many desserts, such as zuppa inglese. They lend themselves well to being cut into a wide variety of shapes, which are then finished with colored icing and sugar decorations. Genoese cake is more popular in Anglo-Saxon countries, while Pan di Spagna is more popular in Italy.

== Whipped batters ==
Masse Montate is a whipping technique in which eggs trap air to produce fluffy cakes.

== See also ==
- List of Italian desserts and pastries
- Castella
- Genoise
- Pão de Ló
- Swiss roll
