= Pão de Ló =

Portuguese sponge cake

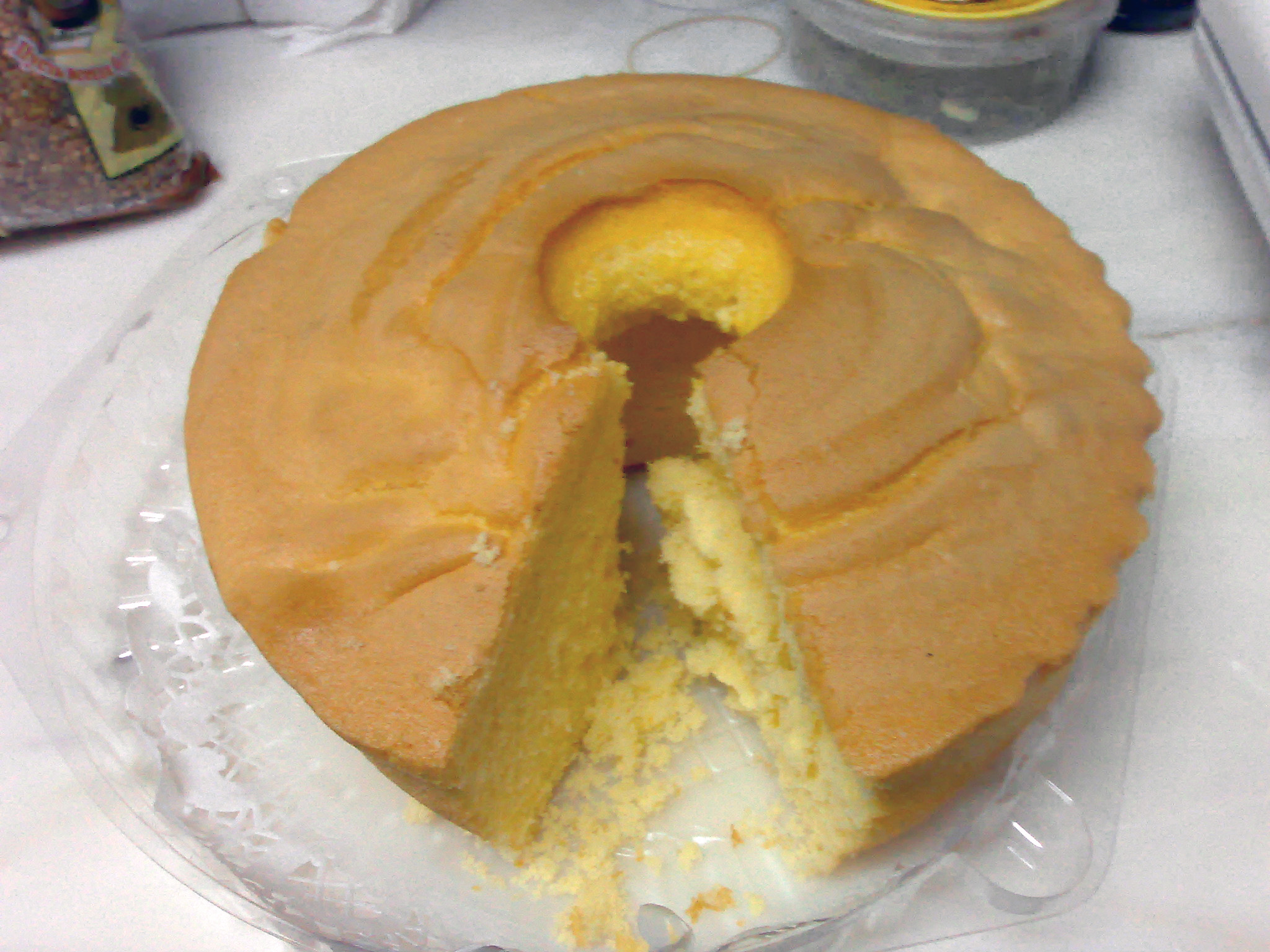
- Pão de Ló, a portuguese cake.
- Alternative names: Pão-de-Ló (pre-OA 1990)
- Type: Cake; Conventual sweet
- Course: Dessert
- Place of origin: Portugal
- Main ingredients: Eggs, sugar, wheat flour
- Variations: • de Ovar PGI • Região Centro • Região Norte • de Alfeizerão • de Margaride • de Rio Maior • Bolinhol
- Similar dishes: Biscoito da Guarda, Biscoito da Teixeira, Bolo de amendoa, Bolo real, Caladinhos, Cavacas do Marco, Cavacas de Resende, Doces de Romaria, Fatias de Freixo, Melindres, Toucinho-do-Cé

Pão de Ló (Portuguese pronunciation: [ˈpɐ̃w̃ ðɨ ˈlɔ]; plural: pães de ló) is a Portuguese sponge cake made of eggs, sugar, and wheat flour. Unlike other cakes or breads, yeast or baking powder is generally not used. Rather, to provide volume, air is suspended into the cake batter during mixing.

== Etymology ==
There are various, and some controversial, theories of where the name pão de ló is derived from. While "pão" is the conventional definition for "bread", "ló" is attributed to several theories. One suggests it is derived from the Old-French word lof meaning the "downwind side of a ship, where the sails are rigged" or "thin fabric, like cheesecloth". Another theory is that it is from the term for wool, Portuguese: lã. Author Maria de Lourdes Modesto suggests that its named in honor after of a confectioner's husband whose surname was "Ló", in Magaride, Felgueiras. Another further specifies he was a German man with the last name "Lot".

Luís da Câmara Cascudo a Brazilian lexicographer noted that in history, this sponge cake has been spelled as "pam-de-ló", "pandeló", and "pão-de-lot". In the Portuguese Language Orthographic Agreement of 1990, "pão de ló" was spelled without hyphens as acknowledged by the Terminology Coordination Unit of the European Parliament (TermCoord), although it continues to be written both as "pão-de-ló" and "pão de ló".

== History ==
=== 1500s to early 1600s ===
The first record of pão de ló, written as "pãoo de llo", was indicated in the manuscripts of Infanta Maria of Portugal in the mid-1500s. (Note: Maria moved to Italy to become the Duchess of Parma, after marrying Alexander Farnese, Duke of Parma. She brought along with her recipes from Portugal. In 1895, the original manuscripts were discovered at the Vittorio Emanuele National Library in Naples. The collection would be published into a cookbook known as Livro de Cozinha da Infanta D. Maria in 1967 by the University of Coimbra.) Unlike the pão de ló seen today, it was a thick pudding made solely with ground almonds instead of wheat flour. (Note: Almonds and sugar were both introduced by the Moors during their occupation of the Iberian Peninsula. Marzipan was consumed only among royalty, nobility, and clergy.)

=== Late 1600s to 1800s ===
In 1693, Domingos Rodrigues, head chef to the Portuguese royal family, would reproduce the same eggless and flourless formula in his recipe book known as Arte de Cozinha (lit. 'Art of Cooking').

The version of pão de ló known today existed at least by 1773. The pão de ló was "made of the finest flour, sugar, eggs, and orange-flower-water, well beaten together, and then baked", according to the Dictionary of the Portuguese and English Languages by Anthony Vieyra (edited by J.P. Aillaud) printed in 1813. (Note: The 1813 edition indicates that the first dictionary was first published in 1773.)

It was in 1780, in the book Cozinheiro Moderno, ou Nova Arte de Cozinha (lit. 'Modern Cook or the New Art of Cooking') by Lucas Rigaud, chef to Maria I of Portugal, that pão de ló is defined also as bolo de Saboia (lit. 'Savoy cake'). This same recipe reappears in the 1836 edition of Arte de Cozinha by Domingos Rodrigues. Arte de Cozinha (ed. 1836) had also indicated other derivatives such as pão de ló fofo (lit. 'fluffy bread'), pão de ló torrado (lit. 'toasted bread'), pão de ló de amêndoas (lit. 'almond bread'), and pão de ló de pistache (lit. 'pistachio bread').

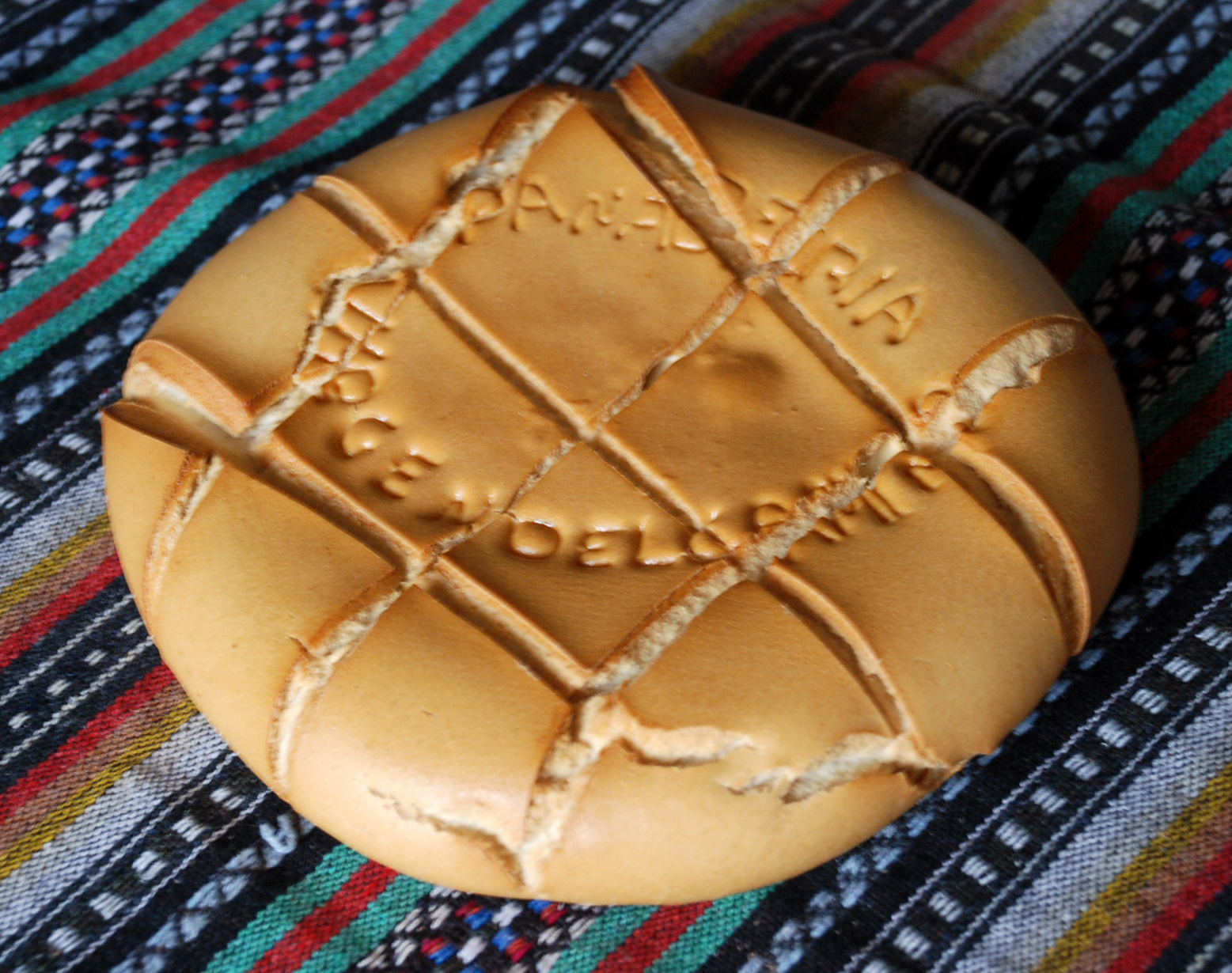
Pan candeal, is a type of white bread, a Spanish bread that predecessor to the pão de ló.

=== Spanish, French and Italian roots ===
Another similar cake related to pão de ló from the Iberian Peninsula is the Spanish bizcocho. Bizcocho (English: biscuit) is a baked confectionery whose etymology comes from "to bake twice". The Thesaurus of Castilian or Spanish Language published in 1611 stated that there was also "delicious dish made with flour, eggs and sugar".

It took root in Portugal as bolo de Castela (lit. 'cake of Castile'). In Arte de Cozihna, it appears as biscoytos de la Reyna (lit. 'biscuits of the queen'). It was likely referring to the Castilian Catherine of Austria, Queen of Portugal, who brought this confectionery to Portugal. An actual loaf from Castile that continues to exist today is Pan Candeal. It is believed that the Marranos, Portuguese crypto-Jews (Sephardic), enriched this bread with eggs to create pan d'Espana. (Note: Similar to pão doce, cf. Portuguese sweet bread.) One popular story recounts an Italian pastry chef named Giovan Battista Cabona who accompanied the ambassador of Genoa on a trip to Spain during the Renaissance period. He presented this cake to the King of Spain and named it pan di Spagna (lit. 'Spanish bread').

As the name suggest, it can be derived from the French Pain de lof, a similar kind of bread already existing in Middle Ages. A similar product is the Gâteau de Savoie, a traditional baked sponge cake from Savoie. In the Portuguese cookbook Arte do Cosinheiro e do Copeiro, similarities between pão de ló and Gâteau de Savoie (bolo de Saboia in the text) were already noticed.

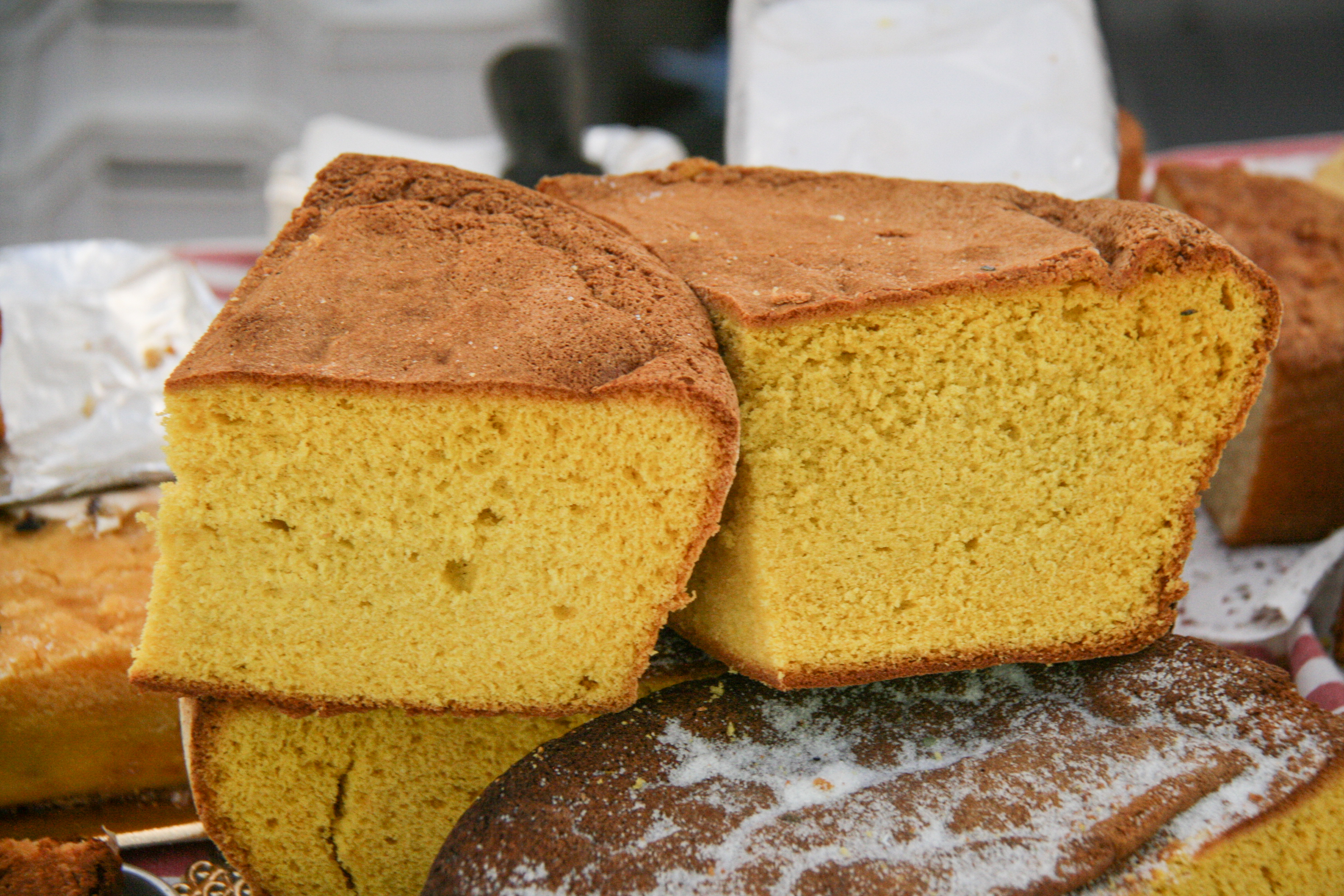
Bizcocho, Spanish sponge cake and predecessors to the pão de ló.

=== Conventual sweets ===
Monastic cooking was well established throughout Europe by the late Middle Ages which had expertise in viticulture, cheese making, and confectionery. It was here that the nuns kept alive the Moorish confections. Pão de Ló was one of the conventual sweets produced throughout Portugal by the nuns living in the convents. It is characteristic of many other of the conventual sweets containing a considerable amount of egg yolks and sugar, (Note: The elemental ingredient was sugar, which was both very expensive and rare. However, in the mid-1400s, sugar became more accessible and affordable with the exploitation of sugarcane in Brazil. There were palatial sweets but those were primarily made with honey and would be later adopted in the convents with a newer recipes. Portugal became the principal supplier of sugar to the West.) (Note: The surplus of egg yolks was a byproduct. Egg whites were used as a form of clothing starch, for the making of communion wafers, and fining in the clarification process of making wine and fruit preserve.) and very little wheat flour. There are several of these sweets containing these ingredients in varying amounts or cooking methods. There are also a few traditional confectionaries that resemble pão de ló such as cavacas do Marco and fatias de Freixo. A few others that are similar to the dried biscuit such as caladinhos and melindres. Cakes were associated with religious feast days, such as Easter and Christmas. Some cakes were formed in the shape of the crown of Jesus. After the Dissolution of the monasteries in Portugal in 1834, some of the recipes made its way to the laity.

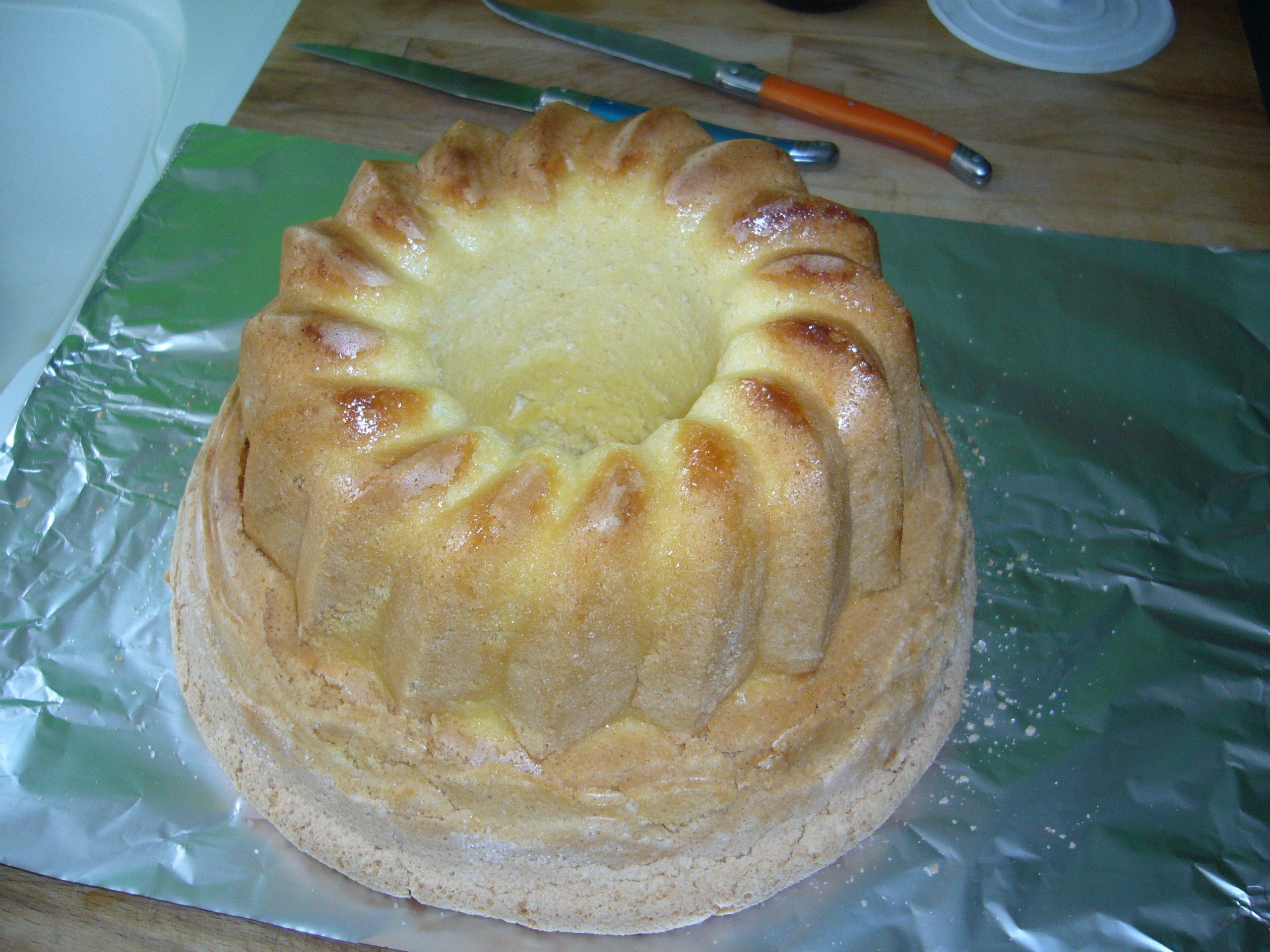
Gâteau de Savoie resembles the modern day sponge cake

=== Culture ===
Historically, some varieties of pão de ló required beating eggs manually for more than an hour in order to obtain the desired "leavened" consistency, and typically this job was often reserved to women before the mid 1900s. Mothers passed the recipes to their daughters before marriage and sold their breads and other baked goods out of their homes.

As such, these cakes were expensive and reserved for festive occasions, such as Easter and birthdays, sometimes filled with custard, fruit preserve, or fios de ovos. The rich, who were able to consume it year-round, was especially favored by those who lost their teeth and were unable to chew regular bread. It was sometimes browned in an oven, recalling its "twice baked" derivative.

It was traditionally offered wrapped in black satin to the sick and to families in mourning. It was also offered to those about to face execution.

Pão de Ló became the precursor to pão doce and other Portuguese sweet breads. The tedious labor of mixing by hand for more than an hour that often coincided with making pão de ló would be achieved by the use of yeast instead.

== Varieties ==
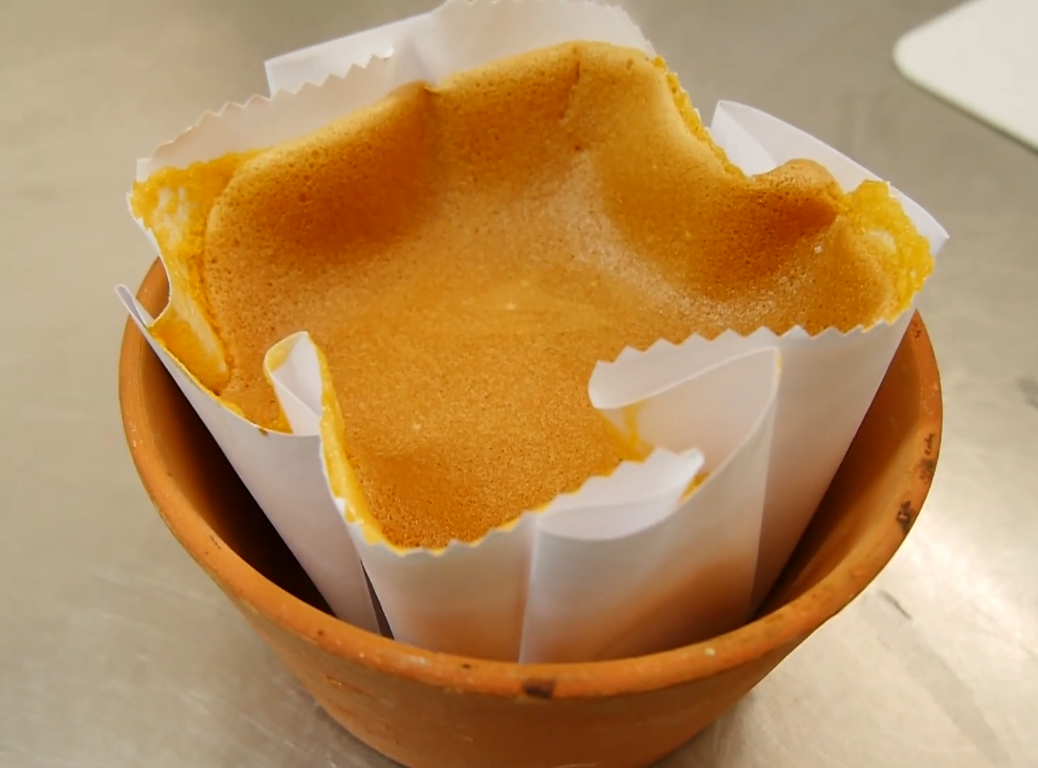
Pão de Ló de Ovar are baked in paper molds.

Seven pão de ló varieties were classified as traditional products by the Directorate-General for Agriculture and Rural Development (DGARD), a Portuguese government agency under the Ministry of Agriculture that collaborates with the Portuguese Federation of Gastronomic Confraternities (FPCG). The FPCG provides information for the inventory of traditional Portuguese recipes and products found throughout the country.

=== Pão de Ló de Ovar ===
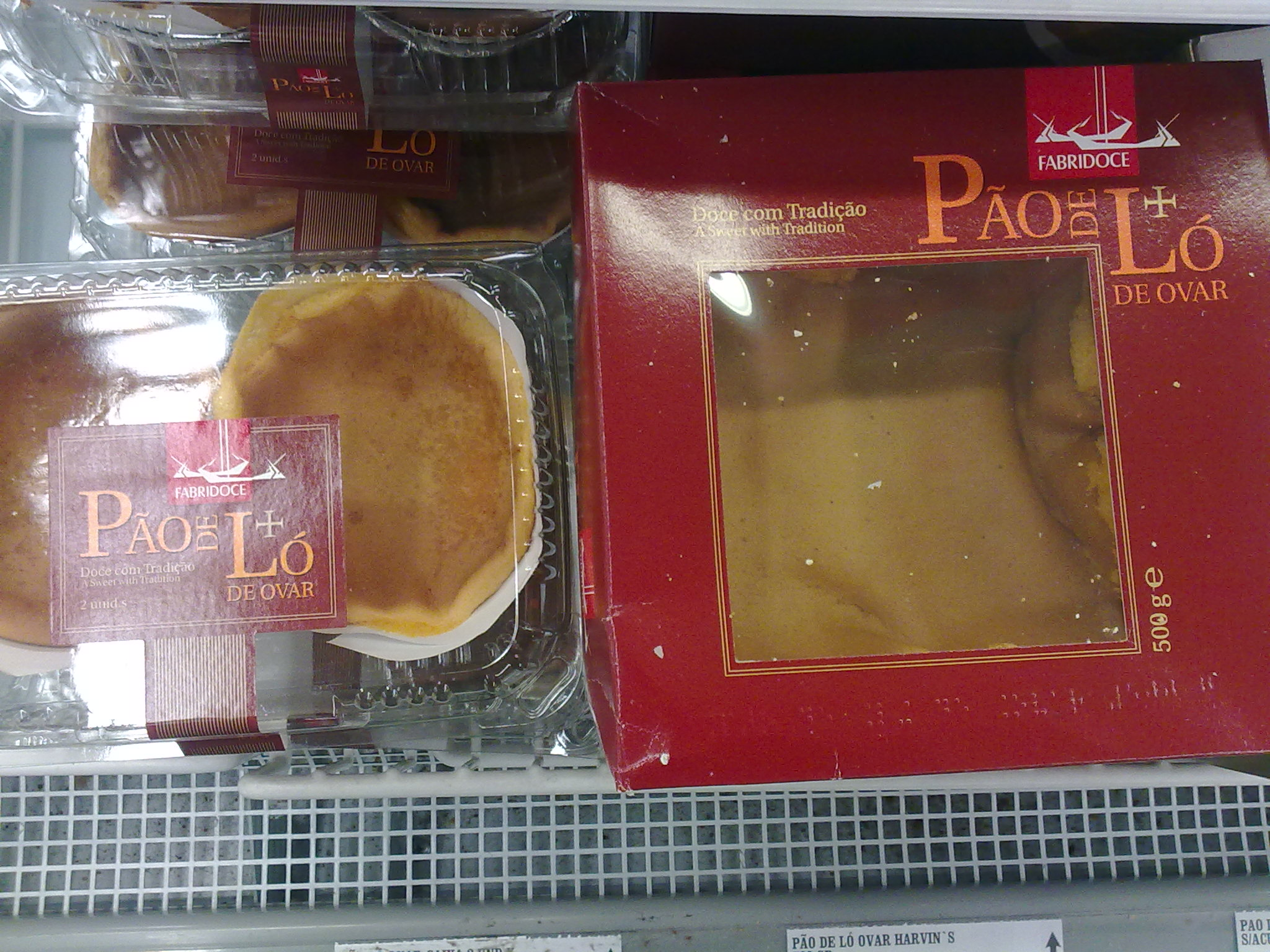
Pão de Ló de Ovar in packaging.

The origins of this artisanal North Region sponge cake began in the late 18th century. It was first recorded in the book Irmandade dos Passos in 1781, describing it as a cake gifted to clergy who carried the statues used in procession during Semana Santa.

It is made with a substantial amount of egg yolks and sugar that are beaten for an extended time, for more than an hour by hand, with a small ratio of flour added. The cake is typically baked in a terracotta vessel lined with almaço paper molds. The very moist interior is characteristic of ló known as pito.

In 2016, pão de ló traditionally made in its peculiar method within the municipality of Ovar was awarded the Protected Geographical Indication.

=== Pão de Ló (Região Centro) ===
In Vagos of the Central Region, pão de ló is a sponge cake generally made with whole eggs, flour, sugar, salt and orange (or lemon zest). The egg whites and yolks are sometimes separated and beaten individually before combining. Baking powder is sometimes added, depending on the quality of the flour being used. This ring-shaped cake is not commercially made.

=== Pão de Ló (Região Norte) ===
In the North Region, Portugal between Douro and the Tâmega river, pão-de-ló is made with primarily with whole eggs, sugar, and flour. The batter is mixed by hand for more than 10 minutes, then poured into paper-lined clay vessels that are preheated. The ring-shaped cake is baked in a wood-fired oven.

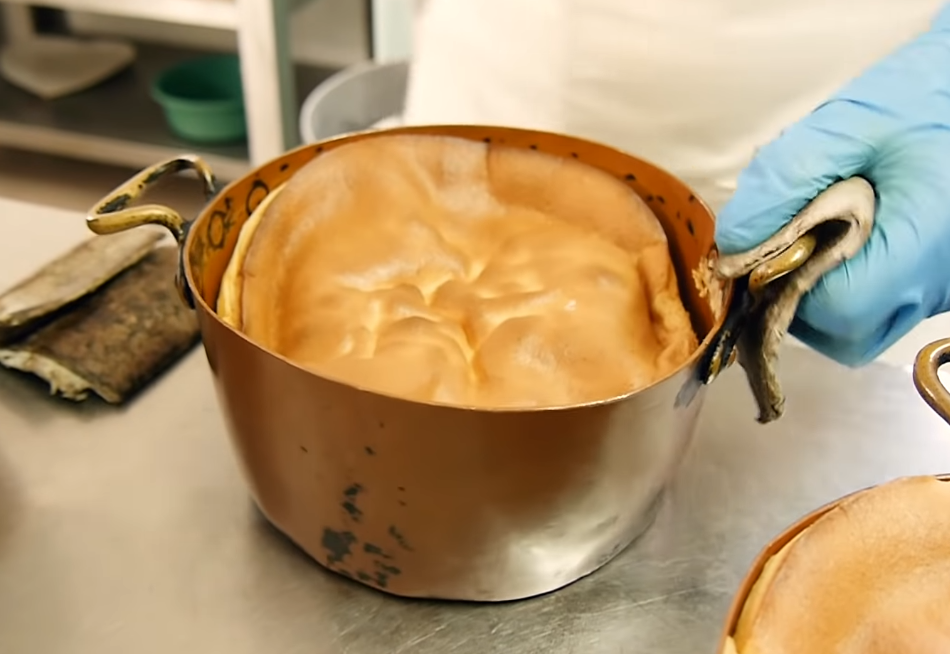
Pão de Ló de Alfeizerão are baked in copper pots

=== Pão de Ló de Alfeizerão (do Preto) ===
This sponge cake is believed to have originated from the Mosteiro de Santa Maria de Cós in Alcobaça. The recipe was smuggled out of the monastery by João Matos Vieira, a priest, due to the Revolution of 1910 and brought to the freguesia of Alfeizerão.

The cake is mainly made with egg yolks, sugar, and flour, and aguardente. The batter is whisked for a prolonged time then poured into greased copper pots. When the cake is finished baking, it is shaped while it cools.

An "undercooked" pão de ló was inadvertently served to King Carlos I of Portugal. However, the king was impressed by the mishap and the recipe persisted.

=== Pão de Ló de Margaride ===
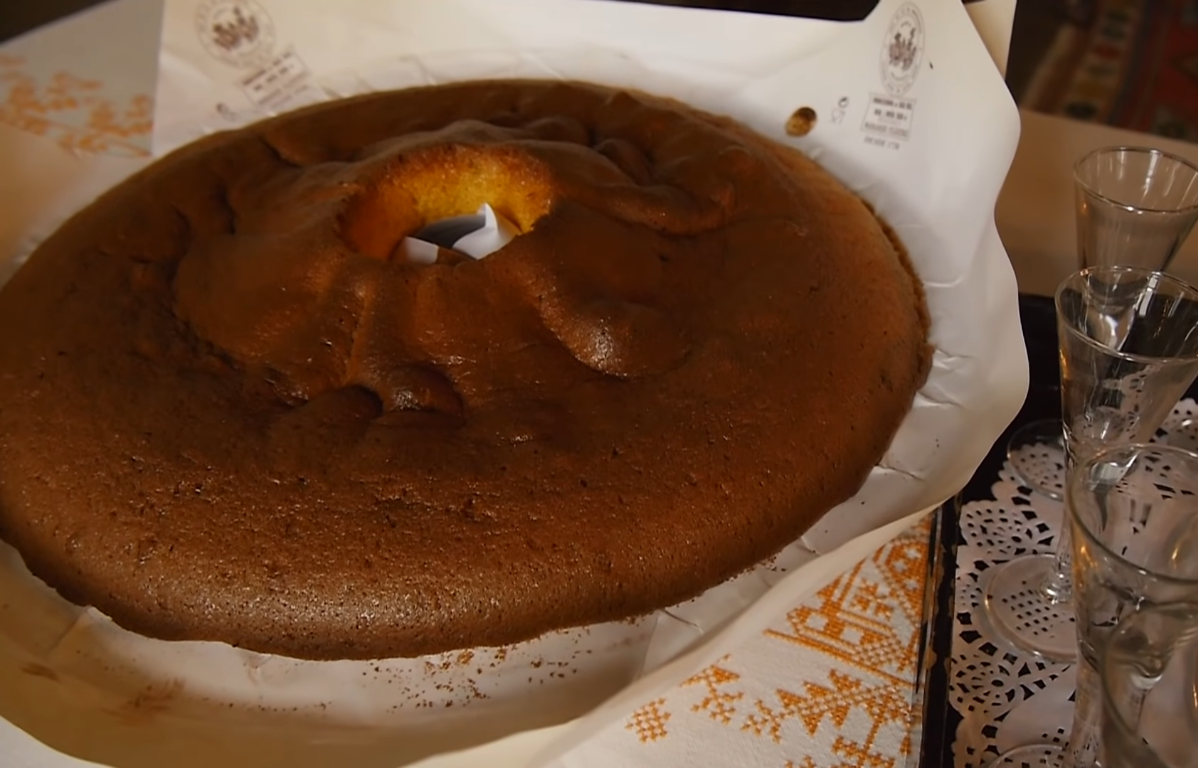
Pão de Ló de Margaride is a ring-shaped cake

Named after the freguesia of Margaride in Felgueiras, this cake was first created by a confectioner named Clara Maria. After her death in 1831, her husband's second wife, Leonor Rosa da Silva, continued making the cake.

The ring-shaped cake contains both whole eggs and additional egg yolks, sugar, and flour. The cake is baked in a paper-lined clay mold. It is sometimes eaten with queijo da Serra or port wine.

In 1888, the cake was awarded a royal warrant by the Duke of Braganza, and in 1893 by King Carlos I of Portugal which it continues to display in present times.

=== Pão de Ló de Rio Maior ===
First created in the 1960s by Maria Alice Sequeira in Lisbon, this cake contains whole eggs and egg yolks, sugar, and flour. It is typically baked in a springform pan.

=== Bolinhol (Pão-de-ló Coberto de Vizela) ===
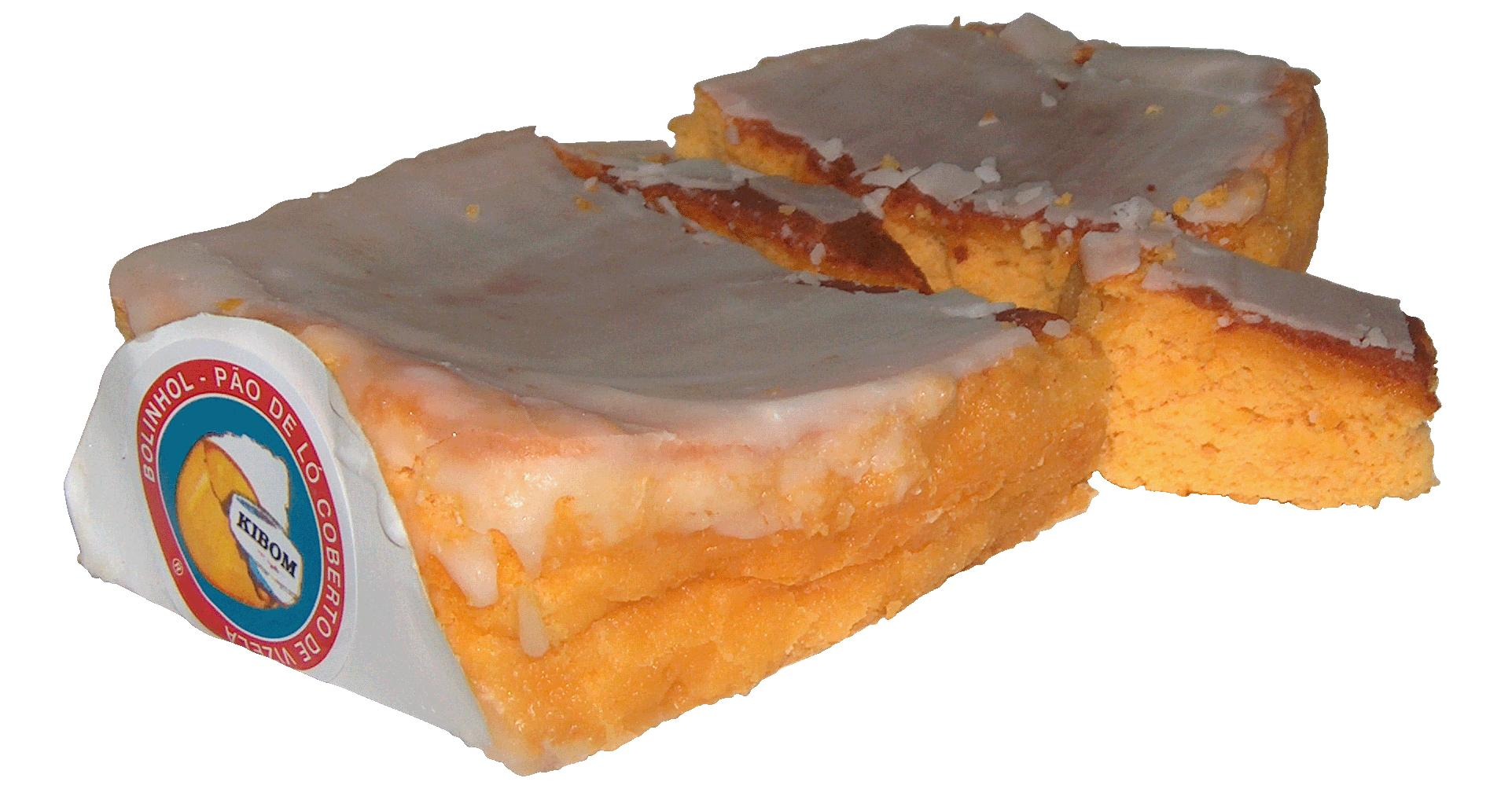
Bolinhol, a rectangular loaf with a sugar coating

The recipe is attributed to Joaquina Ferreira in the late 1800s. Typically shaped into a rectangular loaf lined with paper, this cake from Vizela is made with eggs, mainly egg yolks, sugar and flour. After baking, it is brushed with a thick layer of sugar syrup.

The name of this cake is derived from the linhol (lit. 'linen') cloths that wrapped it when it was first sold. The first known reference to this cake was in 1884, at an exhibition in Guimarães.

=== Alpiarça ===
In the municipality of Alpiarça, a very moist cake is made with a substantial amount of egg yolks and some whole eggs, sugar, and a smaller amount of flour.

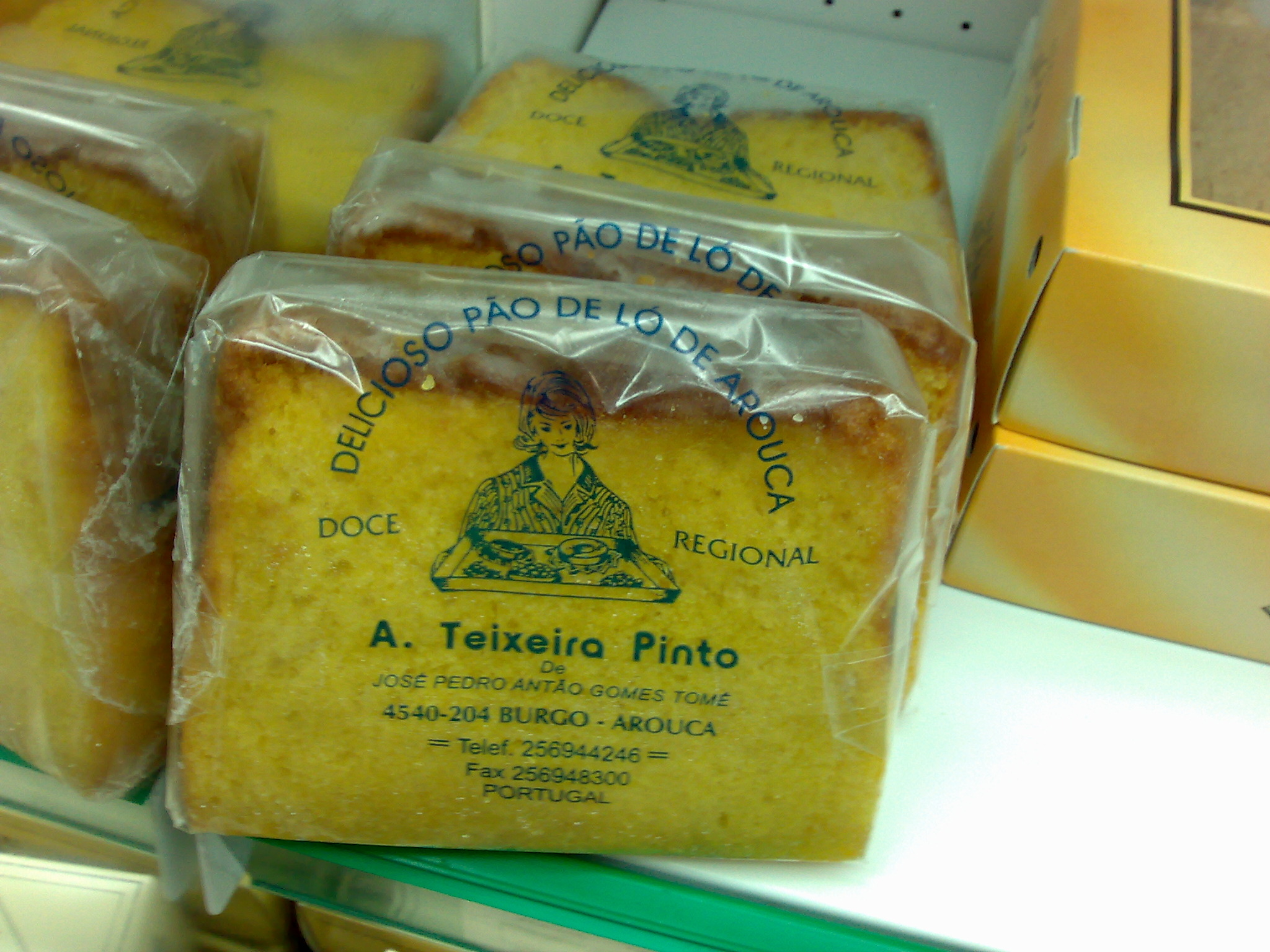
Pão de Ló de Arouca packaged in plastic wrap

=== Arouca ===
Believed to have been created by the nuns of the Mosteiro de Arouca which closed in 1886, this cake recipe survives through a bakery established in 1840 by Teixeira Pinto. The pound cake-like is baked as a rectangular loaf with whole eggs, sugar, and flour. Once it is cooled after baking, it is infused with a sugar syrup which also leaves a sugar crust.

=== Coimbra ===
This is a smaller cake that can be made at home. Whole eggs are used, but the whites and yolks are processed separately. The yolks (with sugar added) and egg whites are beaten until stiff, then combined along with flour. The batter is poured into a greased cake tube pan to bake. Baking powder is sometimes used as leaven. Cornstarch is also used as a modern, gluten free alternative.

=== Figueiró dos Vinhos ===
Baked in a pan similar to bundt cake originating from Monastery of Saint Claire in Figueiró dos Vinhos, this cake is now made exclusively by the Santa Luzia Confectionery with the original recipe and molds dating from the late 1800s given by one of the nuns from the convent.

=== Fornelos ===
This North Region cake is believed to have been created in the early 1900s, in Fornelos, Fafe by the Freitas family. It contains eggs, sugar, and flour.

== Outside of Portugal ==
=== Brazil ===
The Portuguese introduced pão de ló to Brazil in the early 1500s. In the book Vida e Morte do Bandeirante by author Antônio de Alcântara Machado, an inventory from the mid-1600s indicates two copper basins were listed to prepare it. It was a favorite of Frei Caneca, a Brazilian Carmelite friar, politician and revolutionary, one of the leaders of the Pernambucan Revolt of 1817.

Luís da Câmara Cascudo dedicates an entry to sponge cake in the Dictionary of Brazilian Folklore underscoring the importance in the culinary tradition in Brazil.

=== Japan ===
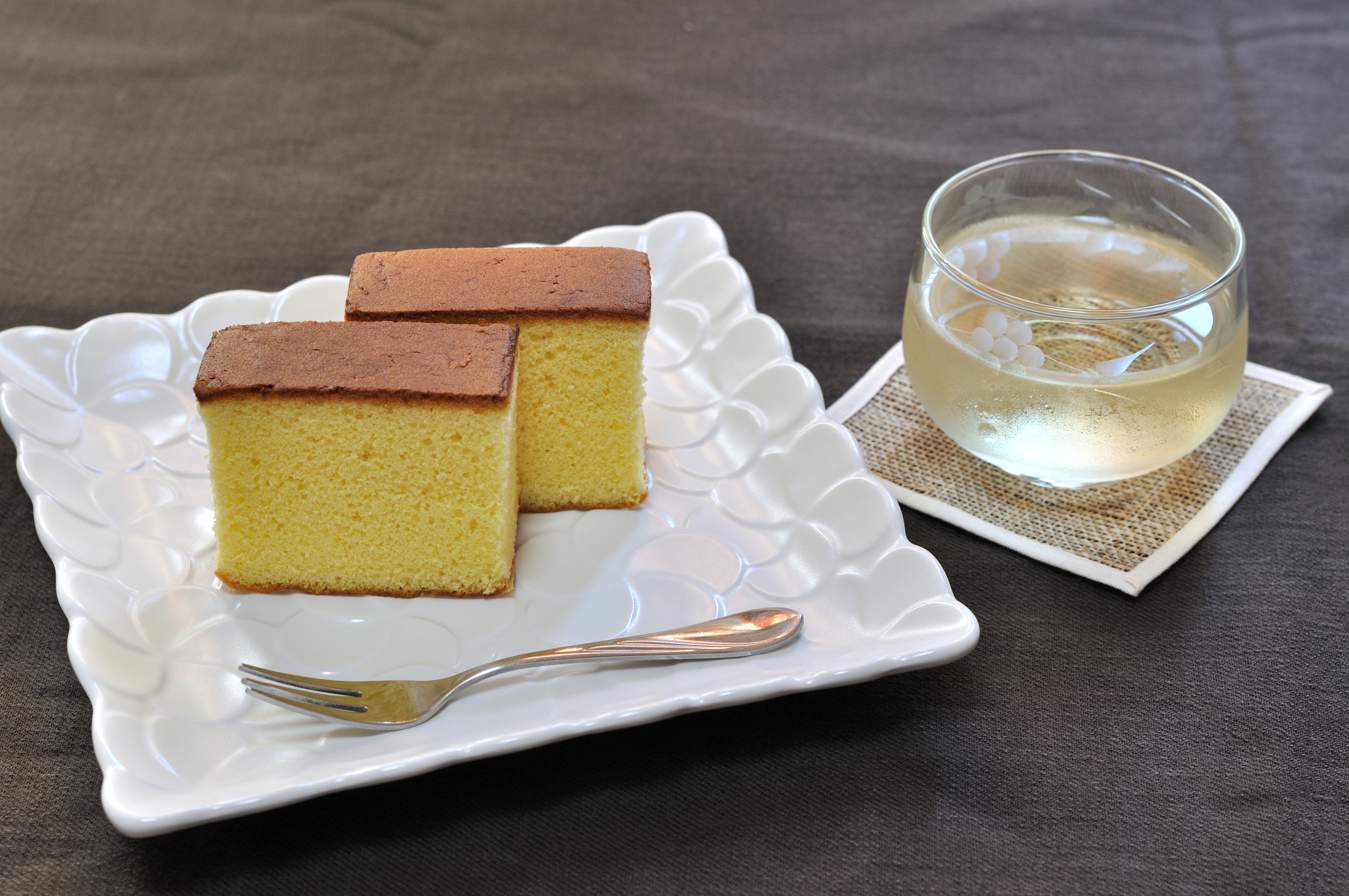
Castella found in Japan

The Portuguese would be the first European country to reach Japan in 1543. Before their expulsion from Japan in 1639, the Portuguese introduced bolo de Castela to the Japanese which would be known simply as castella (カステラ, kasutēra).

One popular belief is said that the name was derived from the Spanish, Kingdom of Castile. However, the homonymous term is believed to be from Portuguese: castile, lit. 'castle', describing the egg whites beaten until stiff akin to castle towers.

While the Spanish did arrive a few years after the Portuguese in 1549, Portuguese influence was greater than that of the Spanish especially in Nagasaki. Established in 1624, Castella Honke Fukusaya in Nagasaki is the oldest existing castella maker in Japan.

== See also ==
- Bizcocho
- Castella
- Genoise
- Pan di Spagna
- Sugee cake
- Conventual sweets
- Ladyfinger (biscuit)
- Portuguese Cuisine
- Portuguese sweet bread
