= Bizcocho =

Pastry

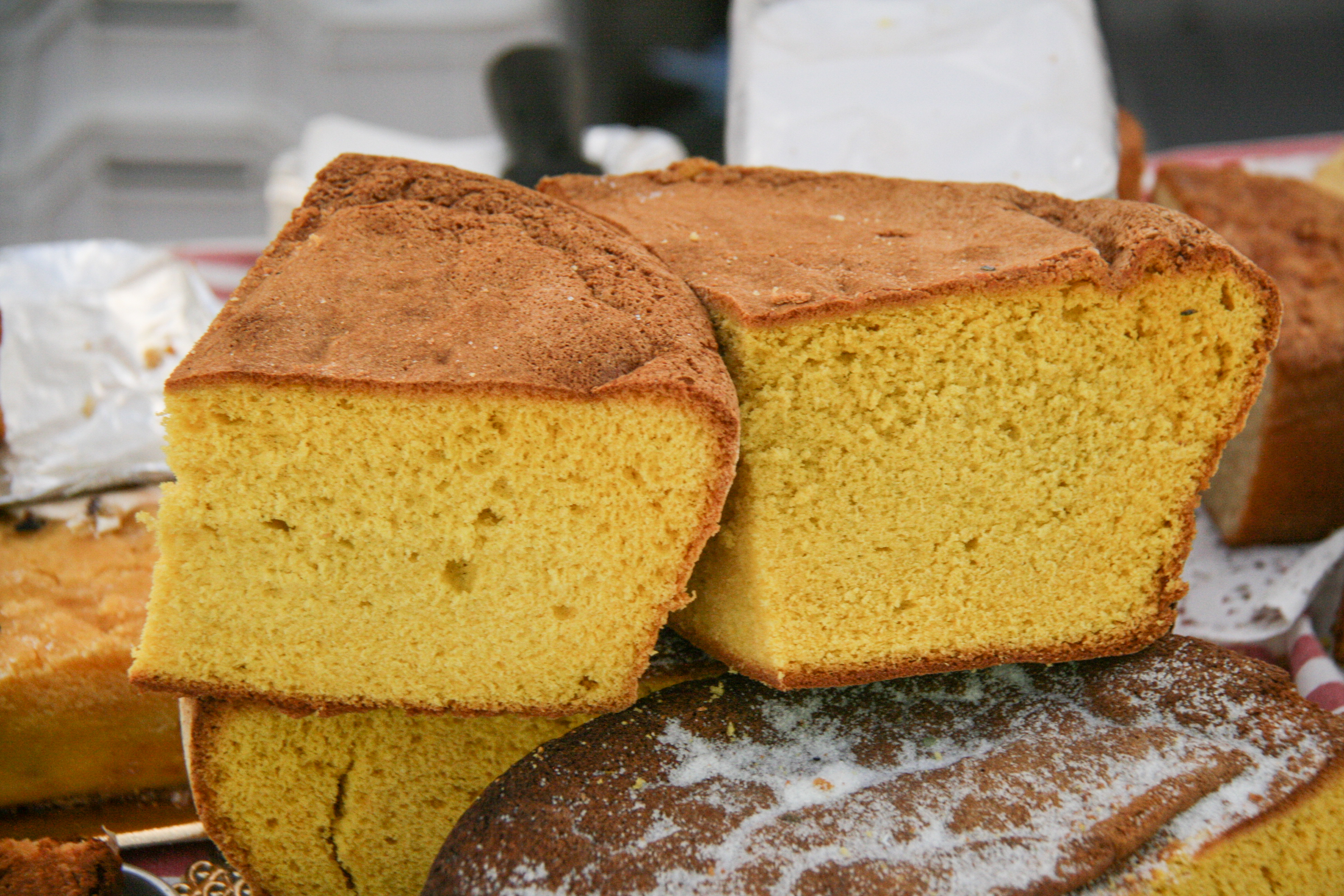
- A bizcocho from Asturias, Spain
- Alternative names: bizcocho in Uruguay factura in Argentina
- Type: Pastry, cake, cookies
- Place of origin: Global cuisine

Bizcocho (Spanish pronunciation: [biθˈkotʃo] or [bisˈkotʃo]) is the name given in Uruguay and as factura in Argentina to a wide range of pastries, cakes or cookies.

In Uruguay, most buttery flaky pastry including croissants are termed bizcocho, whilst sponge cake is called bizcochuelo.

== Generalities ==
The exact product to which the word bizcocho is applied varies widely depending on the region and country.

For instance, in Spain bizcocho is exclusively used to refer to sponge cake.

In Colombia bizcocho or bizcochuelo is used general to refer to sponge cake.

In Chile, the Dominican Republic, and Bolivia bizcocho refers to a sweet dough (masa) baked with local ingredients, similar to the bizcocho from Spain.

In Ecuador the dough of a bizcocho can either be sweet or salty.

The US state New Mexico is unusual in using the diminutive form of the name, bizcochito, as the name for a locally developed and very popular cookie.

== History ==
The word bizcocho comes from the Latin bis coctus, which means "cooked twice", that is why it was often soaked in wine, due to the low humidity it had.

The Uruguayan bizcocho is frequently related to the German pastry. It is argued that it is a derivative of krapfen, which was brought by the German immigration that went to the Río de la Plata region.

According to other versions, however, the origin of the cake would be the fusion of French and Spanish bakeries, as evidenced by the accounts of colonial Montevideo by Isidoro de María and the genealogical studies of Juan Alejandro Apolant and Ricardo Goldaracena. From these studies and publications, it appears that the first bakers in Montevideo came from France and Spain, as documented in the immigration records of the first settlers in which their profession is recorded. In fact, the puff pastry croissant, one of the varieties of bizcocho, was invented in France and its first recipe dates back to 1905.

A soft and sponge cake, usually made with flour, eggs, and sugar, that is baked in the oven. Synonyms: bizcotela, bizcochuelo.

== Types of bizcochos ==
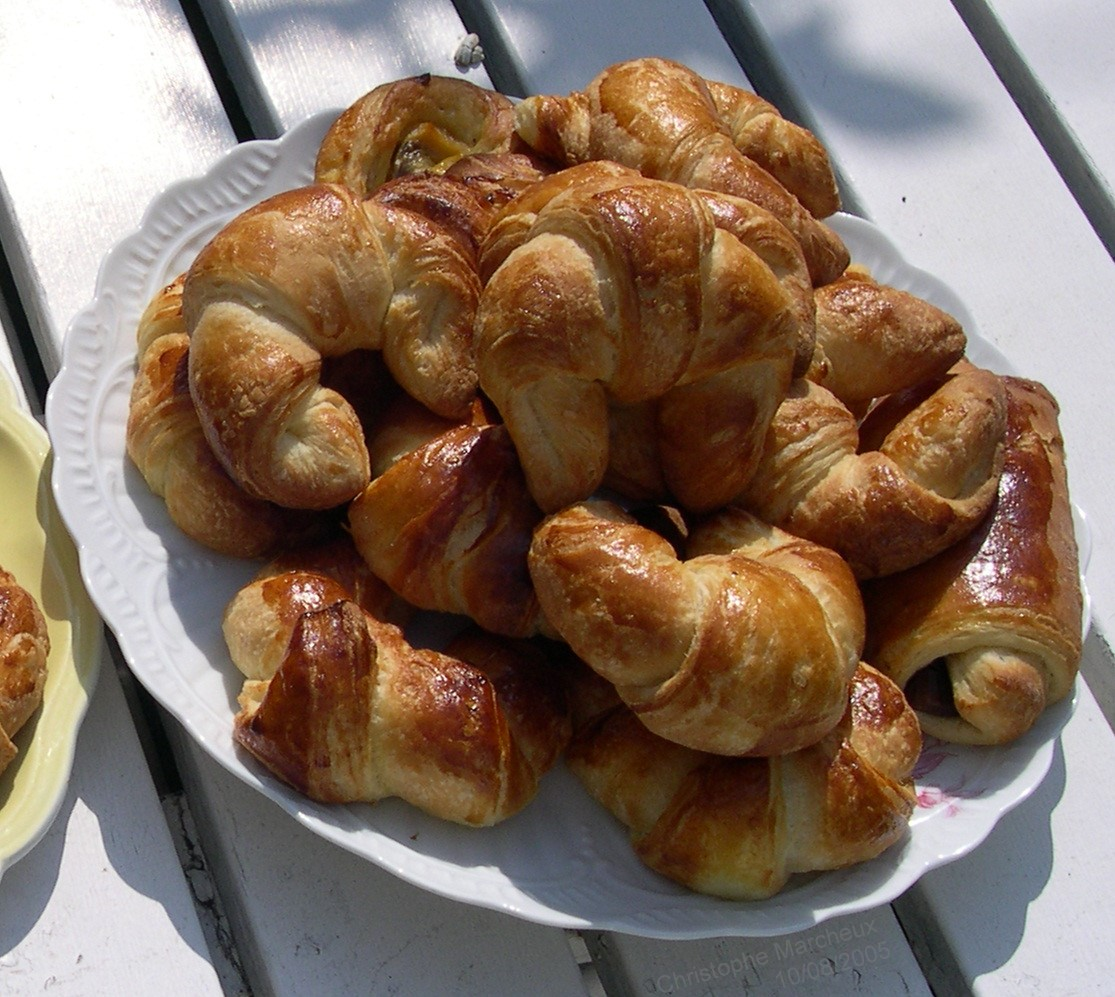
Croissants or Croasanes (as they are known in Uruguay)

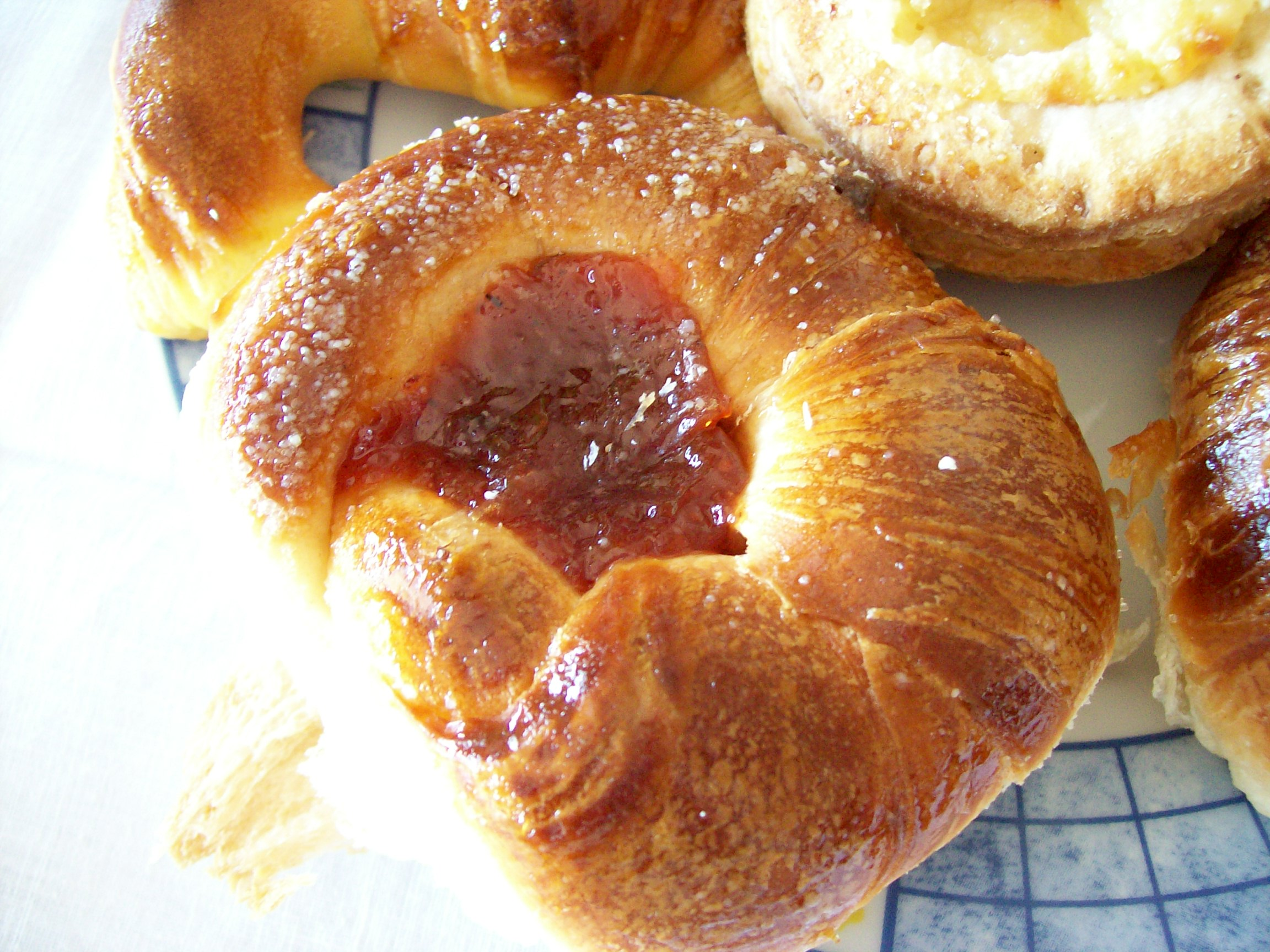
Margarita with dulce de membrillo (a sweet quince paste)

Some of the most common types of bizcochos are:

- Bizcochito: A cookie flavored with anise and cinnamon developed in the Spanish colonial province of Santa Fe de Nuevo México, roughly corresponding to the US state New Mexico in the present day.
- Bizcocho de soletilla: The name given in Spain to ladyfinger biscuits.
- Croasanes [kɾoaˈsanes] or croissants: Croissants are called bizcocho in Uruguay. Sweet croasanes can be filled with chocolate, pastry cream, dulce de membrillo (a sweet quince paste), or dulce de leche, savoury with cheese, ham or salami.
- Galletas dulces [ɡaˈʎetas ˈðulθes] or [ɡaˈʝetas ˈðulses]: A descendant of the pastry known as galleta, galleta de campaña or galleta con grasa. Galletas dulces have a layer of caramel and sugar on top and are known as bizcochos in Uruguay
- Margaritas: They are a variation of croissants found both in Uruguay and Argentina. The ends are joined together, leaving some space in the middle for a sweet filling (pastry cream, dulce de membrillo or dulce de leche). They have sugar on top of the pastry and the filling. Margaritas get their name from the flower they resemble (a daisy, known in Spanish as "margarita").
- Ojitos [oˈxitos]: A kind of round cookie with a space in the middle filled with dulce de membrillo, also from Uruguay.
- Pan con grasa: Another kind of bizcocho found in Uruguay, is a type of bread, also known as the cañón.
- Polvorones [polβoˈɾones]: Another kind of cookie that can be plain, flavoured with cocoa, or made with half plain dough and half cocoa flavoured. Polvorones originated in Spain.
- Sponge cake: Sponge cake is called bizcocho in Spain. It may be made with chocolate, lemon, yoghurt, etc.
- Vigilantes [bixiˈlantes]: Another sweet variation of croissants. They are long and thin, with sugar on top.

== By country ==
=== Argentina ===
In Argentina they call "Facturas" to pastries similar to the ones sold in Uruguay. They also have them with mate and at the moments throughout the day.

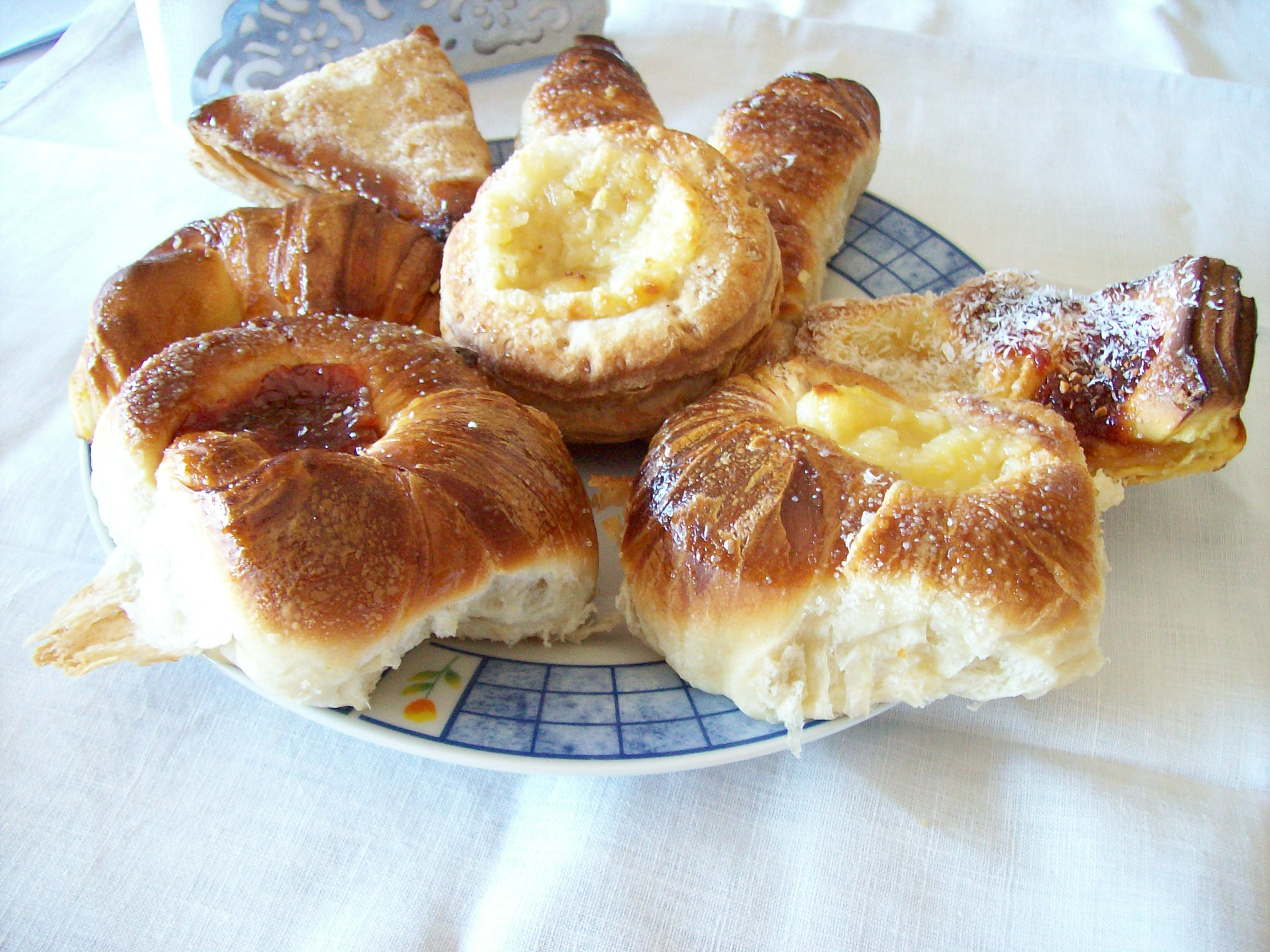
Typical pastries called "facturas" in Argentina

=== Costa Rica ===
In Costa Rica, bizcochos are made with masa, spices, and/or cheese. They are eaten as a snack, especially during coffee breaks.

=== Mexico ===
In Mexico, bizcocho is commonly used as a synonym for pan dulce. It can also be used as a flirtatious compliment to a good looking woman or, less commonly, a handsome man ("Goodbye, bizcocho!"). In some parts, however, it is a very vulgar term, referring to a person's genitals (mainly female) and not used in polite company.

=== Puerto Rico (U.S.) ===
Any type of cake, unless otherwise having a specific name (example: tres leches), is termed a bizcocho.

=== Uruguay ===
Bizcochos are one of the most intrinsic traditions of the Uruguayan culture. They are the inseparable "companions" of mate, coffee, café con leche, or tea for breakfast or the merienda (afternoon tea). They are also common in meetings with friends, especially those taking place in parks, squares, beaches or along the coastline in ramblas (an avenue bordering the coast with pedestrian areas on each side) such as the ones in Montevideo.

Bizcochos are sold not only at panaderías (bakeries), but also at specialized shops called bizcocherías.

== See also ==
- Sponge cake
- Bizcocho Dominicano
- Castella
- Pão de Ló
- List of cakes
- List of cookies
- List of pastries
- Biscocho, also spelled biskotso (Philippines)
