= Tortita negra =

Argentinian pastry

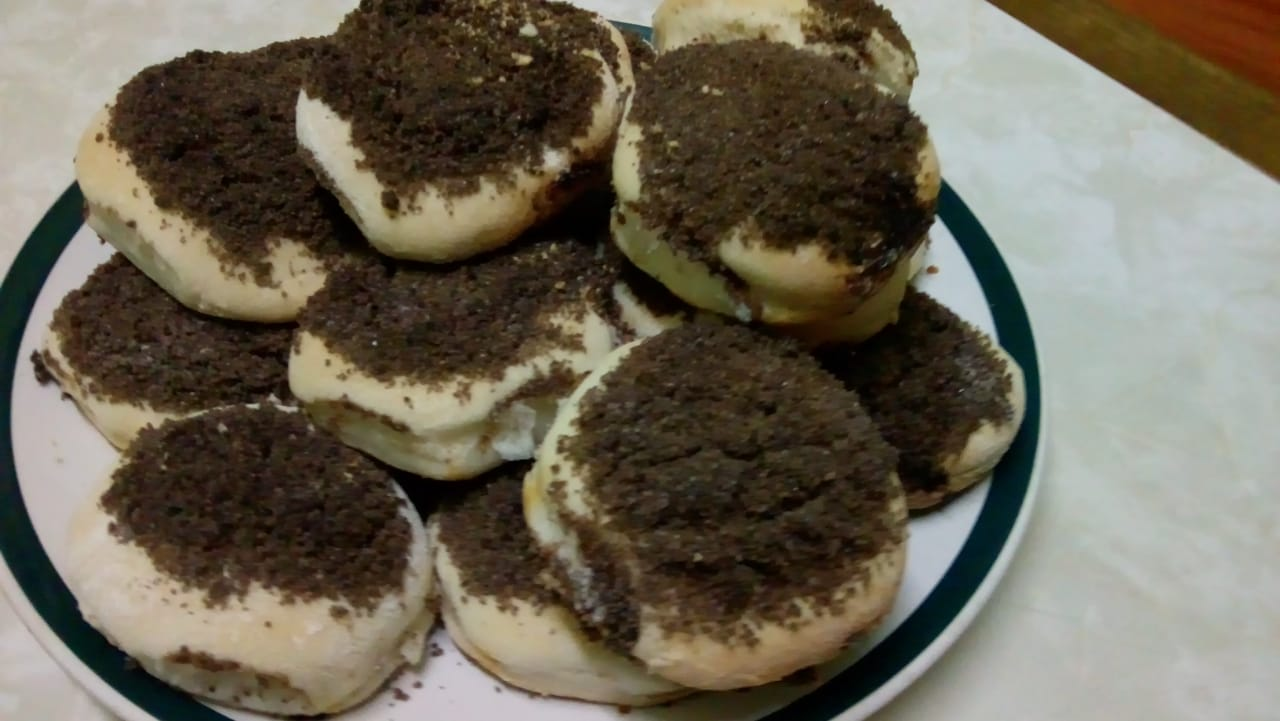
- Type: Sweet bread
- Course: Tea time or mate time
- Place of origin: Argentina
- Main ingredients: Flour, salt, butter, milk, brown sugar

Tortita negra (little black cake) is an Argentinean sweet bread which is flat at its base and round on the sides. Traditionally they have dark brown sugar on the top. They are eaten in Argentina, Colombia and Venezuela. In Argentina they are very popular amongst other facturas and are usually the perfect accompaniment to Maté in the morning or in the afternoon during ‘tea time’. They are a popular food at children's parties in Colombia.

== Recipe ==
The recipe includes flour, salt, butter, and milk, and a covering of dark brown sugar. The name comes from the natural color of the dark brown sugar.
