= Cremona (bread) =

Traditional Argentine bread

- Type: Bread
- Course: Tea time or mate time
- Place of origin: Argentina
- Main ingredients: Flour, water, salt, yeast and butter (or animal fat, or margarine)

A cremona is a traditional Argentine baked good. It is a type of bread made of crispy, flaky dough in the shape of a sun or flower. Named after the Italian municipality of the same name.

== Variations ==
Aside from traditional cremona, there are also versions filled with ham and cheese. Likewise, there are versions with olives, dried tomatoes, and olive oil.

Cremonas stuffed with dulce de membrillo, dulce de leche, and dulce de leche also exist, similar to other facturas, but sweet and sour.

== See also ==
- List of breads
- Pastafrola
