= Facturas =

Argentine sweet pastries, bread, cakes and viennoiserie

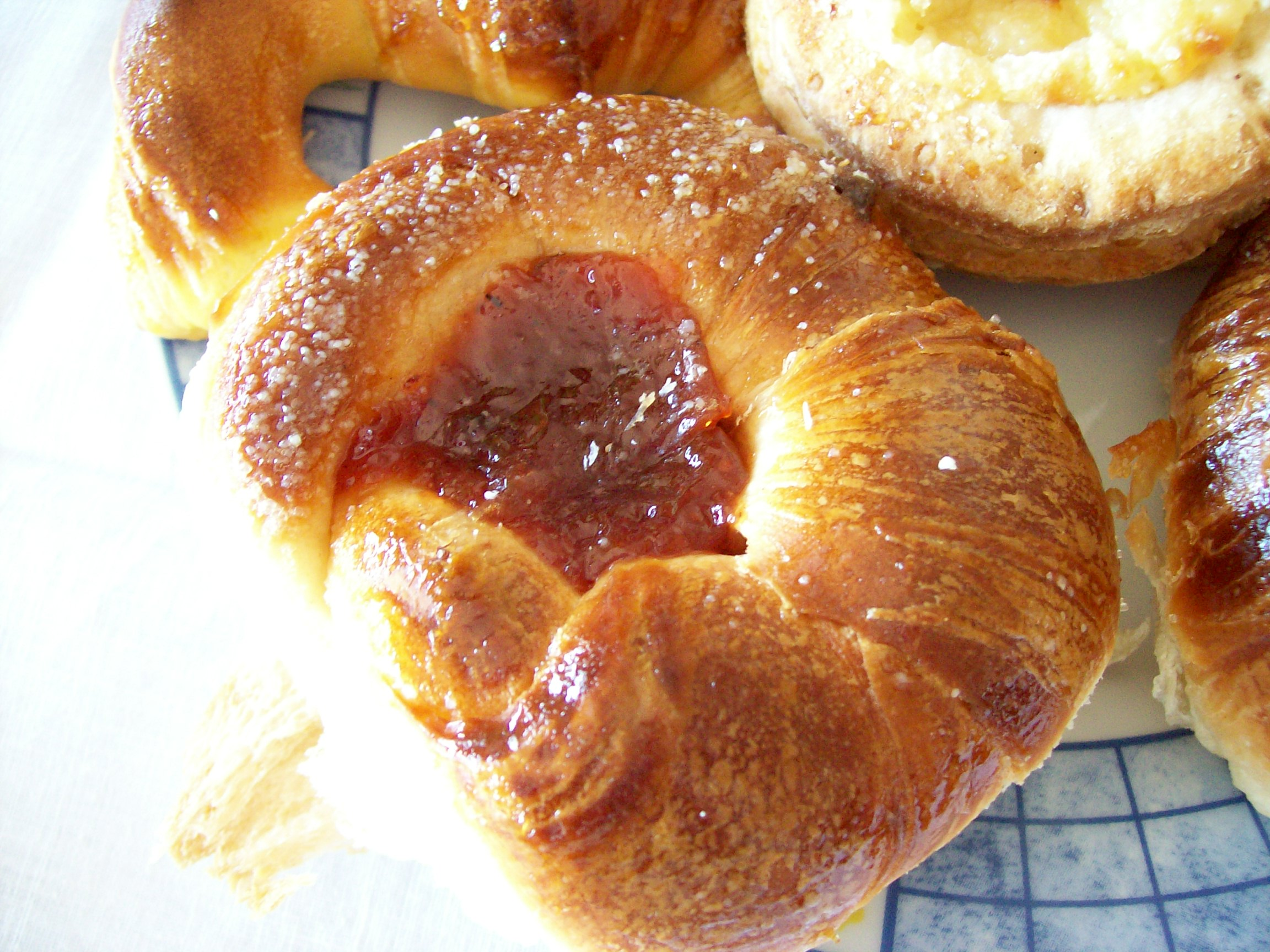
Margarita with dulce de membrillo (sweet quince paste).

Facturas (sing.: factura) is the name used in Argentina to describe any type of pastry, sweet bread, viennoiserie or cake, but also used for salty baked snacks. The different types of facturas were originally introduced by immigrants from the Italian, German and French confectionery industry.

The modern names of different facturas were created by workers around the Sociedad Cosmopolita de Resistencia y Colocación de Obreros Panaderos. Founded by anarchists Errico Malatesta and Ettore Mattei, the organisation was the first labor union of Argentina, and workers gave the facturas names to ridicule the repression against the movement and insult those in power.

In Uruguay, similar baked goods are made, known as bizcochos.

== History ==
Between 1880 and 1930, around 6 million immigrants arrived in Argentina from various countries, amongst those Italy, Spain, Germany, and Russia, but also Armenia and Syria, bringing pastry types from their home countries.

In 1887, Italian anarchists and immigrants Errico Malatesta and Ettore Mattei, founded Argentina's first union, the Sociedad Cosmopolita de Resistencia y Colocación de Obreros Panaderos, which worked with bakers. A year later, bakers and bakery workers in Buenos Aires went on strike for 15 days.

In this context, they renamed many of the existing pastries ridicule and offend the authorities. For example, the Berliner was renamed to Borlas de fraile (the "Friar's tassels") or Bolas de Fraile (the Friar's balls). While many people today are not aware of the historic connection, the name "Factura" itself includes this history. Meaning "Invoice" in Spanish, it connects the food to the value of the workers labor.

== Types ==
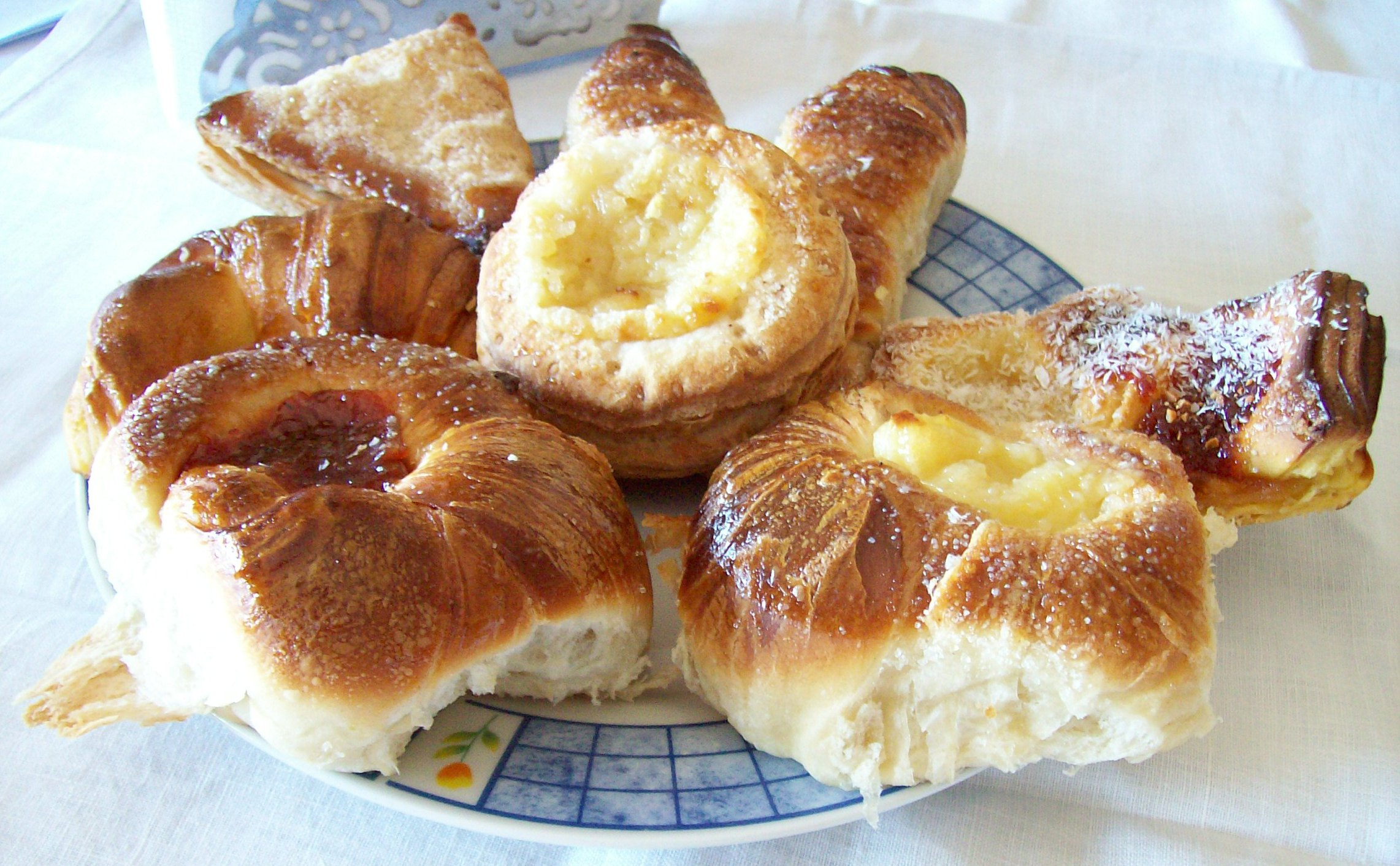
Assorted facturas on a plate.

=== Sweet ===
- Cañoncito
- Churro
- Huevo frito
- Lengüita
- Margarita
- Medialuna (of butter)
- Moñito
- Bolas de fraile/Suspiro de monja
- Pan de leche
- Pastelitos criollos
- Sacramento
- Tortita negra/Cara sucia
- Vigilante

=== Salty ===
- Cremona
- Librito
- Medialuna (of grease)

== See also ==
- List of pastries
- List of Argentine sweets and desserts
- Bizcocho
- Danish pastry
- Pan dulce
- Viennoiserie
