= Genoise =

French sponge cake named after the city of Genoa

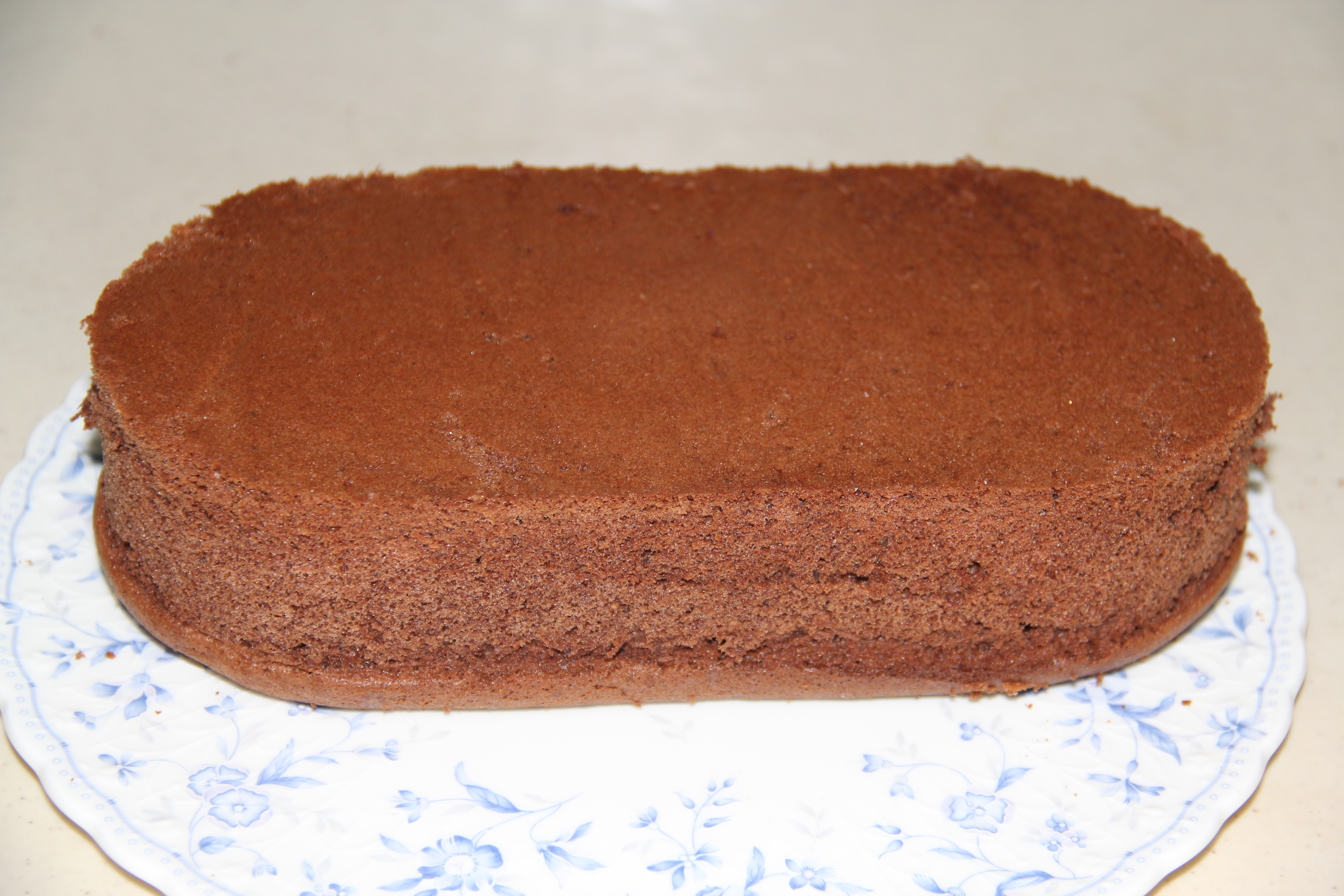
- Cocoa Génoise cake
- Alternative names: Genoese cake, Genovese cake
- Type: Sponge cake
- Place of origin: France
- Main ingredients: Flour, sugar, eggs
- Variations: Chocolate genoise

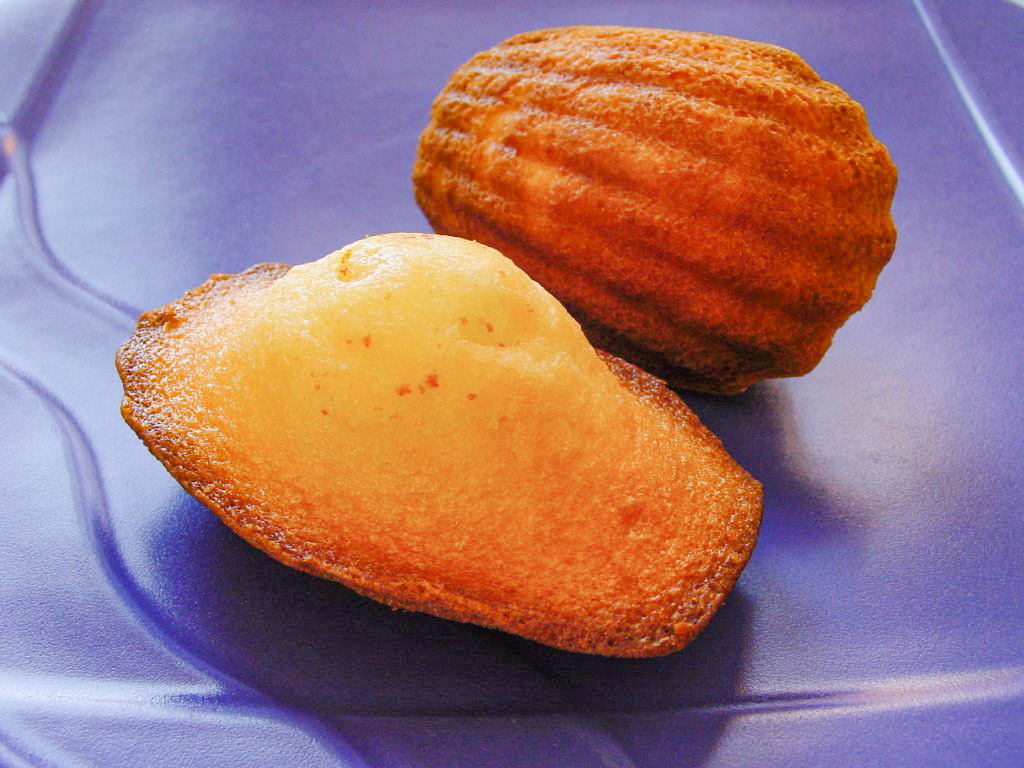
Madeleines

A génoise (US: /ʒeɪˈnwɑːz, ʒəˈ-/, UK: /dʒeɪˈ-, dʒɛˈ-/, French: [ʒenwaz]; usually spelled genoise in English), also known as Genoese cake or Genovese cake, is a French sponge cake named after the city of Genoa and associated with French cuisine. Instead of using chemical leavening, air is suspended in the batter during mixing to provide volume.

Genoise should not be confused with pain de Gênes (lit. 'Genoa bread'), which is made from almond paste, but it is similar to pan di Spagna (lit. 'Spanish bread').

It is a whole-egg cake, unlike some other sponge cakes for which yolks and whites are beaten separately, such as Pão de Ló. The eggs, and sometimes extra yolks, are beaten with sugar and heated at the same time, using a bain-marie or flame, to a stage known to patissiers as the "ribbon stage". A genoise is generally a fairly lean cake, getting most of its fat from egg yolks, but some recipes also add in melted butter before baking.

== Use and preparation ==
Genoise is a basic building block of much French pâtisserie and is used for making several different types of cake. The batter usually is baked to form a thin sheet.

When finished baking, the sheet is rolled while still warm (to make jelly rolls or bûches de Noël), or cut and stacked into multiple layers or line a mold to be filled with a frozen dessert. A variety of fillings are used, such as jelly, chocolate, fruit, pastry cream, and whipped cream. The genoise can be piped into molds to make madeleines. It is the base for Jaffa Cakes.

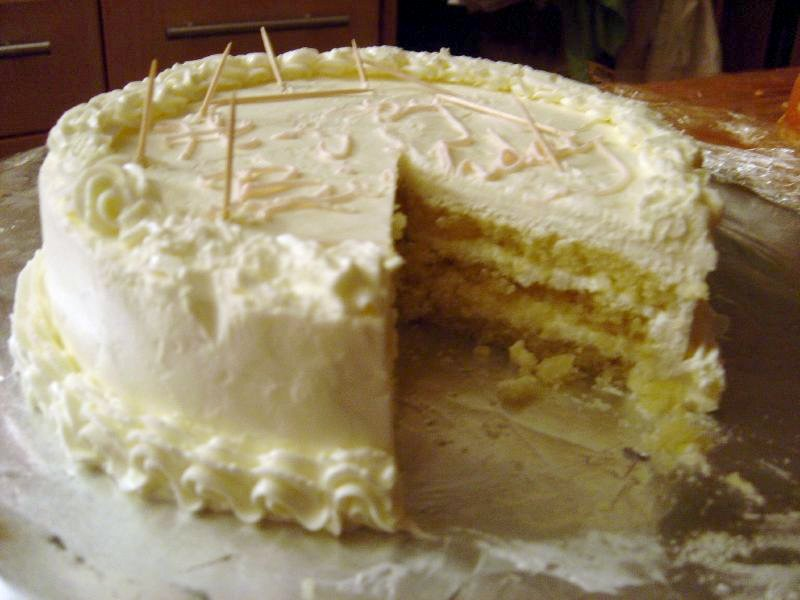
Genoise cake with buttercream frosting

The cake is notable for its elastic and somewhat dry texture and is sometimes soaked with flavored syrups or liqueurs and often served with a buttercream frosting. The popular tiramisu cake may be made with ladyfingers or a genoise sheet.

A chocolate genoise can be made by substituting cocoa powder for some of the flour, and is sometimes used as a substitute for the richer cake used in the standard Sachertorte recipe.

== See also ==
- Genoa cake
- Pão de Ló
