= Sociedad Cosmopolita de Resistencia y Colocación de Obreros Panaderos =

Bakers' trade union in Argentina

- Formation: August 4, 1887; 139 years ago
- Founder: Ettore Mattei
- Founded at: Buenos Aires
- Type: Trade union

The Sociedad Cosmopolita de Resistencia y Colocación de Obreros Panaderos (lit. 'Cosmopolitan Society for the Resistance and Placement of Bakery Workers') was a trade union for bakers in Argentina. It was founded in 1887 by Italian anarchist labor organizer Ettore Mattei.

== Establishment ==
The Sociedad Cosmopolita de Resistencia y Colocación de Obreros Panaderos was founded in Buenos Aires on August 4, 1887, by Italian anarchist labor organizer Ettore Mattei. The statutes for the union were drafted by Errico Malatesta, another Italian anarchist. It was the first bakers' union in Argentina, and the country's first society based around the principles of solidarity and resistance; members utilized direct action and the labor strike. August 4, the date of the union's establishment, was declared National Bakers' Day by the National Congress of Argentina in 1957.

== Activity ==
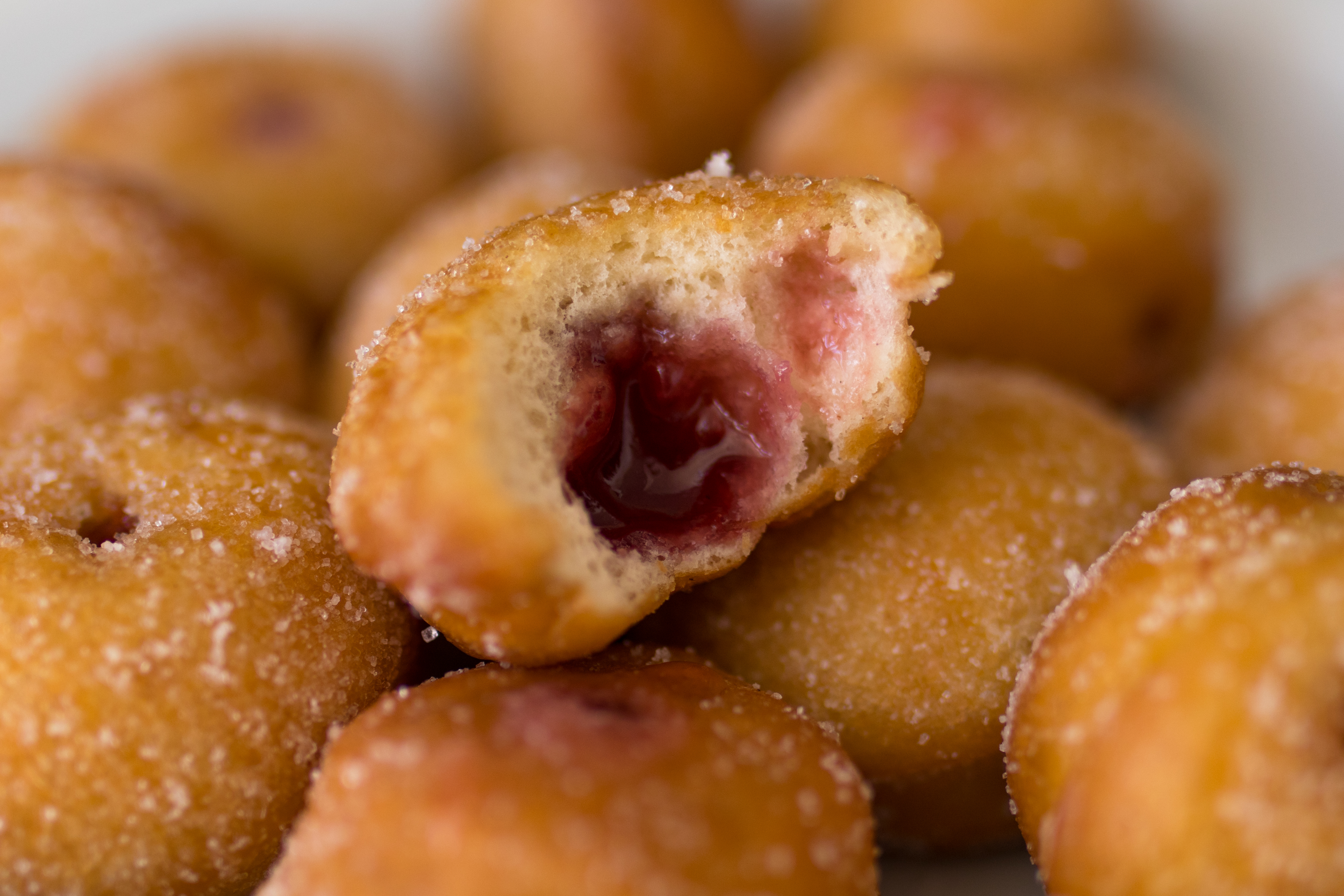
Bolas de fraile, as renamed by the union

In January 1888, less than six months after the establishment of the Sociedad Cosmopolita de Resistencia y Colocación de Obreros Panaderos, members of the union made the decision to organize a strike. Their goals were to improve working conditions; specific demands included weekly paychecks, a 30% increase in pay, elimination of night working and the provision of 1 kilogram (2.2 lb) of bread per day. The strike lasted 10 days before succeeding, and inspired the creation of other anarchist labor unions. During the strike, the anarchists in the union renamed many baked goods with names that are still in use today, often alluding to actions against the state or satirizing religion and government. Examples include the bolas de fraile (lit. 'friar's balls') and the bomba (lit. 'bomb'). Pastries overall were termed facturas (lit. 'invoices' or 'bills').

In 1901, the bakers held another strike, this time demanding daily pay in place of free meals within the bakery, as well as the addition of one worker to each baking crew. The strike, during which workers used sabotage, was completely successful.

=== El Obrero Panadero ===
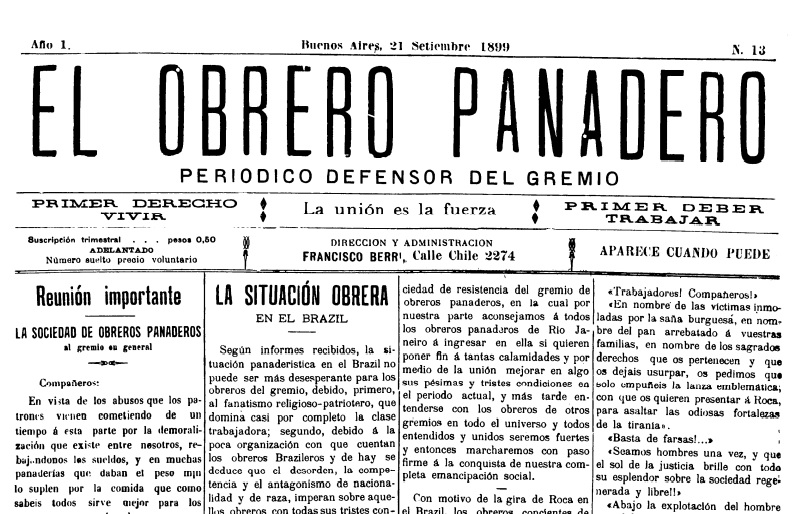
21 September 1899 issue of El Obrero Panadero

From 1894 to 1930, the union disseminated its own publication, titled El Obrero Panadero (lit. 'The Bakery Worker'). The newspaper's chief editor was the union's founder, Ettore Mattei.

== See also ==
- Anarchism in Argentina
- Argentine Regional Workers' Federation
- Anarcho-syndicalism
- General strike
