= Genoa cake =

Fruit cake from Genoa, Italy

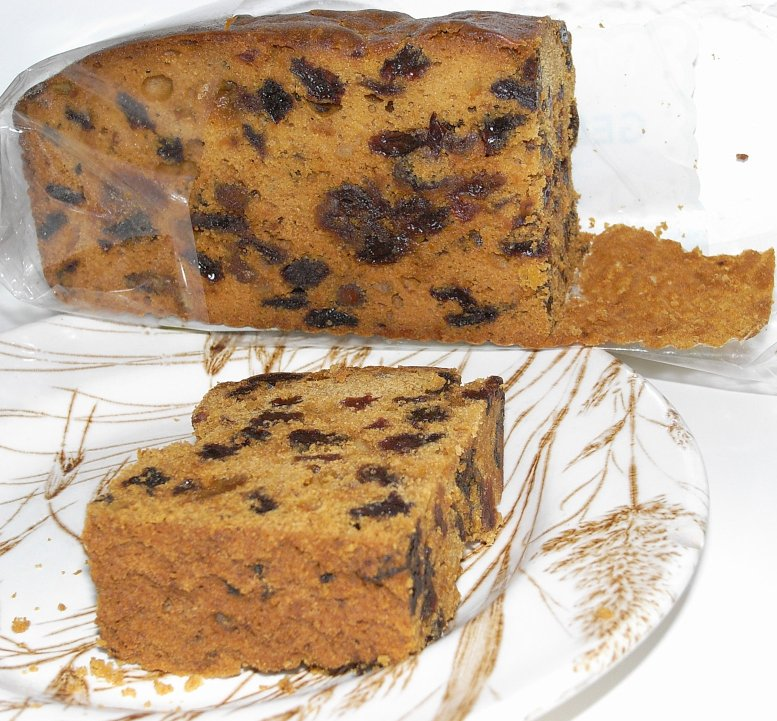
- Genoa cake (supermarket own-brand with few cherries)
- Alternative names: Pandolce, (in Italian) pandolce genovese (in Italian)
- Type: Fruit cake
- Place of origin: Italy
- Region or state: Genoa, Liguria
- Main ingredients: Sultanas/raisins or currants, glacé cherries, flour, eggs, butter, sugar
- Food energy (per 100 g serving): 340 kcal (1,400 kJ)
Nutritional value
(per 100 g serving)
- Protein: 4 g
- Fat: 9 g
- Carbohydrate: 59 g

Genoa cake, known in Italian as pandolce (Note: Pronounced [panˈdoltʃe]; Ligurian: pandoçe, pronounced [paŋˈduːse]; lit. 'sweet bread'.) or pandolce genovese, is a fruit cake consisting of sultanas (golden-coloured raisins), currants or raisins, glacé cherries, almonds, and candied orange peel or essence, cooked in a batter of flour, eggs, butter, and sugar.

== Origins ==
Although the name Genoa cake is mainly used in the United Kingdom, where recipes for it have been around since the 19th century, it is a variant of the pandolce (Italian: [panˈdoltʃe]; Ligurian: pandoçe, Ligurian: [paŋˈduːse]; lit. 'sweet bread') cake which originated in 16th century Genoa as a Christmas cake. Unlike Genoa cake, traditional pandolce includes pine nuts as a major ingredient and uses yeast as its raising agent, which requires several hours to rise, like bread. This original form is today known as pandolce alto ('deep pandolce'), whilst a simpler variant which uses baking powder is known as pandolce basso ('flat pandolce') and is essentially the same as the Genoa cake sold in the UK, with a moist but crumbly texture.

The term Genoa cake is also sometimes used to refer to two other Genoa-related cakes, neither of which are fruit cakes: Genoese cake, a light sponge cake, and pain de Gênes ('Genoa bread'), a dense almond cake.

== See also ==
Media related to Pandolce at Wikimedia Commons

- Cuisine of Liguria
- List of Italian desserts and pastries
- Genoese cake
- Pain de Gênes
