= Barriga de freira =

Portuguese egg dessert

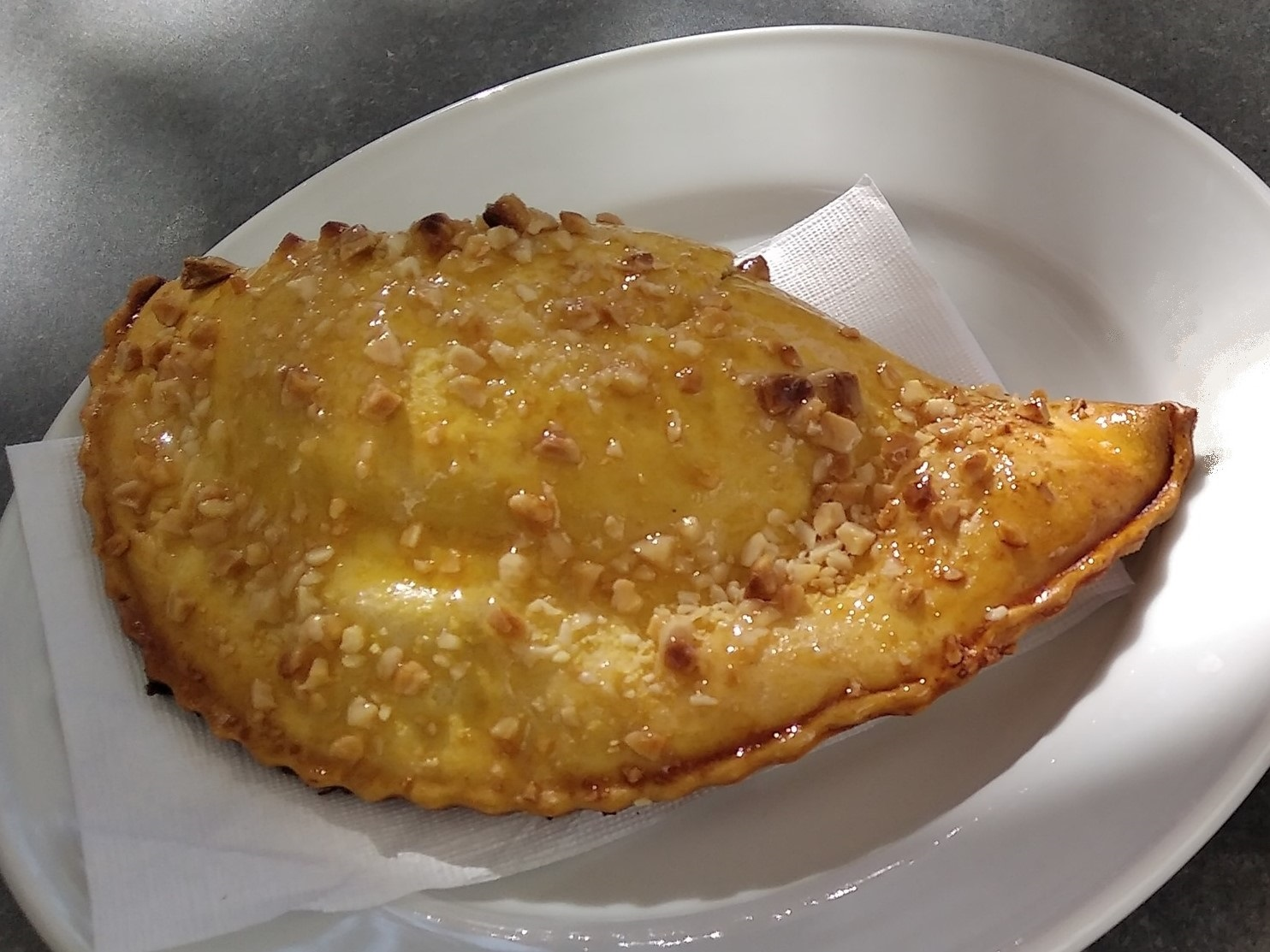
- Barriga de freira from Tentúgal
- Alternative names: Lérias
- Type: Conventual sweet Pudding
- Course: Sobremesa
- Place of origin: Portugal
- Region or state: Tentúgal, Central Region
- Main ingredients: Wheat flour, eggs, milk, sugar, almond, cinnamon
- Similar dishes: Sopa dourada

Barriga de freira (lit. 'nun's belly') is a traditional Portuguese sweet egg yolk-based pudding. The name is an idiom on the ingredients typically found in conventual sweets made by the religious sisters at convents historically―egg yolks, sugar, and almonds. Another variation of barriga de freira is served as a turnover or empanada using the same pudding for a filling.

Barriga de Freira was created as early as the 15th or 16th century in the monasteries and convents in Lisbon. The dish was first created by the nuns in the province of Beira Litoral in the 17th century.

== Preparation ==
A syrup is typically made by boiling water and sugar. It can be flavored with lemon peel or cinnamon. The syrup is poured over pieces or crumbs of bread (or pão de ló or ground almonds). Egg yolks are incorporated into the bread mixture. The pudding is cooked until the pudding is slightly thickened then garnished with multiple toppings such as butter, cinnamon, slivered or chopped almonds, silver pearls, caramel or fios de ovos, or used as a filling for a pastel.

== Variations ==
Instead of pastry, it is sometimes encased in wafer known as lérias.

In Coimbra, from the Mosteiro de Sta. Maria de Celas, the pudding is made with arrufada, a type of sweet bread from the region.

In the North Region from the Convento de Santa Mafalda contains almonds.

In Borba, it does not contain almonds and is typically topped with caramel.

In Monção, a variation of sopa dourada (lit. 'golden soup'), (Note: Soup dourada is a similar dish made with similar ingredients using pão de ló.) is known as doce de Chavo or barriga de Freira do Vaticano. Instead of bread, pão de ló is used and is garnished with candied cherries. A version from Monte do Camparrão, Portalegre is made with papo seco (or carcaças) and contains a generous amount of butter and whole eggs.

The Ursuline nuns of Vale da Mó in Anadia has a version reminiscent of encharcada that does not contain bread or almonds.

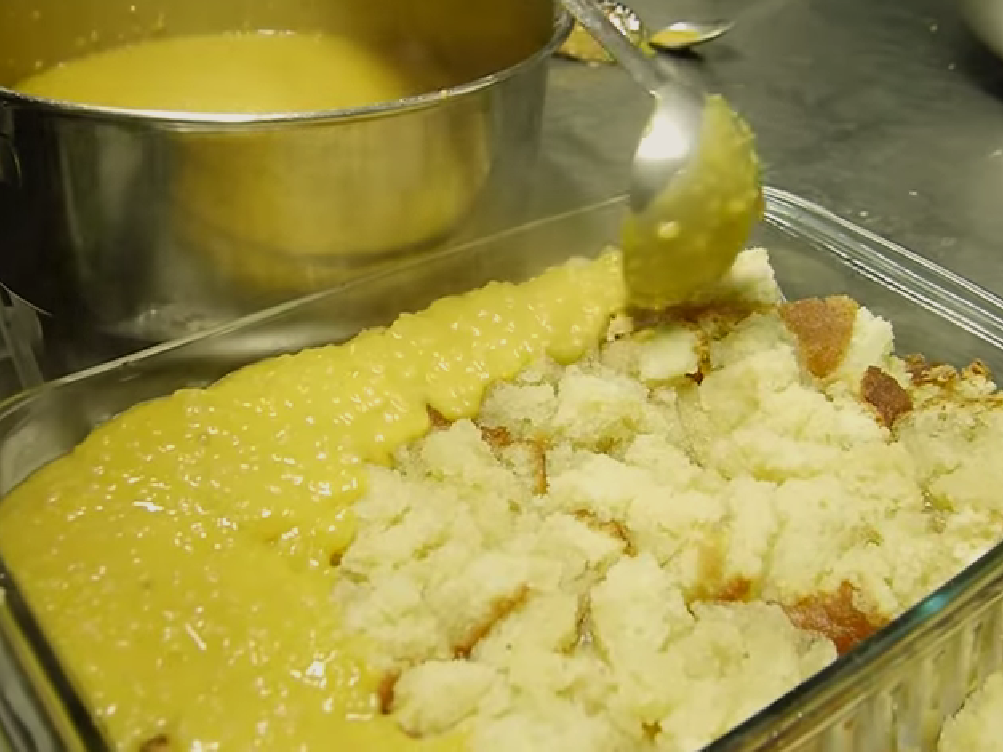
Egg mixture is poured over pieces of pão doce for the pudding variation

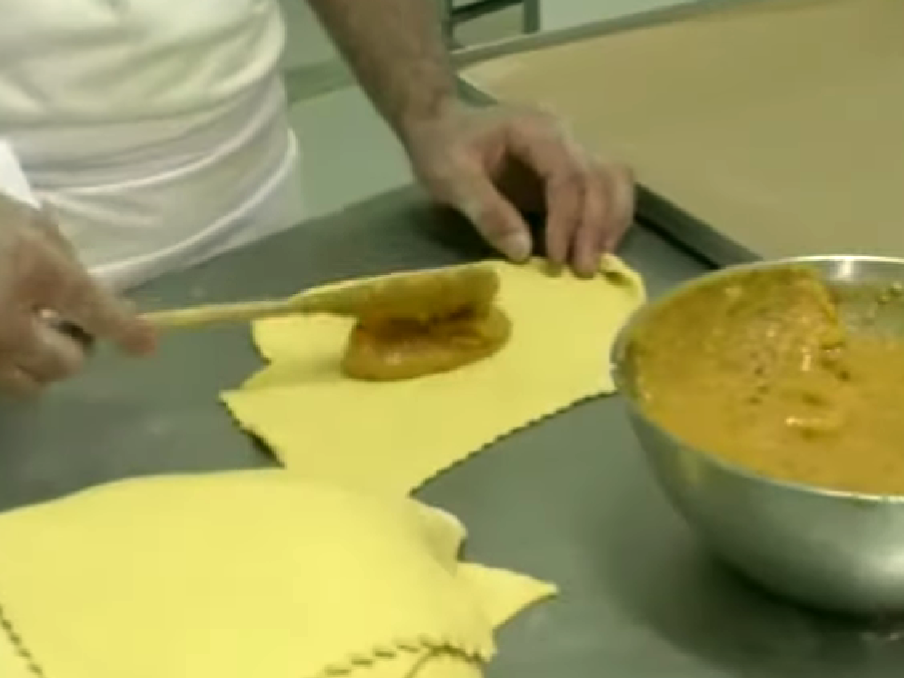
Filling being added for a pastry version

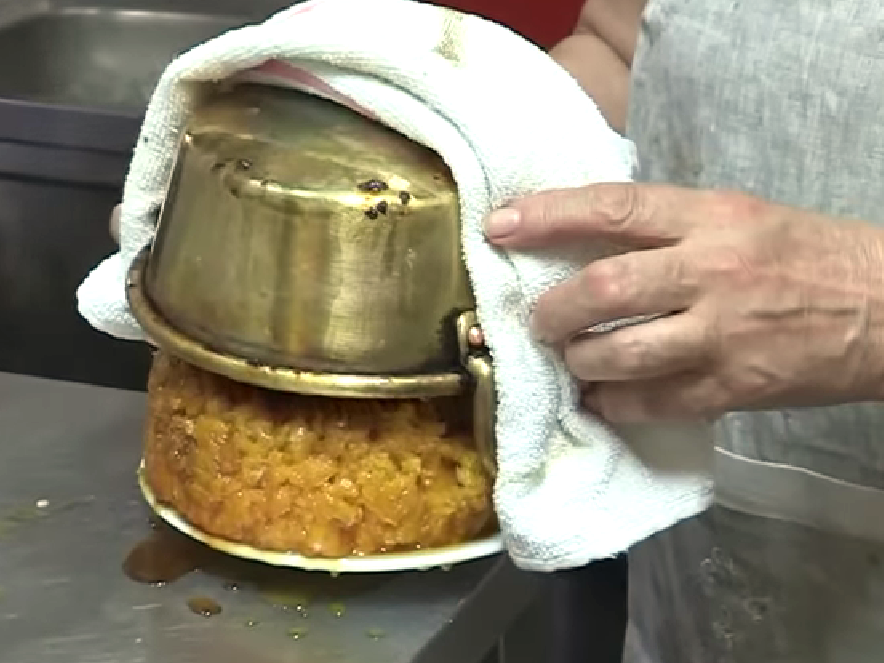
Turning over a dish for Barriga de freira de Anadia

== See also ==
- Pastel
- Portuguese Cuisine
