= Tocino de cielo =

Spanish egg dessert

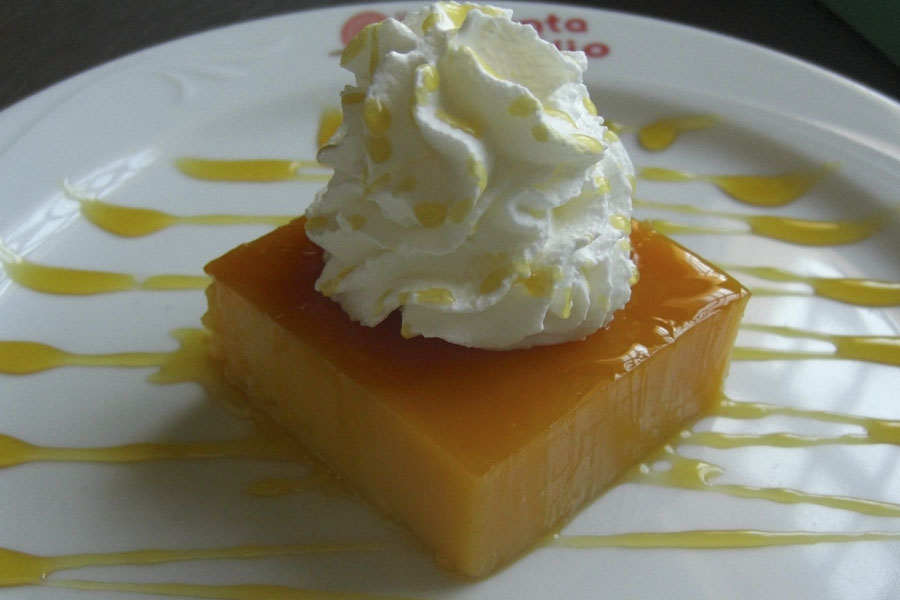
- Tocino de cielo
- Alternative names: Tocinillo de Cielo
- Type: Pudding; Conventual sweet
- Course: Dessert
- Place of origin: Spain
- Region or state: Jerez de la Frontera, Andalusia
- Created by: Convento de Espíritu Santo de Jerez de la Frontera
- Main ingredients: Egg yolks, sugar, water
- Similar dishes: Flan de huevo, Toucinho do Céu

Tocino de cielo (lit. 'heavenly bacon') is a Spanish dessert made primarily of egg yolks, sugar, and water. Unlike flan, it does not contain milk or any other dairy product.

== History ==
Tocino de cielo is a product of conventual cooking in the 14th century. It was created by the Convento de Espíritu Santo de Jerez de la Frontera (Convent of the Sacred Spirit of Jerez de la Frontera) since 1324. Characteristic of conventual sweets, it utilizes the surplus of egg yolk leftover from wine clarification. Egg whites were used as a form of clothing starch and fining in the clarification process of making wine. The name of the dessert was given due to its appearance and color akin to pork bacon or fatback.

Because the original recipe remains largely unchanged since its first inception and is considered the predecessor of flan, the local authorities have applied to designate this dish with a Protected Geographical Indication (PGI) status. This dessert is also popular in Cuba where vanilla is sometimes added.

== Preparation ==
Firstly, a caramel is made with sugar and water which is cooked until golden in color. The caramel is poured into the bottom of molds.

A simple syrup is then made with sugar and water which is used for the egg yolk mixture. The simple syrup and egg yolks are whisked carefully without incorporating air. This mixture is then poured into the caramel-lined molds and baked.

After baking, the molds are refrigerated overnight until completely chilled. The molds are flipped onto a dish to serve.

== See also ==
- Spanish Cuisine
- Toucinho do Céu is a Portuguese pastry sharing the same translation-contains ground almonds in addition to eggs and historically bacon lard or pieces
