= Conventual sweets =

Portuguese sweets

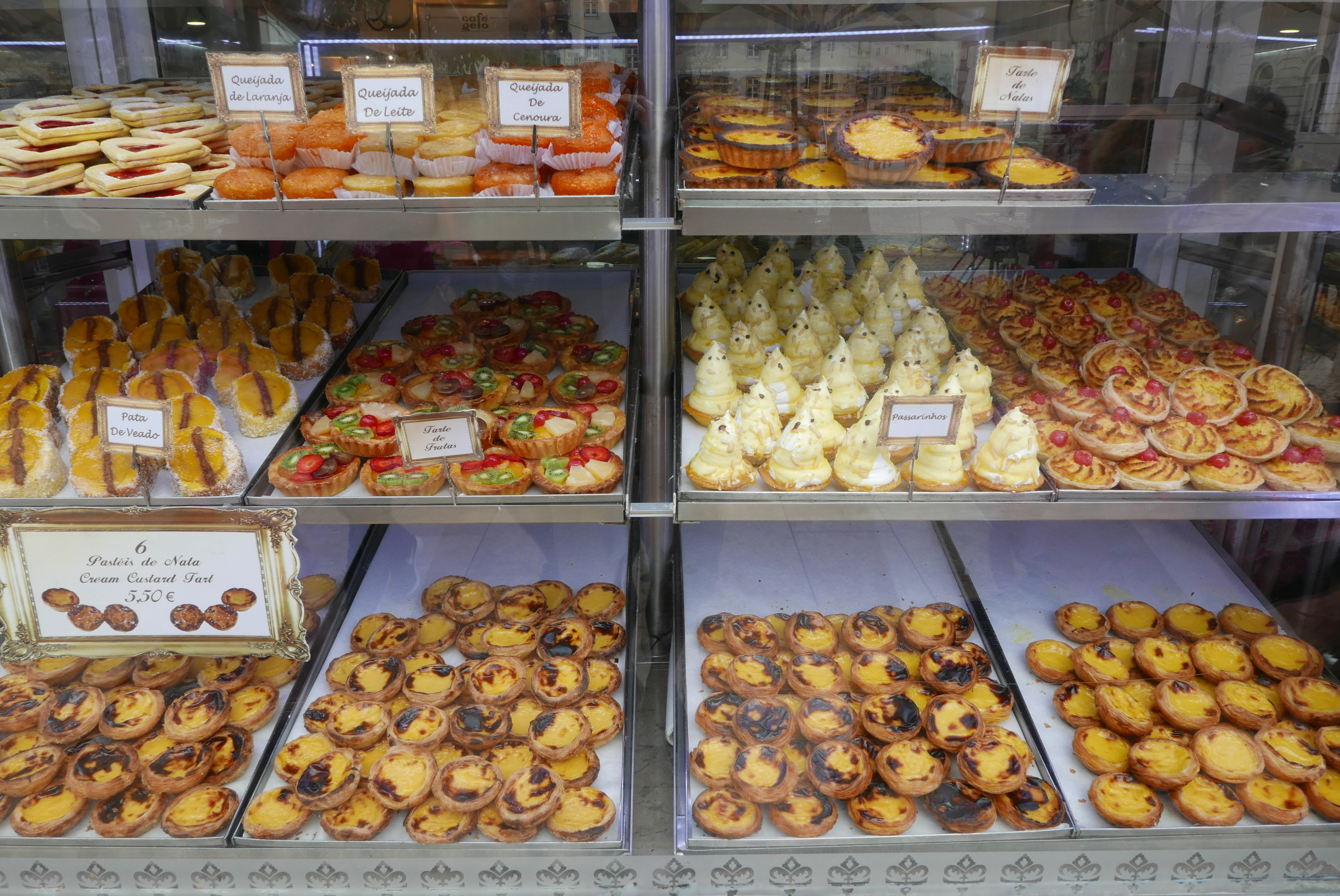
Some conventual sweets on display in a shop in Lisbon

Conventual sweets (Portuguese: doçaria conventual, Spanish: dulces conventuales, Italian: dolci conventuali) are sweet confectionery items typically made by nuns in convents and monasteries throughout countries with a strong Catholic presence, particularly Portugal, Spain and Italy, along with former colonies of these countries. A specific repertoire of unique sweets from these convents developed over the years, often becoming codified as part of the national cuisine.

== In Portugal ==
Conventual sweets (Portuguese: doçaria conventual) are a typical part of the Portuguese cuisine and a generic term to a variety of sweets in Portugal. As the name implies, conventual sweets were made by nuns who lived in the Portuguese convents and monasteries. Starting in the 15th century, these sweets have since integrated in the Portuguese cuisine and in former Portuguese colonies. Conventual sweets have sugar, egg yolks and almond as ingredients of choice.

=== History ===
Conventual sweets have always been present in the meals that were served in the convents, but only from the 15th century, with the dissemination and expansion of sugar, did they reach notoriety. Sugar cane production was tried in the Algarve, followed by Madeira in the 15th century. At the time Portugal was one of the largest egg producers in Europe and the excess amount of egg yolks was initially thrown away or given to animals as food. With the expansion of the Portuguese Empire and the large-scale arrival of sugar from the Portuguese colonies, a new destination was given to the egg yolks. From the 16th century, the art of confectionery is cultivated, with great refinement, by almost all Monasteries and Convents in the country. From the middle of the 19th century, when the extinction of Religious Orders in Portugal was decreed, nuns and monks were faced with the need to raise money for their livelihood. The sale of Conventual sweets was one of the ways found to minimize their financial situation. These recipes were then passed from generation to generation and have since integrated in the Portuguese cuisine.

=== Non-specific to a province ===
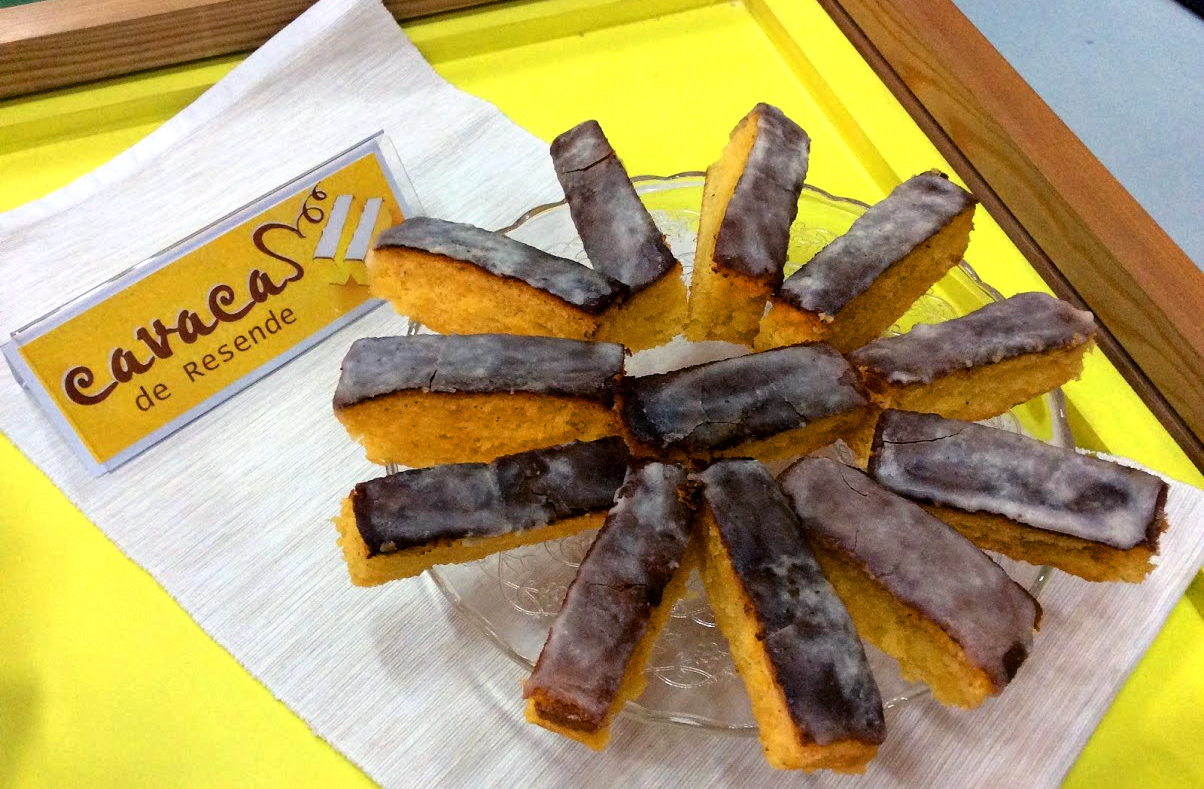
Cavaca

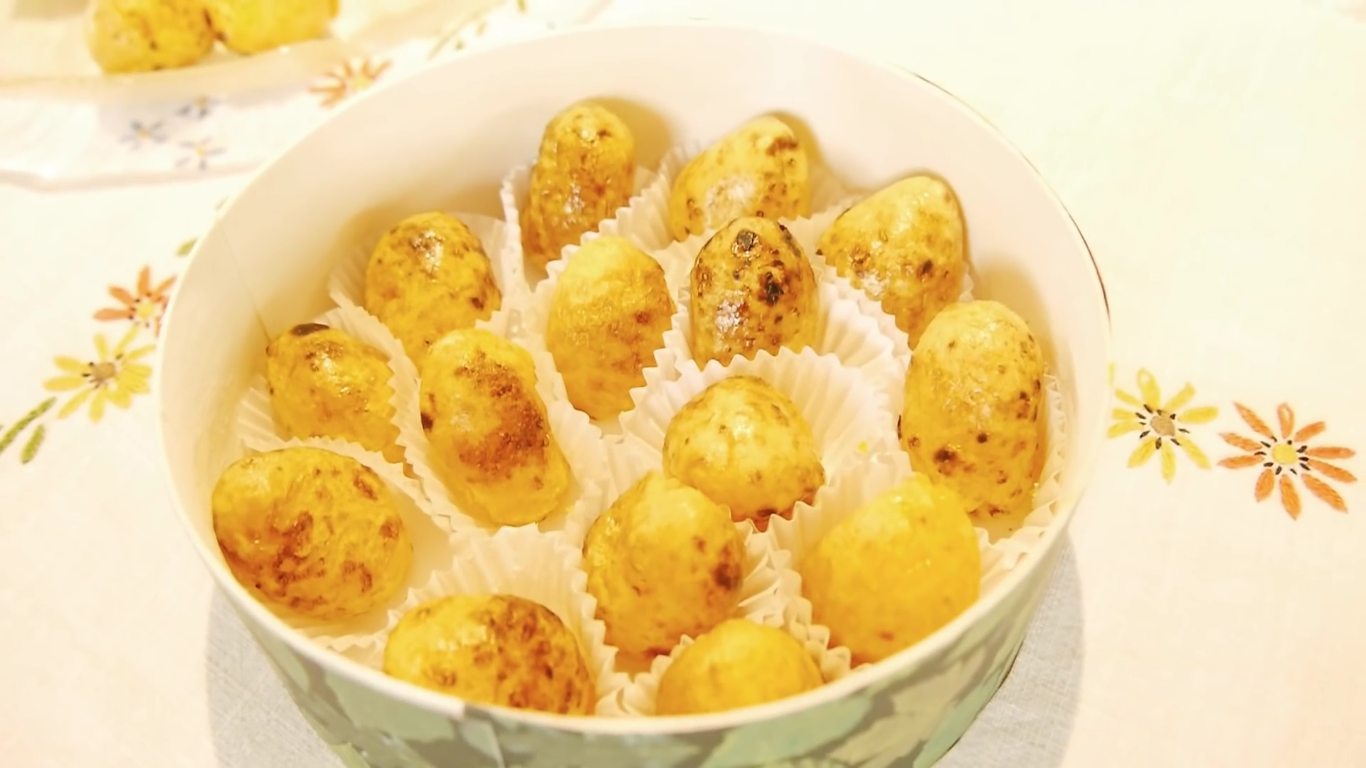
Castanhas de Ovos

- Castanhas de Ovos
- Suspiro
- Cavaca
- Lampreia de ovos
- Pão-de-ló
- Toucinho do Céu
- Filhós
- Rabanadas
- Pastel de nata
- Fios de ovos
- Papo-de-anjo

=== Specific to a province ===
==== Minho ====
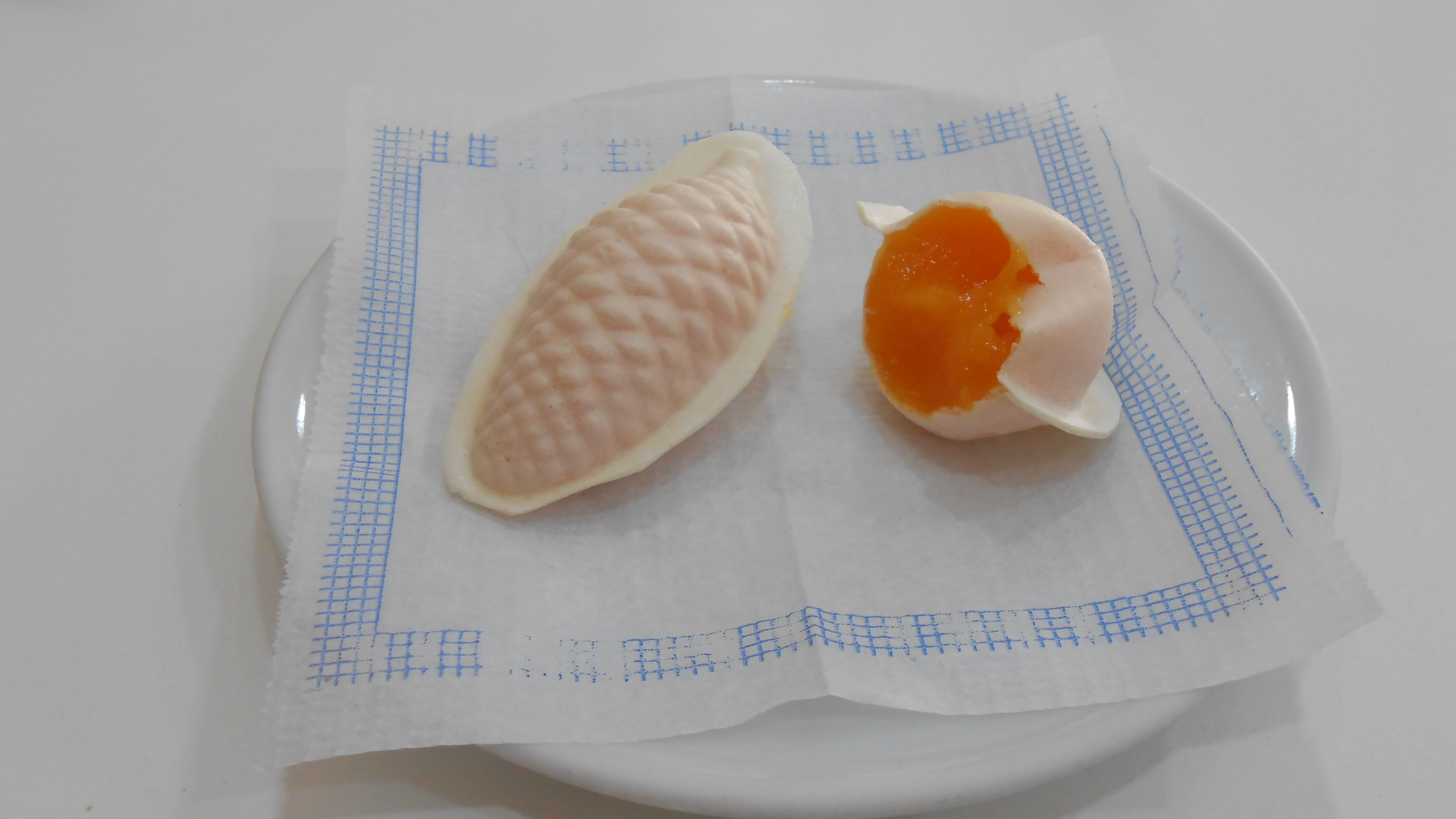
Ovos Moles

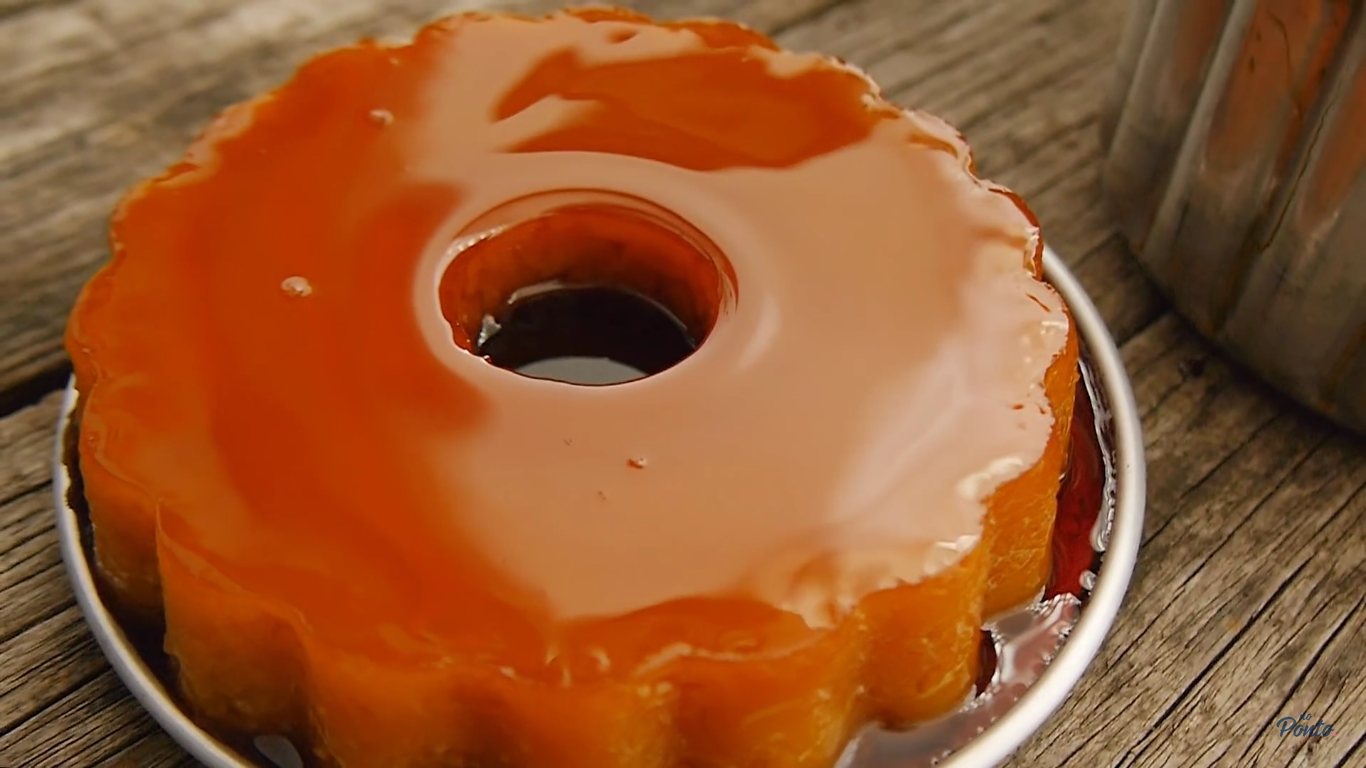
Pudim Abade de Priscos

- Meias Luas
- Papas Doces de Carolo
- Fidalguinhos
- Pudim Abade de Priscos
- Fataunços (Braga)
- Charuto de Ovos
- Pastel de São Francisco
- Bolacha do Bom Jesus
- Morcela Doce de Arouca
- Clarinha de Fão
- Barriga de Freira

==== Douro Litoral ====
- Sapateta
- Perronilha
- Lérias de Amarante
- Tabefe
- Pescoços de freira
- Amarantino
- Pão podre
- Foguetes de Amarante

==== Trás-os-Montes ====
- Morcelas
- Jerimús
- Madalenas do Convento
- Doce de viúvas
- Bolo de nozes de Bragança
- Sestas
- Pitos de Santa Luzia
- Creme da madre Joaquina
- Velharoco
- Queijadas de gila

==== Beira Litoral ====
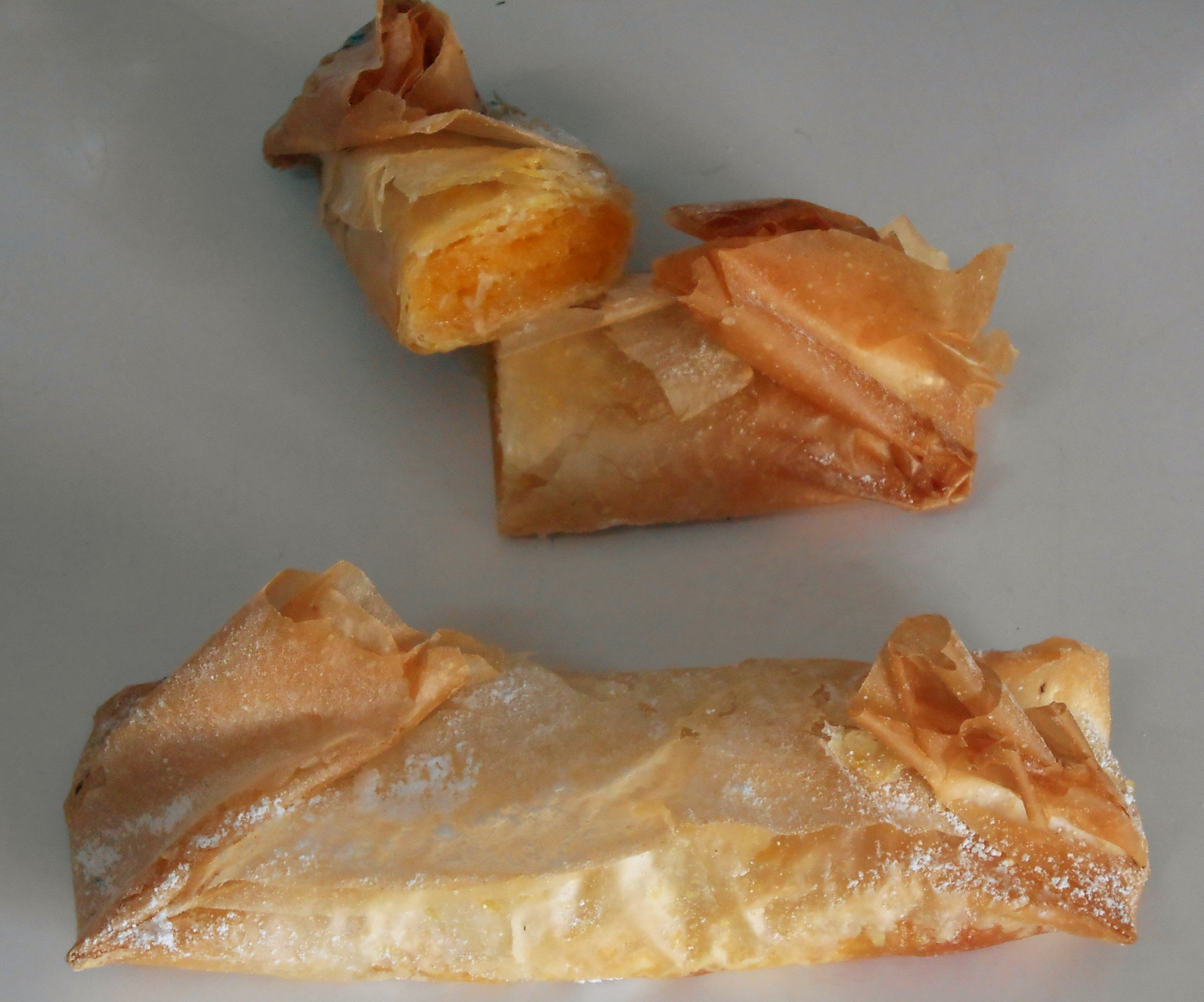
Pastel de Tentúgal

- Brisas do Lis
- Pastel do Lorvão
- Nabada de Semide
- Morcelas de Arouca
- Arrufada
- Nógado de Semide
- Pudim de Ovos das Clarissas (Coimbra)
- Melícias
- Trouxas de ovos moles
- Manjar Branco
- Queijada de Pereira
- Pastel de Tentúgal
- Ovos Moles de Aveiro

==== Beira Alta & Beira Baixa ====
- Lâminas
- Grade
- Bolo de São Vicente
- Argolinhas do Loreto
- Taroucos de Salzedas
- Esquecidos
- Cavacas de Santa Clara
- Bica
- Bolo Paraíso
- Bolo São Francisco
- Sardinhas Doces de Trancoso

==== Ribatejo ====
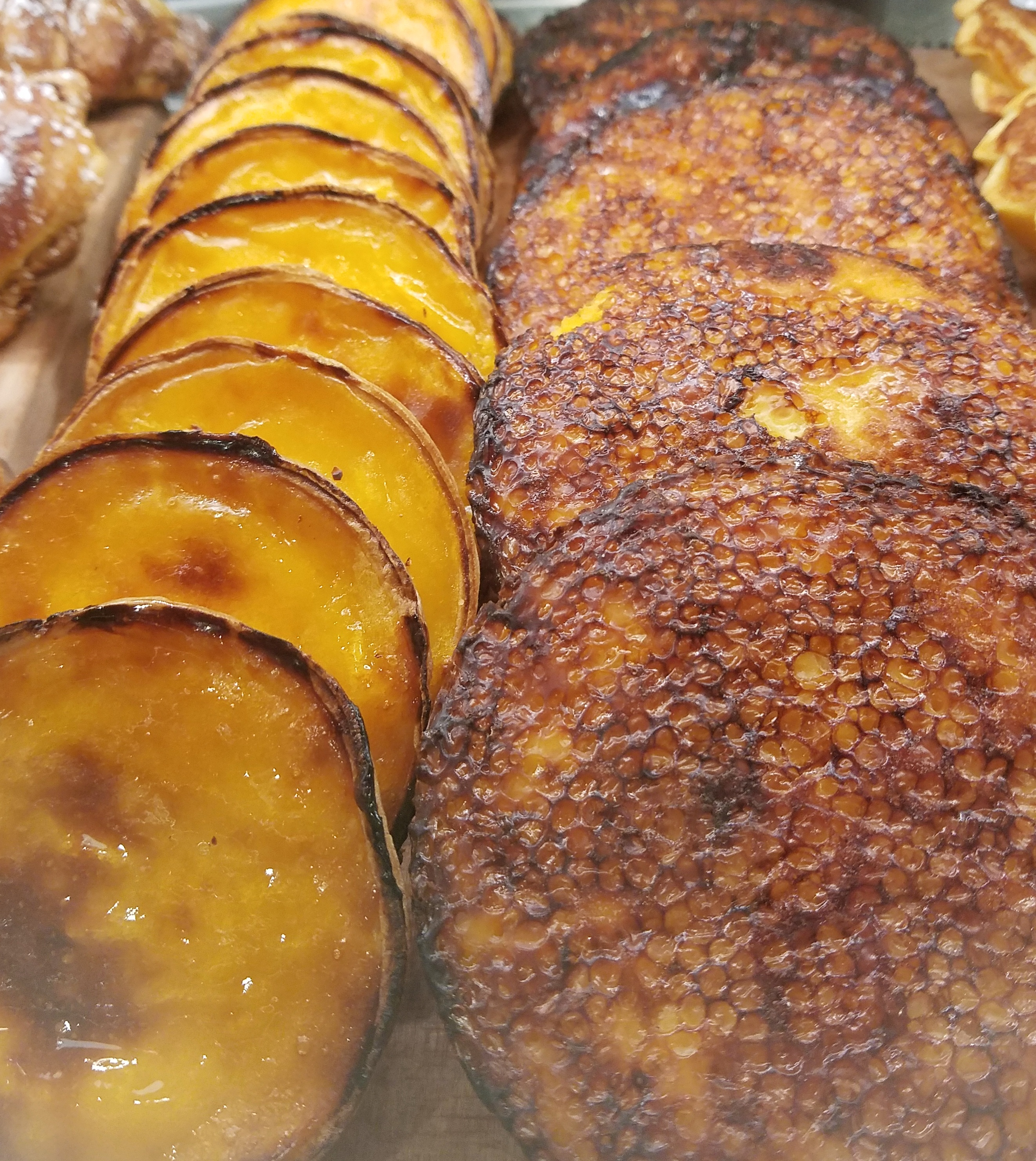
Tigelada (right) next to a Tarte de nata

- Sonhos da Esperança
- Sopapo do Convento
- Palha de Abrantes
- Celeste de Santarém
- Fatias de Tomar
- Tigeladas
- Broas das Donas
- Bica

==== Estremadura ====
- Pastel de Feijão

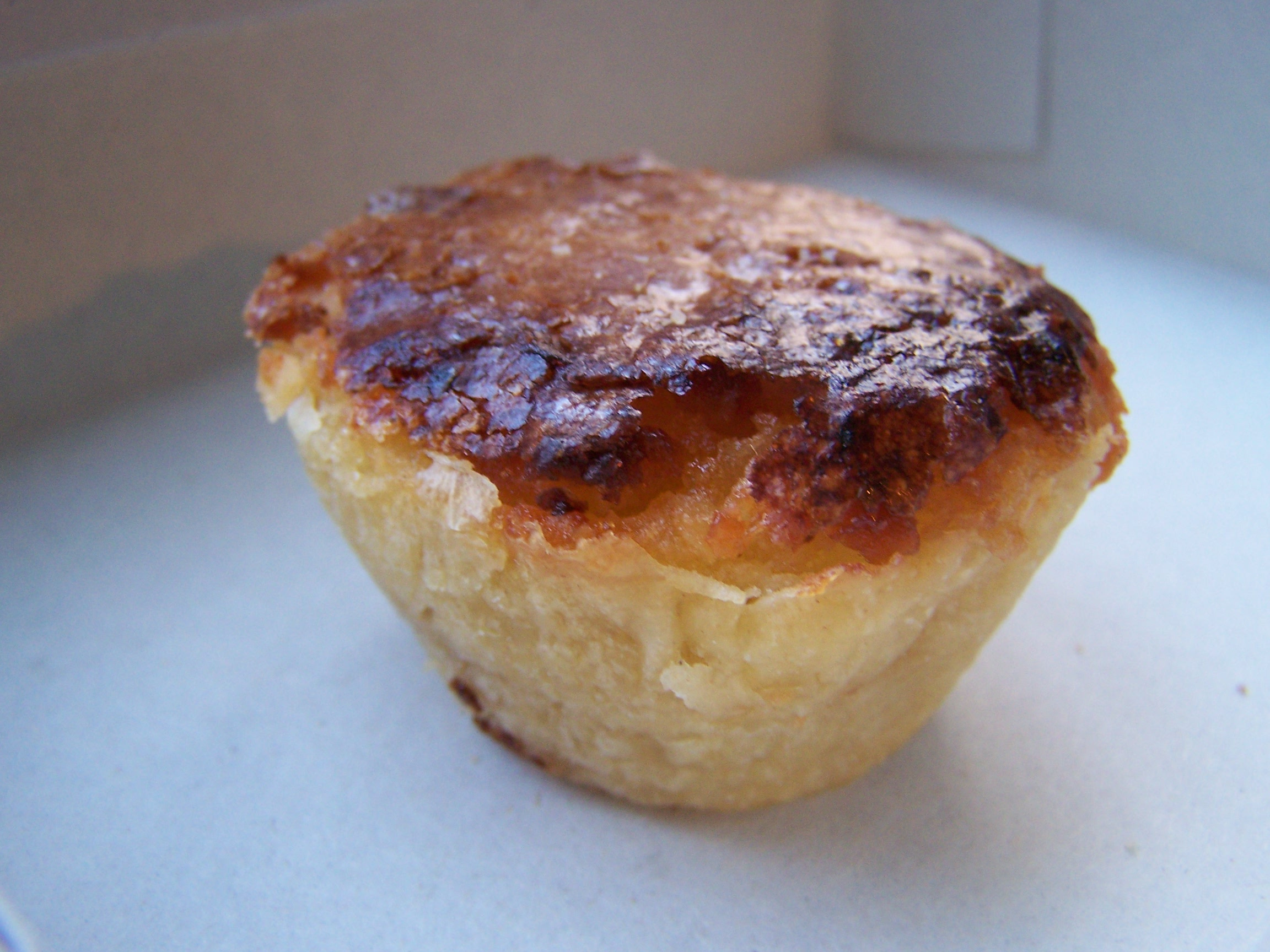
Pastel de feijão (Torres Vedras)

- Bom bocado
- Argolas
- Travesseiros
- Tibornas
- Bolos de Abóbora
- Delícias de Frei João
- Fitas de Páscoa
- Castanhas de Ovos
- Marmelada Branca de Odivelas
- Pão-de-Ló de Alfeizerão
- Nozes de Cascais

==== Alentejo ====
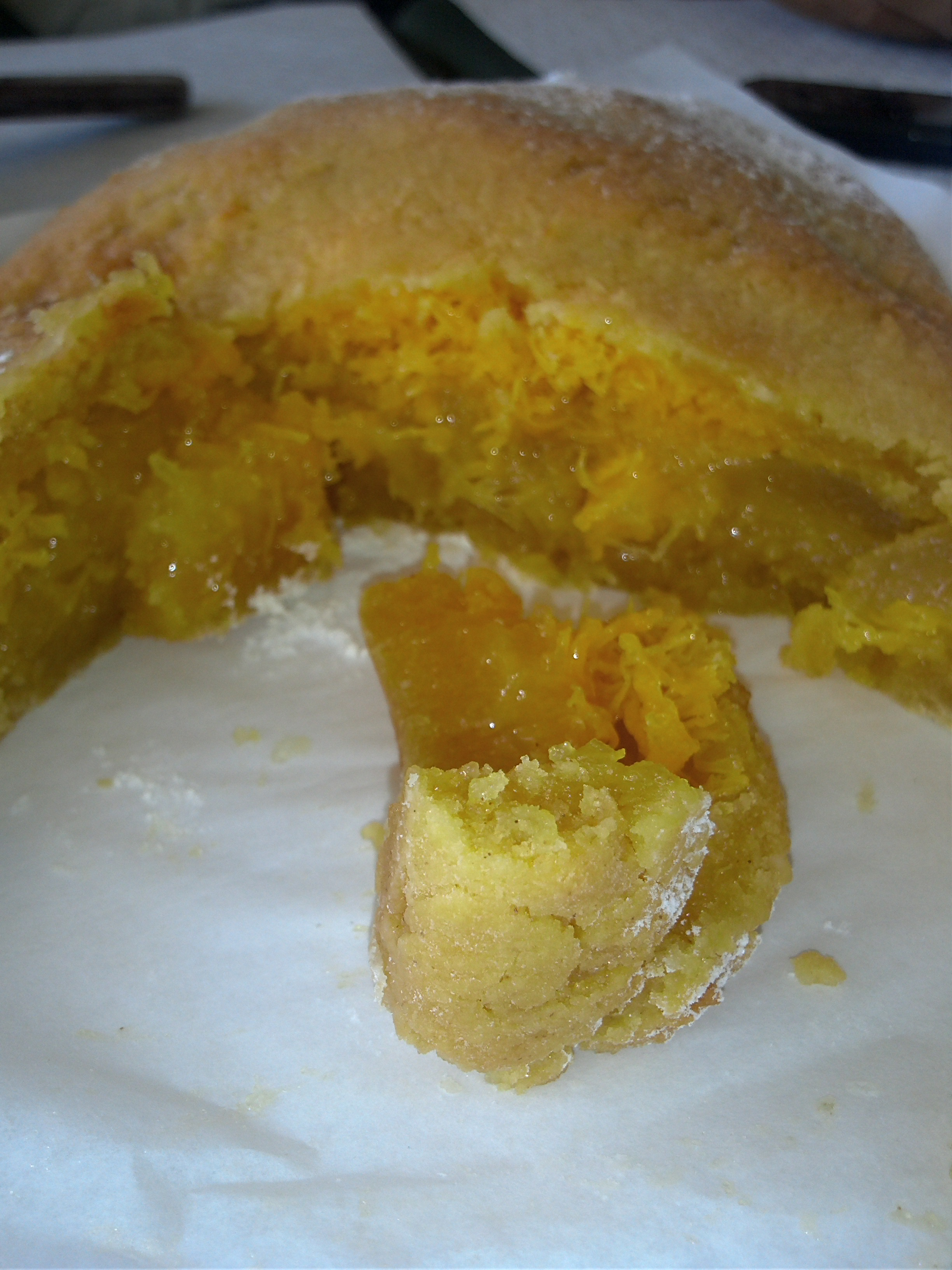
Pão de rala

- Bolo podre
- Fatias reais
- Bolo de chavão
- Coalhada do Convento
- Biscoitos do Cardeal
- Padinhas
- Almendrados
- Orelhas de Abade
- Sopa dourada de Santa Clara
- Bom bocado
- Encharcada
- Sericaia
- Pão de rala
- Formigos
- Tiborna de Ovos
- Torrão Real de Ovos
- Bolo Fidalgo
- Queijo Dourado
- Presunto Doce

==== Algarve ====
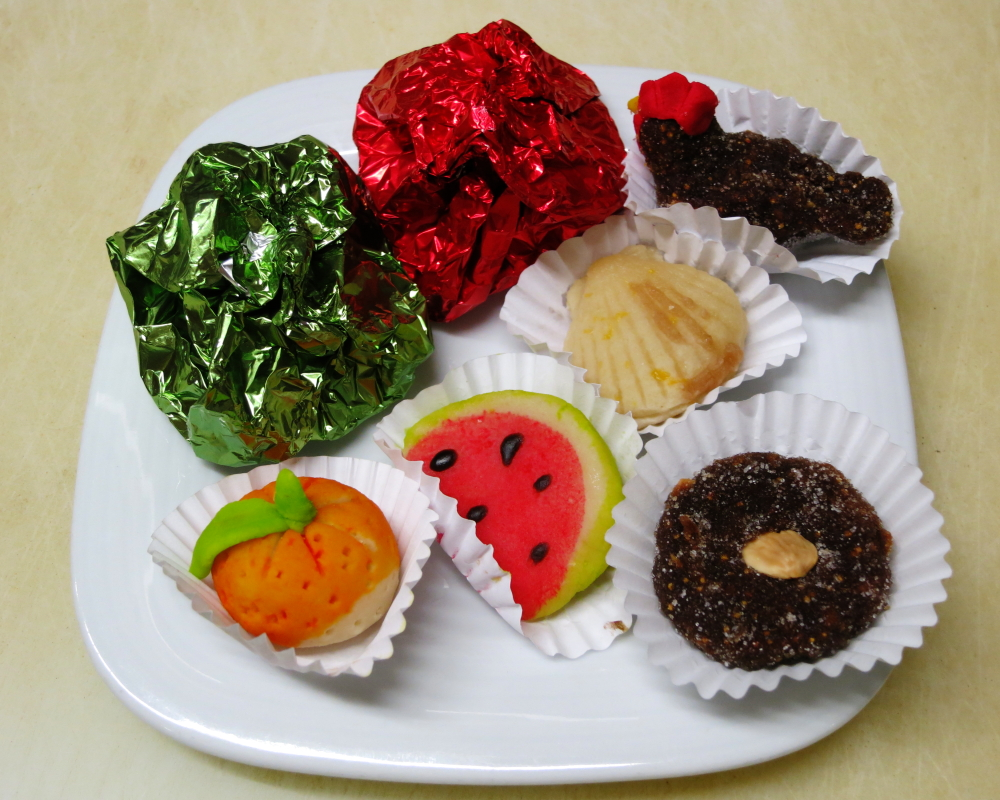
Dom Rodrigo (upper-left corner) and marzipan

- Biscoita
- Bolo de alfarroba
- Bolo de chila e amêndoa
- Bolo de amêndoas e nozes
- Doce fino
- Morgado
- Queijo de figo
- Queijinhos
- Dom Rodrigo
- Massapão
- Pudim da Serra
- Torta de alfarroba
- Torta de amêndoa

==== Madeira ====
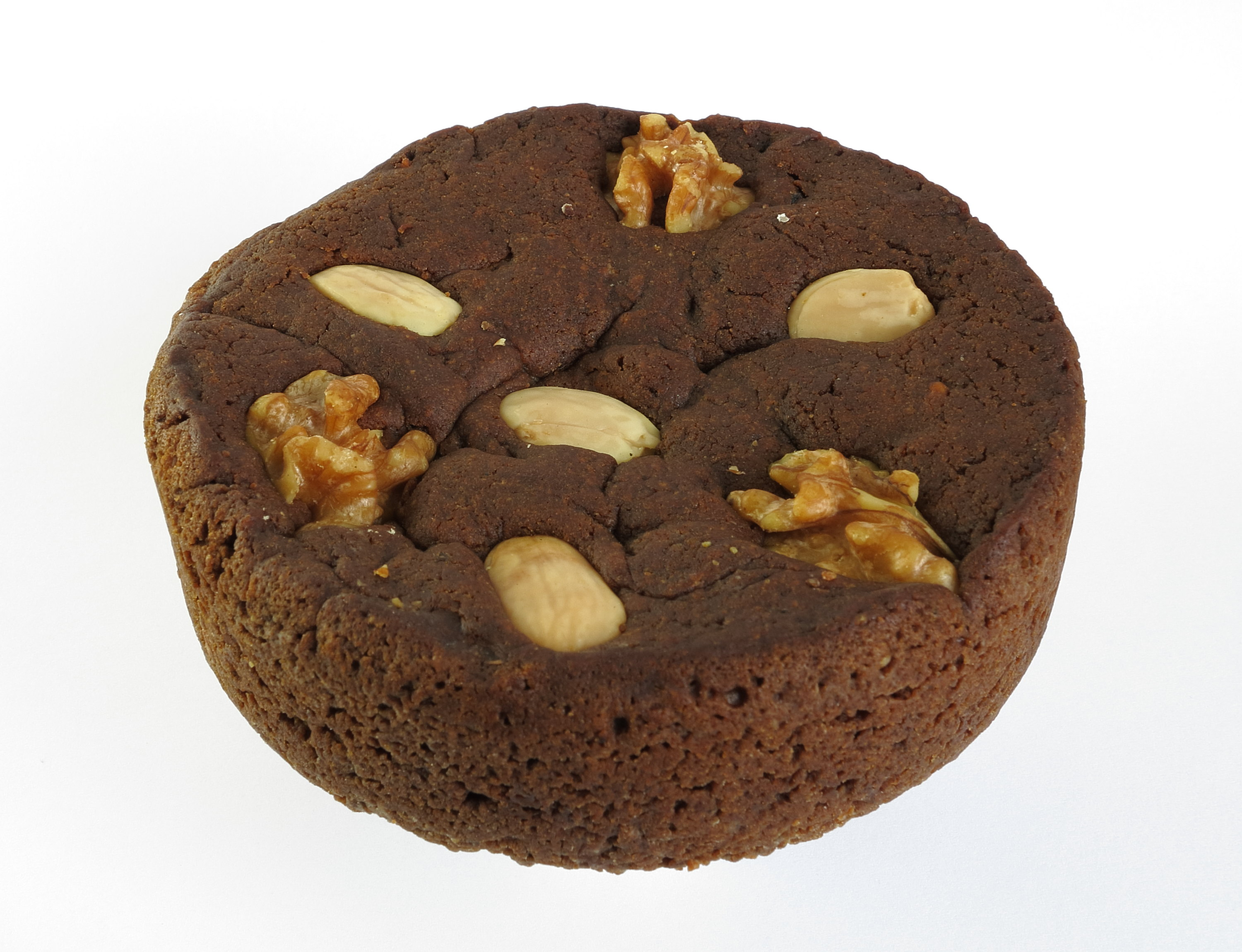
Bolo de mel

- Bolo preto
- Bolo de mel
- Bolinhos de azeite
- Mexericos de freiras
- Frangolho
- Creme de chocolate madeirense

==== Azores ====
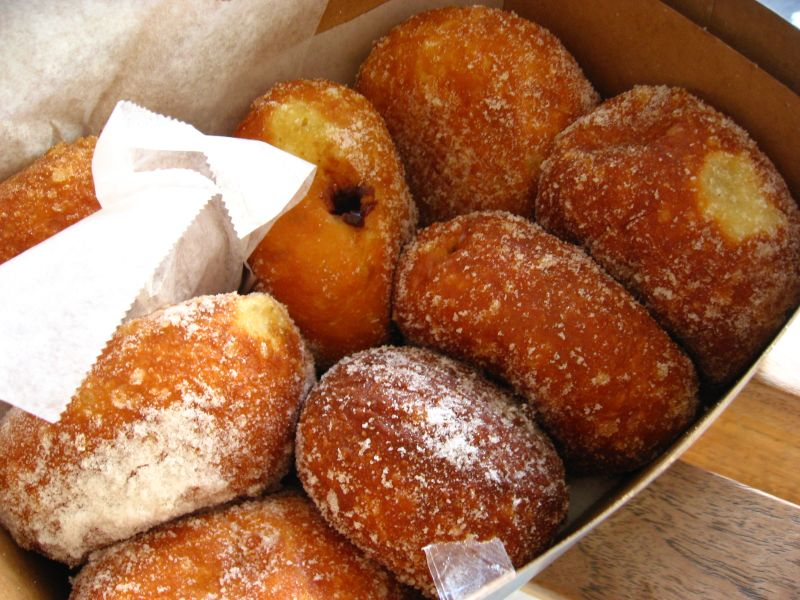
Malassadas

- Bolo micaelense
- Bolo do diabo
- Hóstias de amêndoa
- Malassada
- Rendilhado
- Coquinho
- Cornucópia
- Pudim Irmã Bensaúde
