= Sericaia =

Portuguese milk custard

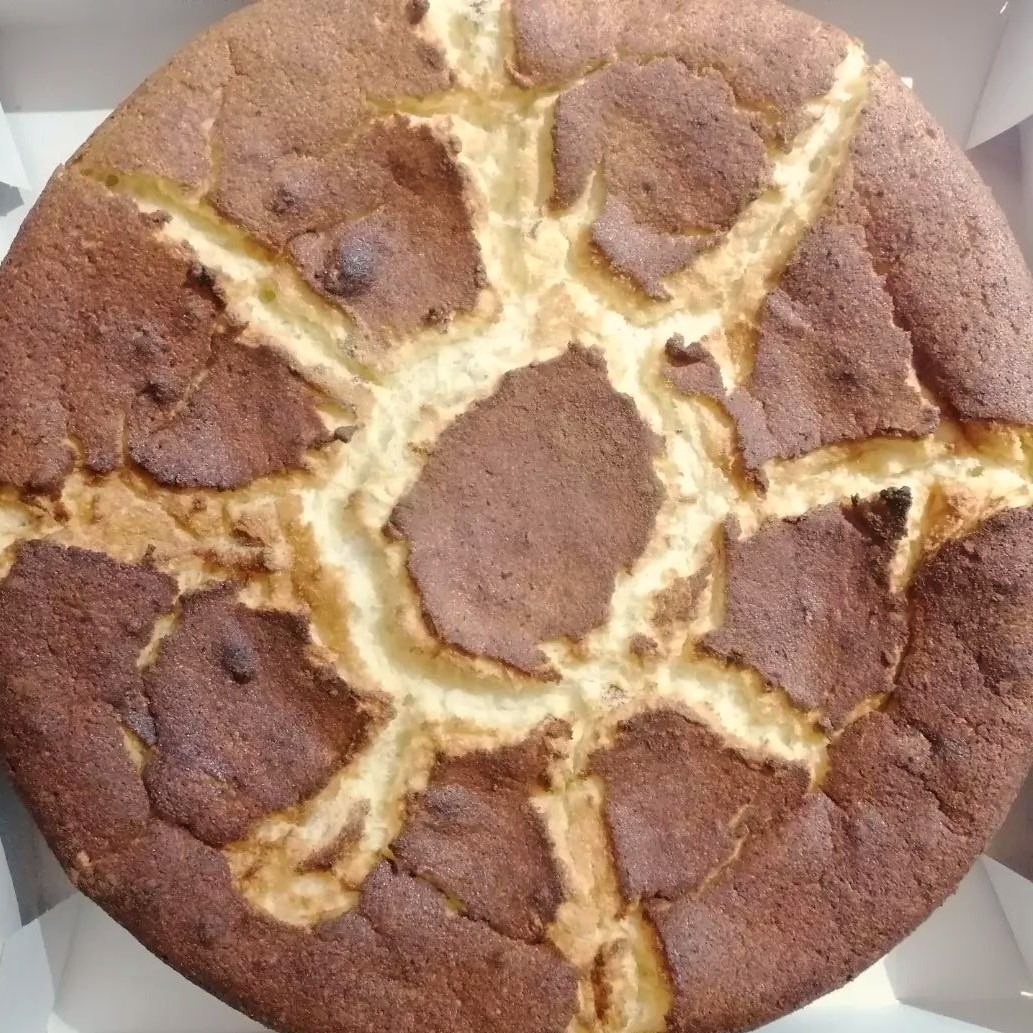
- Sericaia with characteristic cracks
- Alternative names: Siricaia; Sericá; Sericá
- Type: Conventual sweet Pudding; Blancmange; Custard
- Course: Dessert
- Place of origin: Portugal
- Region or state: Elvas, Alentejo
- Main ingredients: Milk, wheat flour, eggs, sugar, cinnamon, lemon zest
- Ingredients generally used: Reine Claude Plums (stewed, as an accompaniment)
- Similar dishes: Manjar branco, Soufflé

Sericaia is a Portuguese pudding similar to a soufflé, from Elvas, Alentejo. It is often accompanied with stewed Reine Claude plums grown in the region.

== History ==
Sericaia is believed to have been influenced by Malay-Indo serikaya (and srikaya), a result of the Portuguese exploration and colonization of Portuguese Malacca in the early 1500s. Serikaya, in manuscripts written in the 1600s define it as a coconut custard. (Note: In contemporary Malaysian cuisine, it is a confection or jam made of coconut milk, eggs, sugar and flavored with pandan leaves.) (Note: Srikaya is also the Malaysian definition for Annona squamosa, or "custard apple", a fruit tree from the Americas introduced to Southeast Asia by the Spaniards or Portuguese.)

Constantino de Bragança, governor of Goa, Portuguese India is said to have brought the seri kaya recipe back to Portugal in the 1500s where it was re-interpreted by the nuns in the convents and monasteries of Alentejo. Specifically in Elvas, at the convents of Nossa Senhora da Conceição and Santa Clara. Cinnamon, another key ingredient in sericaia, was also brought back from Asia in 16th century.

Another interpretation suggests that it was the other way around―the Portuguese sericaia influenced the creation of seri kaya, dairy milk was substituted with widely available coconut milk and bread replaced pastry.

== Preparation ==
Milk is first boiled with pieces of lemon skin and a cinnamon stick. Traditionally, flour is added to the milk similar to blancmange. In contemporary recipes, it is added to the egg yolks that is previously beaten with sugar.

The warm milk is then slowly incorporated into the egg yolk mixture and reheated until slightly thickened. The egg whites are separately beaten until stiff and folded into the custard.

The batter is spooned into earthenware dishes and generously dusted with ground cinnamon to bake. Cracks that appear on the crust is characteristic of the dish.

It is common to serve the dessert with stewed plums and syrup, honey, or other fruit preserve.

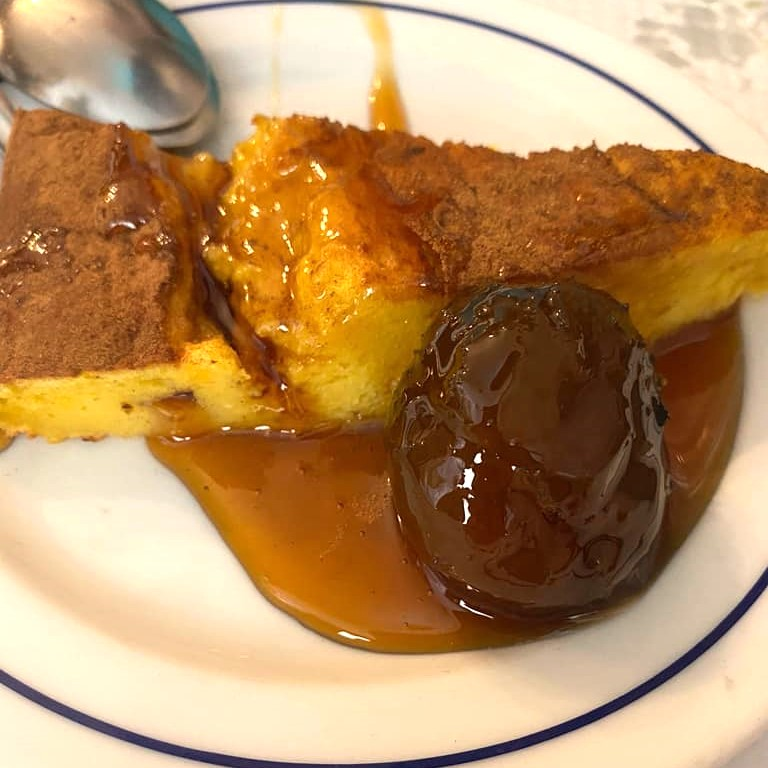
Sericaia served with plum and syrup

== See also ==
- Portuguese Cuisine
