= Toucinho do Céu =

Portuguese almond dessert

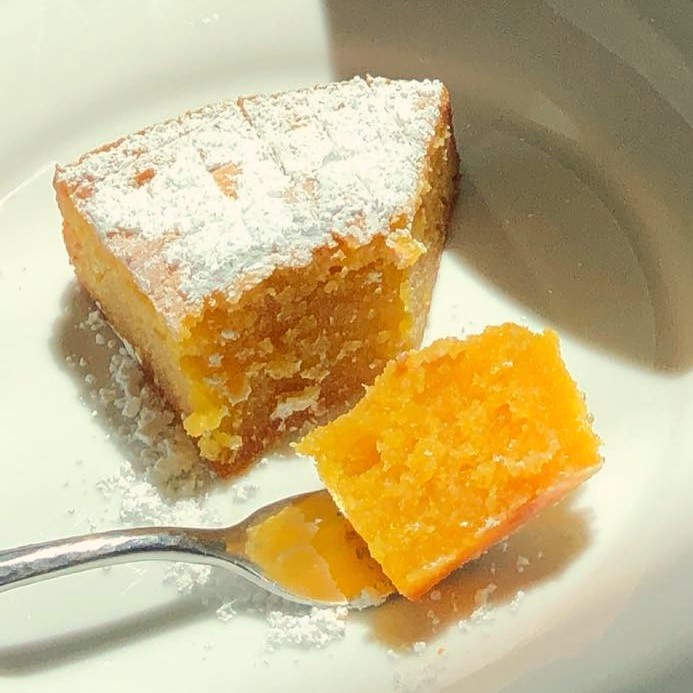
- Toucinho do céu
- Alternative names: • Toucinho-do-Céu • Toucinho-do-Céu da Madre Abadessa
- Type: Pudding; Conventual sweet
- Course: Dessert
- Place of origin: Portugal
- Region or state: Alentejo
- Created by: Convent of Saint Mónica
- Main ingredients: Almonds, eggs, sugar, butter (lard)
- Ingredients generally used: Cinnamon, cloves
- Variations: • Toucinho-do-Céu de Murça • Toucinho Rançoso • Pastéis de Toucinho do Convento da Esperança
- Similar dishes: Frangipane, tocino de cielo, pão de ló

Toucinho do Céu (lit. 'bacon from heaven') is a Portuguese dessert made primarily of almonds, eggs, and sugar. While it is often described as a cake or tart, toucinho do céu remains largely free of flour and should not be mistaken for other Portuguese cakes and tarts containing almonds.

== History ==
Like other desserts characteristic of Portuguese cuisine known as conventual sweets (Portuguese: Doçaria Conventual), it contains high amounts of eggs, almonds and little wheat flour. (Note: Almonds became a major crop during the Moorish Occupation between the 6th and 7th century.) (Note: Eggs, particularly the use of egg yolks, was a byproduct during the late Middle Ages. In monastic tradition, egg whites were used as a form of clothing starch and also as fining in the clarification process of making wine.) (Note: Lastly, sugar was a highly prized ingredient also introduced by the Moors in the Arab-spice trade. Sugarcane, native to Southeast Asia, became an important crop industry starting in Madeira around the mid 1400s, then largely in Brazil beginning in the early 1500s.)

Toucinho do céu is named after its appearance, which closely resembles bacon. (Note: Tocino de cielo, a conventual sweet from Spain shares the same translation and aptly named after its resemblance to bacon, however it is made with eggs, sugar, and water.) However, it also historically incorporated ground bacon or bacon lard into its recipe, and is an option in contemporary recipes. The nuns of the Convento de Santa Mónica are credited with creating this pudding in the 1500s.

== Preparation ==
Sugar is dissolved in water and brought to a boil. The ground almonds are added to the syrup until thickened, similar to marzipan. This mixture is slightly cooled before adding butter (historically lard). Egg yolks are then slowly incorporated to the almond paste. Spices, such as cinnamon or cloves, are added along with orange zest or amaretto. This batter is then poured into a greased and floured pan and baked until slightly firm. The finished cake is dusted with powdered sugar.

== Variations ==
- Toucinho-do-Céu de Murça (lit. 'heaven's bacon from Murça') ― This variation from Murça contains doce de gila. The doce de gila is added the same time the ground almond is added to the sugar syrup. The recipe is credited to Benedictine nuns from the convent in the area.
- Toucinho Rançoso (lit. 'rancid bacon') ― From Alentejo, this pudding also contains doce de gila. However, prior to baking, it is topped with additional flour to prevent additional browning to the top. The excess flour is then brushed away after it is baked. The story is said that a nun was caught in the act of committing gluttony by her confessor. When asked what she was eating, she replied, "rancid bacon."
- Pastéis de Toucinho do Convento da Esperança (lit. 'bacon pastries from the Convent of Hope') ― These pastries from Alentejo contain actual bacon are made into small tarts. While the recipe is credited to the Convent of Hope, it is attributed to the Convent of St. John the Penitent or the Maltesinhas de Estremoz. The pastry crust is similar to puff pastry. Bacon jam is added when the sugar syrup is being made, followed by the ground almonds, eggs, and cinnamon. This paste fills the pastry-lined tart pans to bake.
- Toucinho do Céu de Guimarães (lit. 'heaven's bacon from Guimarães') ― This variation from Guimarães is similar to the traditional variety but includes doce de gila in the almond mixture. Additionally, whereas the traditional variety is served in a tart form and sliced, Toucinho do Céu de Guimarães are shaped into a flattened ball like form, and then rolled in caster sugar before serving whole.

== See also ==
- Portuguese Cuisine
- Tocino de cielo, a Spanish conventual sweet which shares the same meaning, is made largely of eggs yolks and sugar
