= Dom Rodrigo =

Portuguese dessert

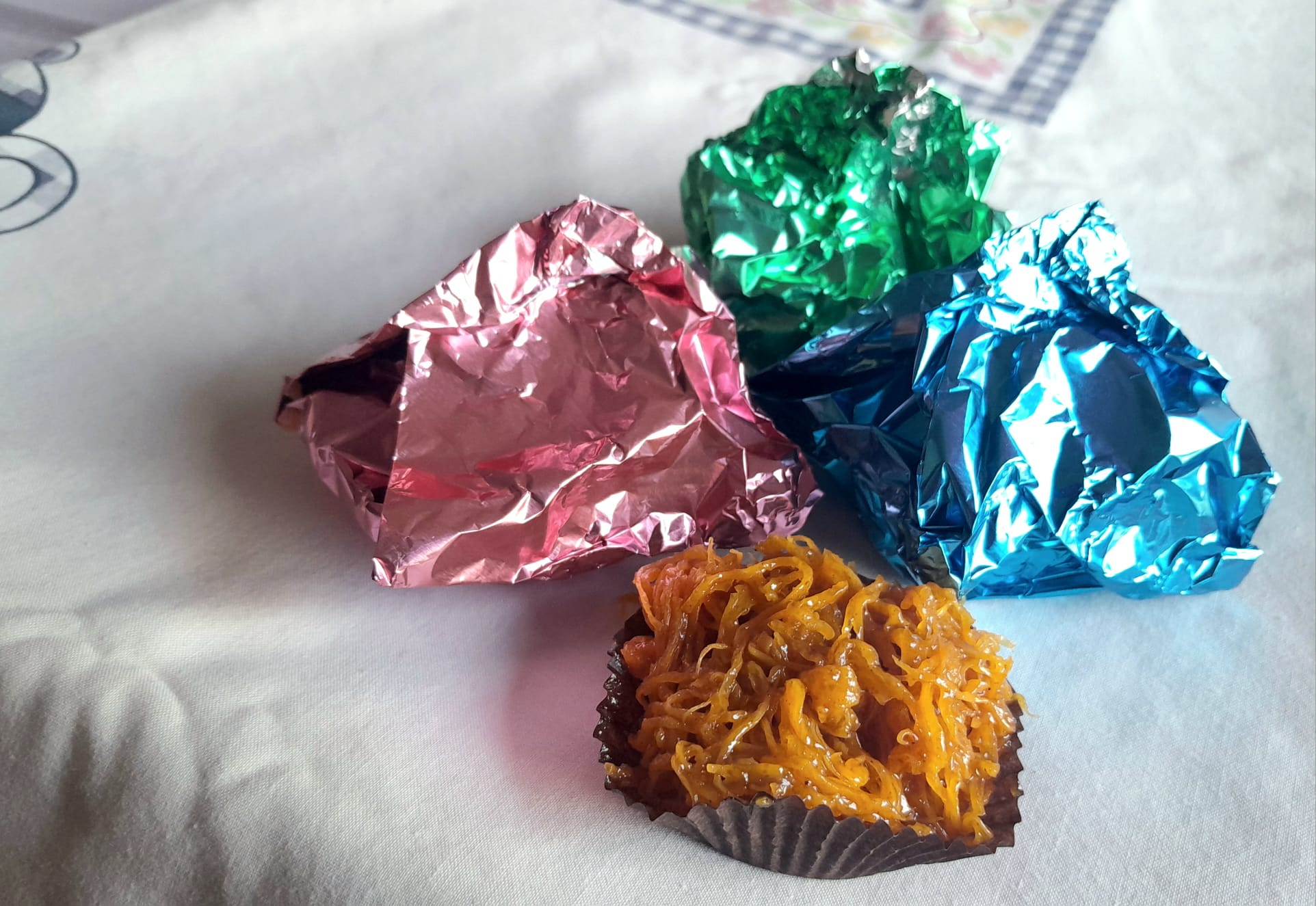

Dom Rodrigo is a traditional dessert from the city of Lagos, in the Algarve region of Portugal.

== Description ==
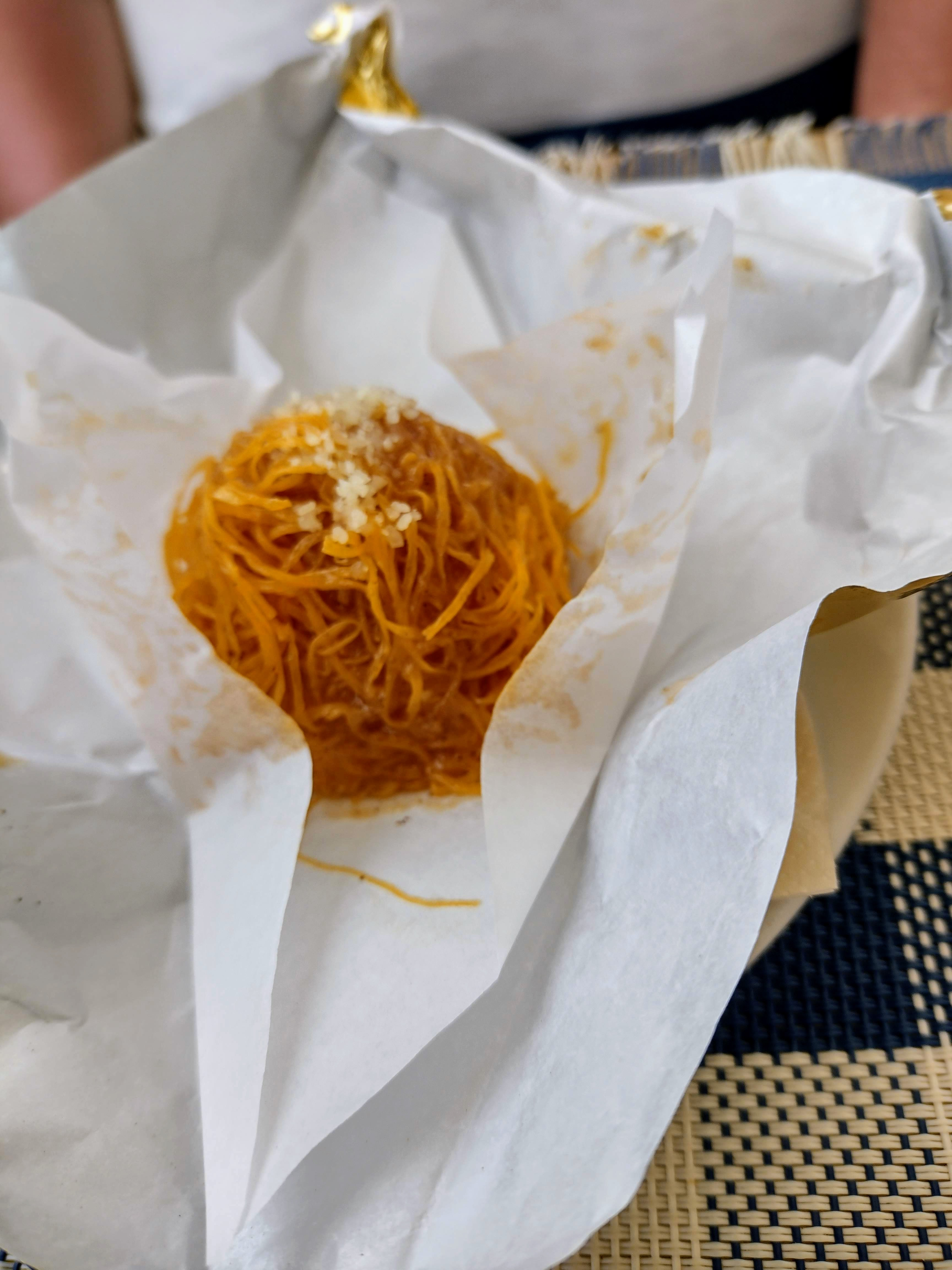

The base is a mixture of eggs and sugar, while other ingredients are also used, such as almond kernels. Eggs are used in two ways, either as strings or yolks.

Dom Rodrigo sweets have been served in three ways: in the form of sweets, in porcelain or glass bowls, which are then eaten with a spoon, and wrapped in metallic paper, in silver or coloured tones.

== History ==
The Dom Rodrigo sweet probably originated in the Convent of Nossa Senhora do Carmo, and popular tradition has it that it was produced to please the governor and captain general of the Algarve, D. Rodrigo de Menezes, from whom the sweet took its name.
