= Fatias de Tomar =

Portuguese dessert

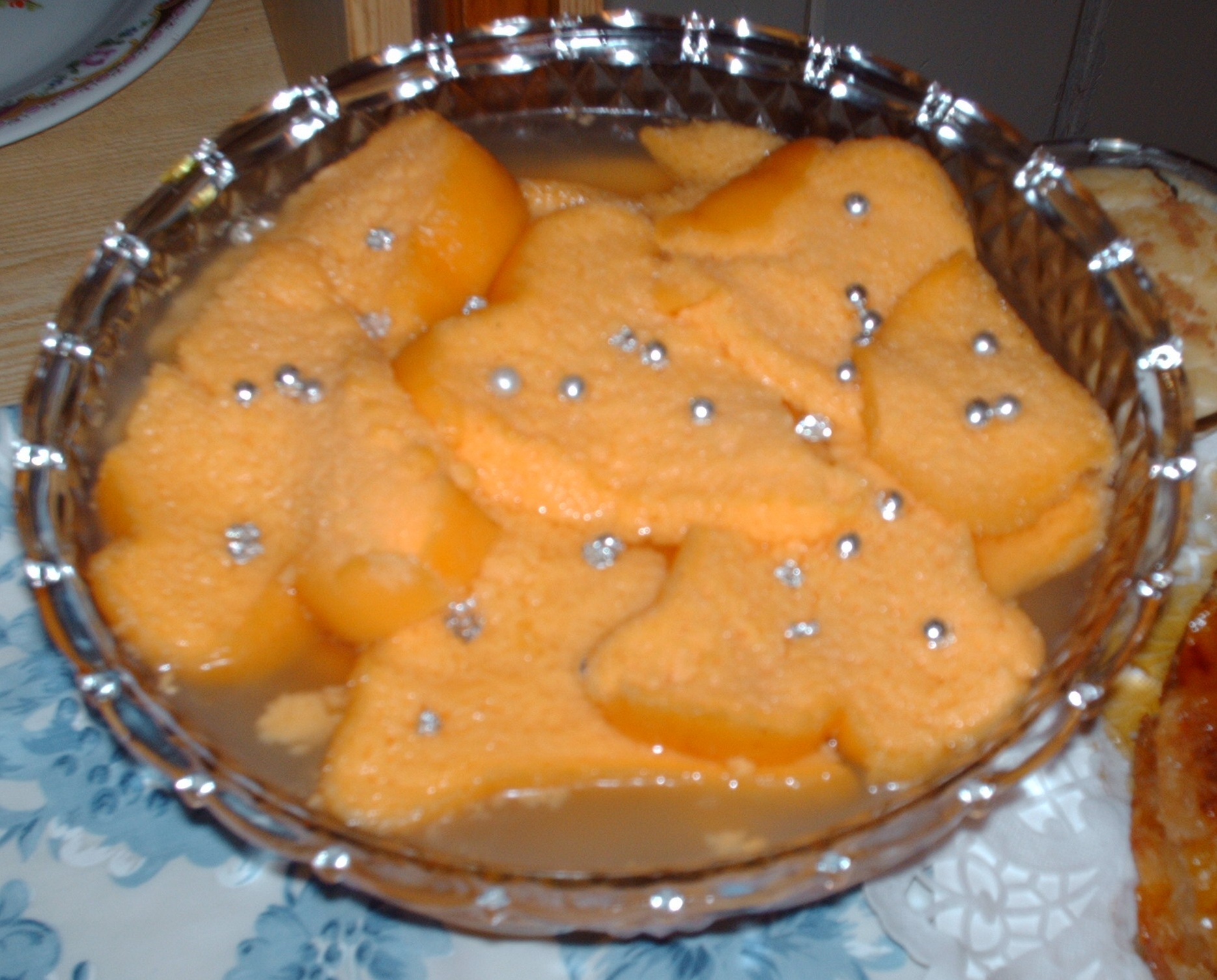
Fatias de Tomar soaked in a sugar calda

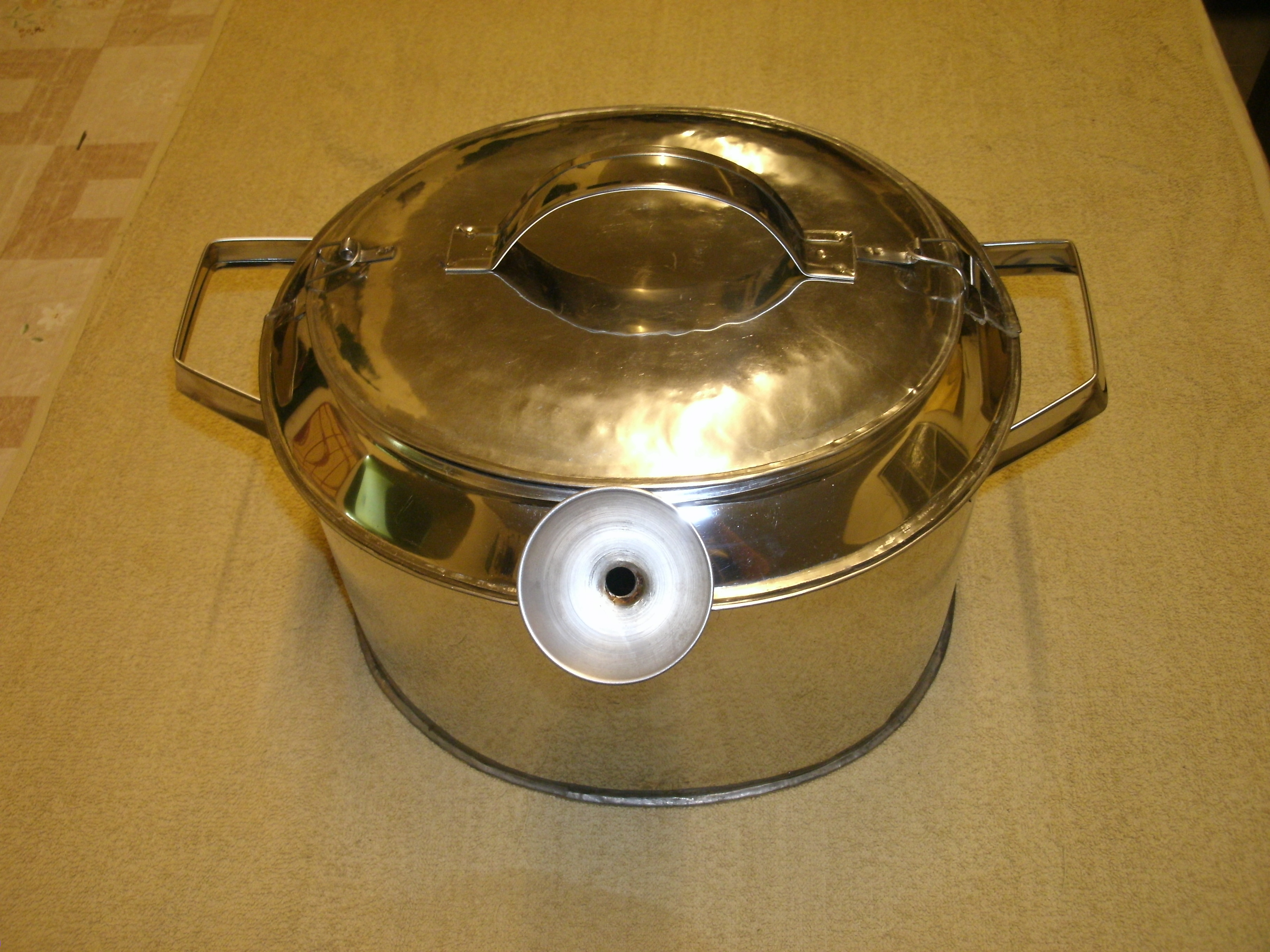
Modern pan used to make the sweet dessert

Fatias de Tomar ("Slices of Tomar") is a Portuguese dessert from Tomar. They were originally made by nuns in the Convent of Christ.
