= Encharcada =

Portuguese egg dessert

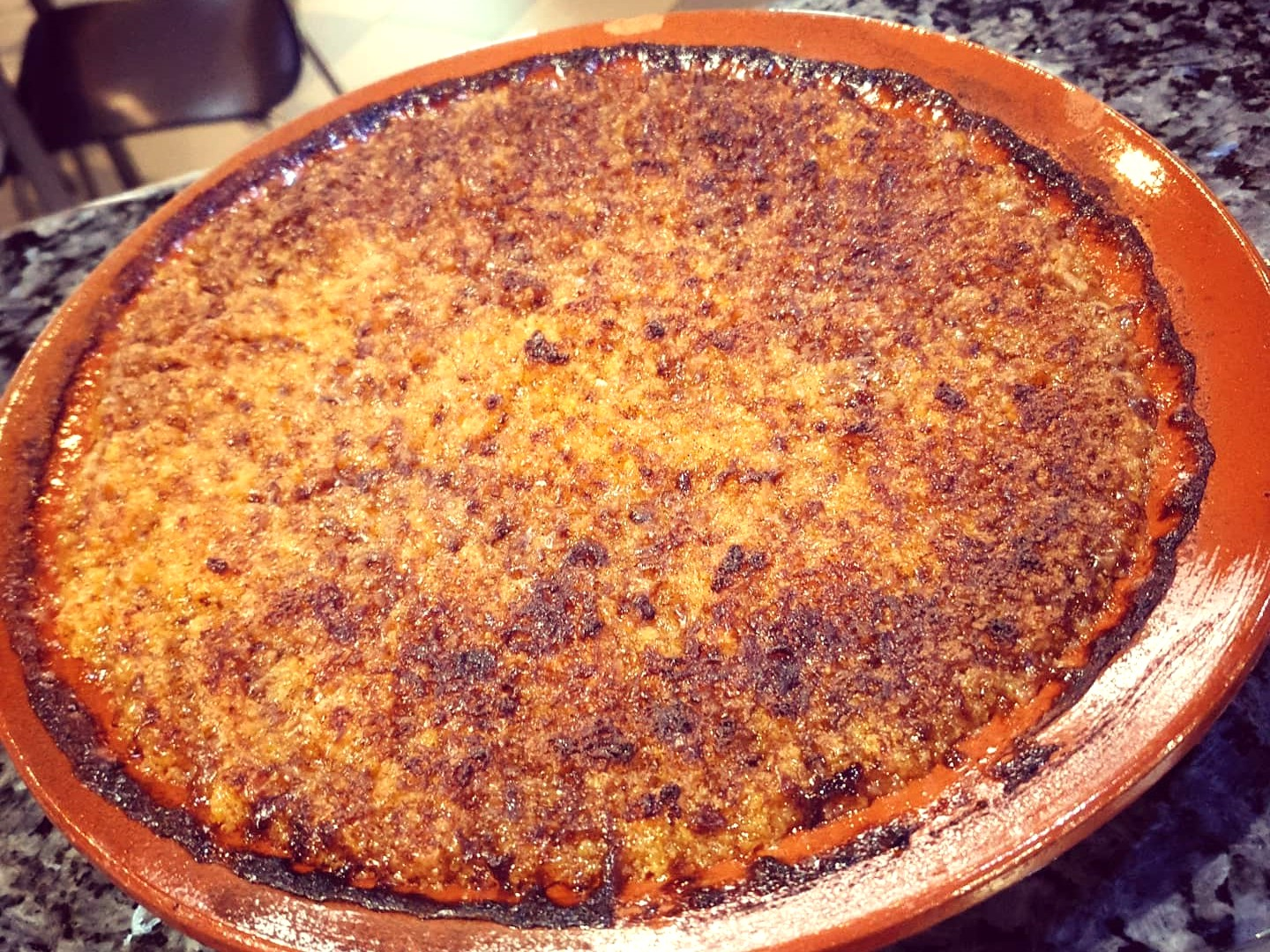
- Alternative names: Encharcada de ovos; encharcada de fios de ovos; encharcada alentejana; encharcada de Évora; encharcada conventual
- Type: Conventual sweet Pudding
- Course: Sobremesa
- Place of origin: Portugal
- Region or state: Évora, Alentejo
- Main ingredients: Egg yolks, sugar, water
- Ingredients generally used: Cinnamon, lemon zest
- Similar dishes: Fios de ovos, Doces de ovos

Encharcada is a traditional Portuguese conventual sweet of egg yolks boiled in sugar syrup and then broiled.

== History ==
Like many other conventual sweets that developed in the 15th century, encharcada contains a substantial amount of egg yolks and sugar. It is believed that the dish was created in the Convento de Santa Clara in Évora, Alentejo. The dish is named after the method in which the eggs are cooked, encharcado, lit. 'to soak'―drenched, in hot sugar syrup.

Doces de ovos and fios de ovos are similar conventual sweets made with the similar ingredients. Doces de ovos is cooked at a lower temperature in order to prevent curdling of the eggs. Fios de ovos is drizzled into fine threads and drained before using it in other desserts.

== Preparation ==
To prepare encharcada, nine egg yolks are separated from its whites. Two whole eggs are whisked with the egg yolks and then strained through a sieve. A cup of water is boiled. To it, two cups of sugar are added with lemon peel. When the sugar syrup reaches 225°F (107°C), the lemon peel is removed, and the egg yolk mixture is slowly drizzled into the syrup. The curds are cooked for about 15 minutes, then drained into a dish, and sprinkled with ground cinnamon. Optionally, the top is caramelized with a blowtorch or by broiling.

== See also ==
- Doces de ovos
- Fios de ovos
- Portuguese Cuisine
